= List of enslaved people of Mount Vernon =

Slaves on Mount Vernon estate

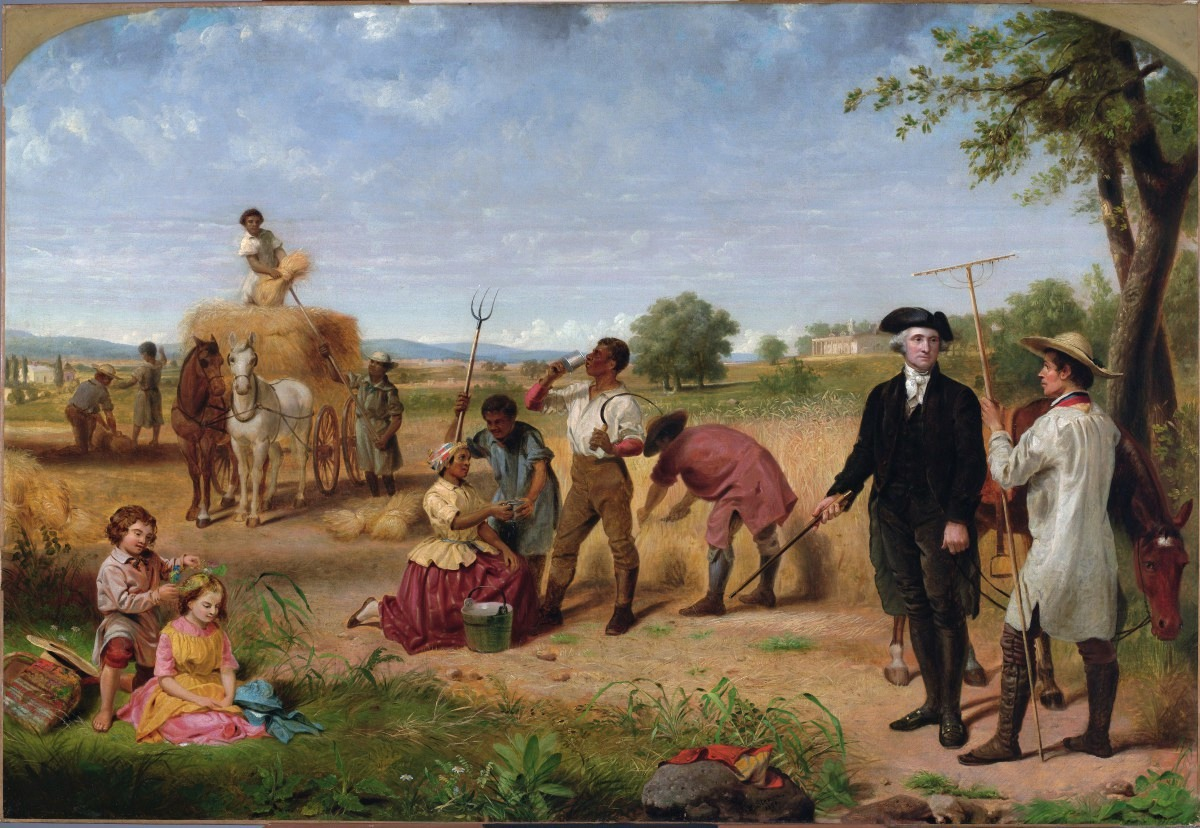
Washington out on Mount Vernon plantation, by Junius Brutus Stearns (1851). This painting shows an idealized version of plantation work, far removed from the reality of the harsh conditions endured by the slaves

There were several notable enslaved people of Mount Vernon, established by George Washington in Fairfax County, Virginia prior to the American Revolutionary War. There is a diverse history of the African Americans from Mount Vernon. William Costin successfully challenged District of Columbia slave codes. Ona Judge and Hercules Posey were chefs at the President's House, with Posey the head chef. William Lee, who was frequently by George Washington's side, was one of the most publicized enslaved people in Colonial America. Sarah Johnson lived as an enslaved and a free person on Mount Vernon, and lived there for over 50 years and became a farm owner and a member of the Mount Vernon Ladies' Association.

Christopher Sheels was a long-time house servant of Washington's who made escape plans in 1799 that were unsuccessful. He was one of four enslaved people present at Washington's deathbed. Harry Washington was born in Gambia and sold into slavery as a war captive and was purchased by George Washington. During the American Revolutionary War, Harry Washington escaped from slavery in Virginia and served as a corporal in the Black Pioneers attached to a British artillery unit. After the war he was among Black Loyalists resettled by the British in Nova Scotia, where they were granted land. There Washington married Jenny, another freed American slave. In 1792 he joined nearly 1,200 freedmen for resettlement in Sierra Leone, where they set up a colony of free people of color. Deborah Squash was a slave on George Washington's Mount Vernon plantation before she escaped in 1781. She was one of the 3,000 blacks in the Book of Negroes that sailed on a British ship for Nova Scotia.

== List ==
- Betty (c. 1738–1795) was an enslaved woman owned by Martha Washington. She was the mother of Ona Judge.
- Caroline Branham (1764–1843) was born to an enslaved woman of Daniel Parke Custis, Martha Washington's first husband. When Martha married George Washington, she came to live at Mount Vernon where Caroline was born. Branham had nine children, eight of whom were the offspring of her husband Peter Hardiman, a groomsman. Another child, Lucy, is considered the daughter of George Washington Parke Custis, Martha's grandson and Branham's slaveholder after Martha's death. Besides her household duties, she was responsible for making clothing for Washington's enslaved people. She was able to negotiate the freedom of her grandson, Lucy's son, in exchange for being interviewed by Jared Sparks. Robert H. Robinson was freed in 1846 at the age of 21.

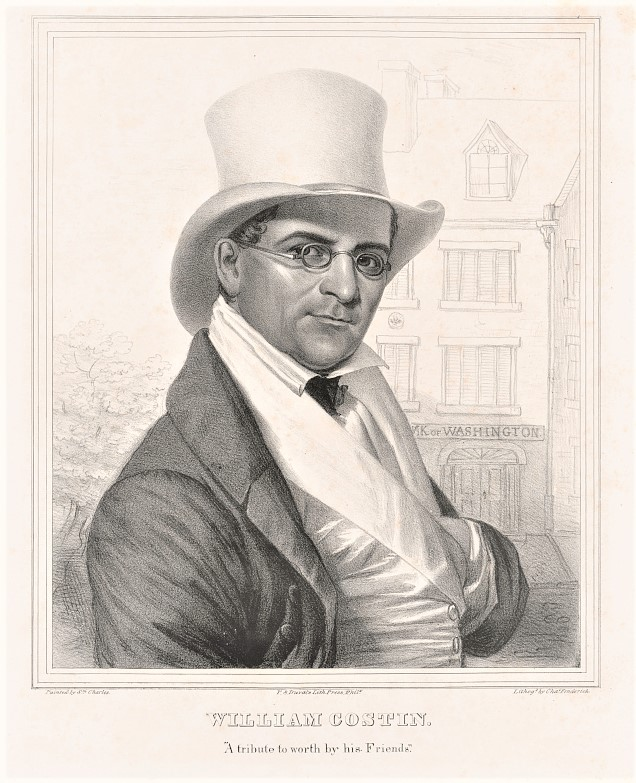
William Costin in 1842

- William Costin (c. 1780 - May 31, 1842) born to an enslaved woman of Mount Vernon, was an African-American activist and scholar who successfully challenged District of Columbia slave codes in the Circuit Court of the District of Columbia.
- West Ford (c. 1784 – 1863) was a mulatto man who was a caretaker of the estate. He arrived at Mount Vernon in 1802, was enslaved until 1805 when he was freed, and continued working there as a free man until 1860. He created an oral history of his life at Mount Vernon.
- Sarah Johnson (September 29, 1844–January 25, 1920) was an African American woman who was born into slavery at Mount Vernon, George Washington's estate in Fairfax, Virginia. She worked as a domestic, cleaning and caring for the residence. During the process, she became an informal historian of all of mansion's furnishings. After the end of the Civil War, she was hired by the Mount Vernon Ladies' Association, ultimately becoming a council member of the organization. She and her husband, Nathan, saved their money and bought four acres of Mount Vernon land to establish a small farm. The book Sarah Johnson's Mount Vernon (2008) tells her story of her life as well as the complex community of people that inhabited Mount Vernon.

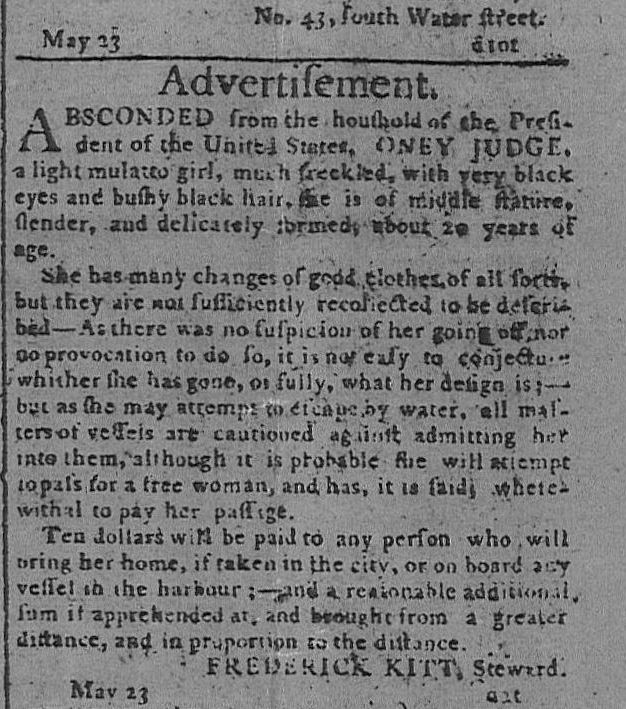
Ona Judge runaway ad

- Ona Judge (c. 1773 – February 25, 1848), also known as Ona Judge Staines, was a mulatto woman enslaved to the Washington family, first at the family's plantation at Mount Vernon and later, after George Washington became president, at the President's House in Philadelphia, then the nation's capital city. At the age of 23, she absconded, becoming a fugitive slave, after learning that Martha Washington had intended to transfer ownership of her to her niece, known to have a horrible temper, and fled to New Hampshire, where she married, had children, and converted to Christianity. Though she was never freed, the Washington family did not want to risk public backlash in forcing her to return to Virginia and after so many years of failing to persuade her to return quietly, the family let her be.
- Philip Lee (c. 1785 – ?), also known as Phill and Uncle Phil, was an enslaved American of mixed race who served as valet and body servant to George Washington Parke Custis for at least 32 years.
- William Lee (approximately 1750–1810), also known as Billy or Will Lee, was enslaved by George Washington and served as his personal assistant. He was the only one of Washington's slaves who was freed immediately by Washington's will. Because he served by Washington's side throughout the American Revolutionary War and was sometimes depicted next to Washington in paintings, Lee was one of the most publicized African-Americans of his time. His brother Frank was also purchased by Washington, and he was freed in 1801 according to his will.
- Hercules Posey (1748 – May 15, 1812) was an African American enslaved by the Washington family, serving as the family's head chef for many years, first at Mount Vernon in Virginia and later, after George Washington was elected president of the newly formed United States of America, in the country's then-capital city of Philadelphia in Pennsylvania at the President's House, working alongside Ona Judge. Sometime in 1797, Posey absconded and fled to New York, where he lived until his death in 1812. He was legally manumitted upon Washington's death in 1799, though his children remained enslaved by Washington's wife, Martha Washington.

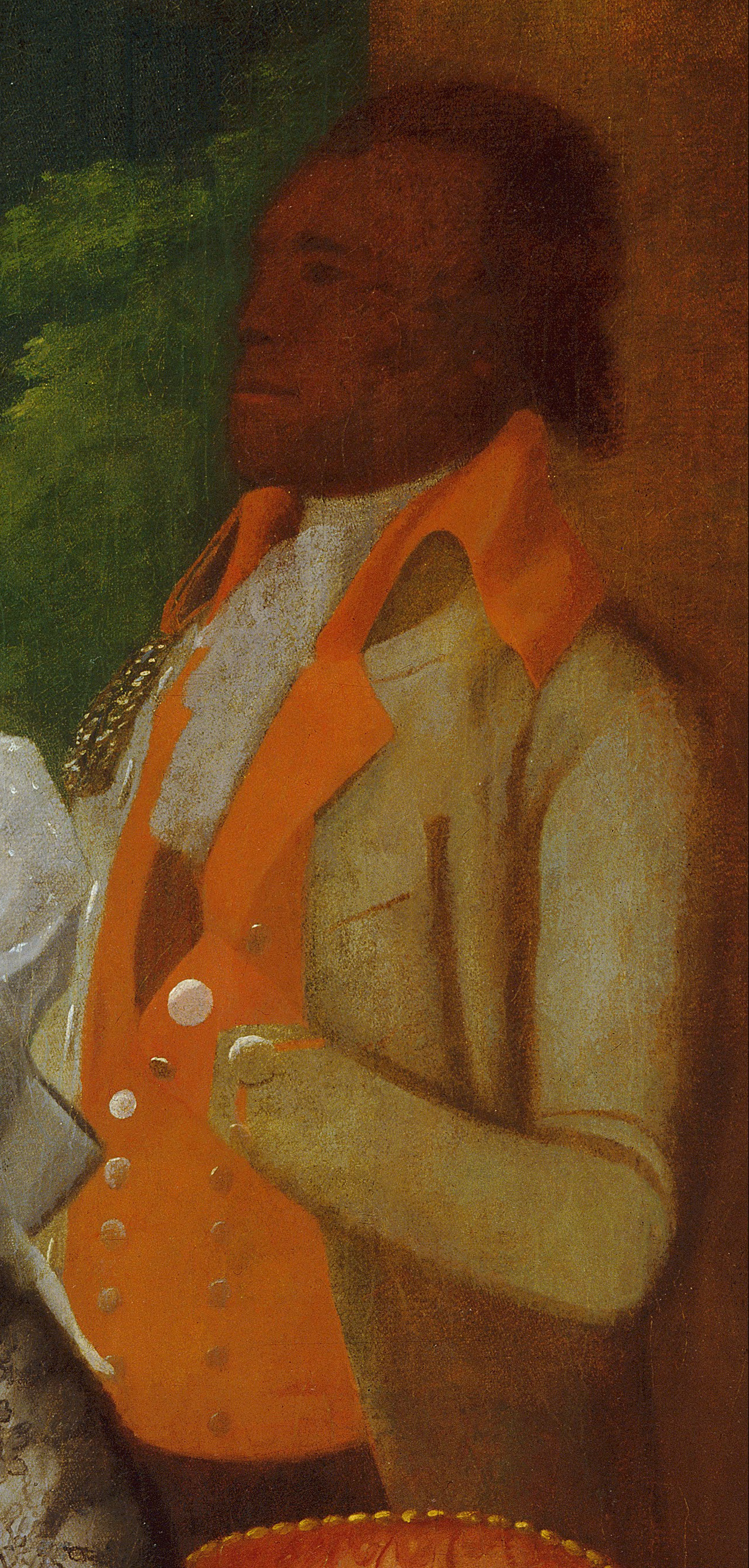
Detail from The Washington Family by Edward Savage (1789–96). The person pictured here is probably Christopher Sheels. (Note: "Research now suggests that the figure standing just outside the family group is Christopher Sheels, an enslaved attendant to the president. Unlike the four family members, Sheels is painted in shadow.")

- Christopher Sheels (born c. 1774, Mount Vernon, Virginia – year and place of death unknown), was an enslaved house servant at George Washington's plantation, Mount Vernon. As a teenager, he worked as Washington's "body servant" in the presidential households in New York City, 1789–90, and Philadelphia, 1790–91. In September 1799, Washington foiled an escape attempt by Sheels from Mount Vernon. Three months later he was present at the former-president's deathbed.
- Deborah Squash (born ca. 1763–1765) was a slave on George Washington's Mount Vernon plantation before she escaped in 1781. She went to New Amsterdam, which was the headquarters for the British during the American Revolution. At the end of the war, she was one of the 3,000 blacks in the Book of Negroes that sailed on a British ship for Nova Scotia.
- Harry Washington (c. 1740–1800) was born in Gambia and sold into slavery as a war captive, then purchased by George Washington. During the American Revolutionary War, Harry Washington escaped from slavery in Virginia and served as a corporal in the Black Pioneers attached to a British artillery unit. After the war he was among Black Loyalists resettled by the British in Nova Scotia, where they were granted land. There Washington married Jenny, another freed American slave. In 1792 he joined nearly 1200 freedmen for resettlement in Sierra Leone, where they set up a colony of free people of color.

== Gallery ==
Media related to Slavery at Mount Vernon at Wikimedia Commons

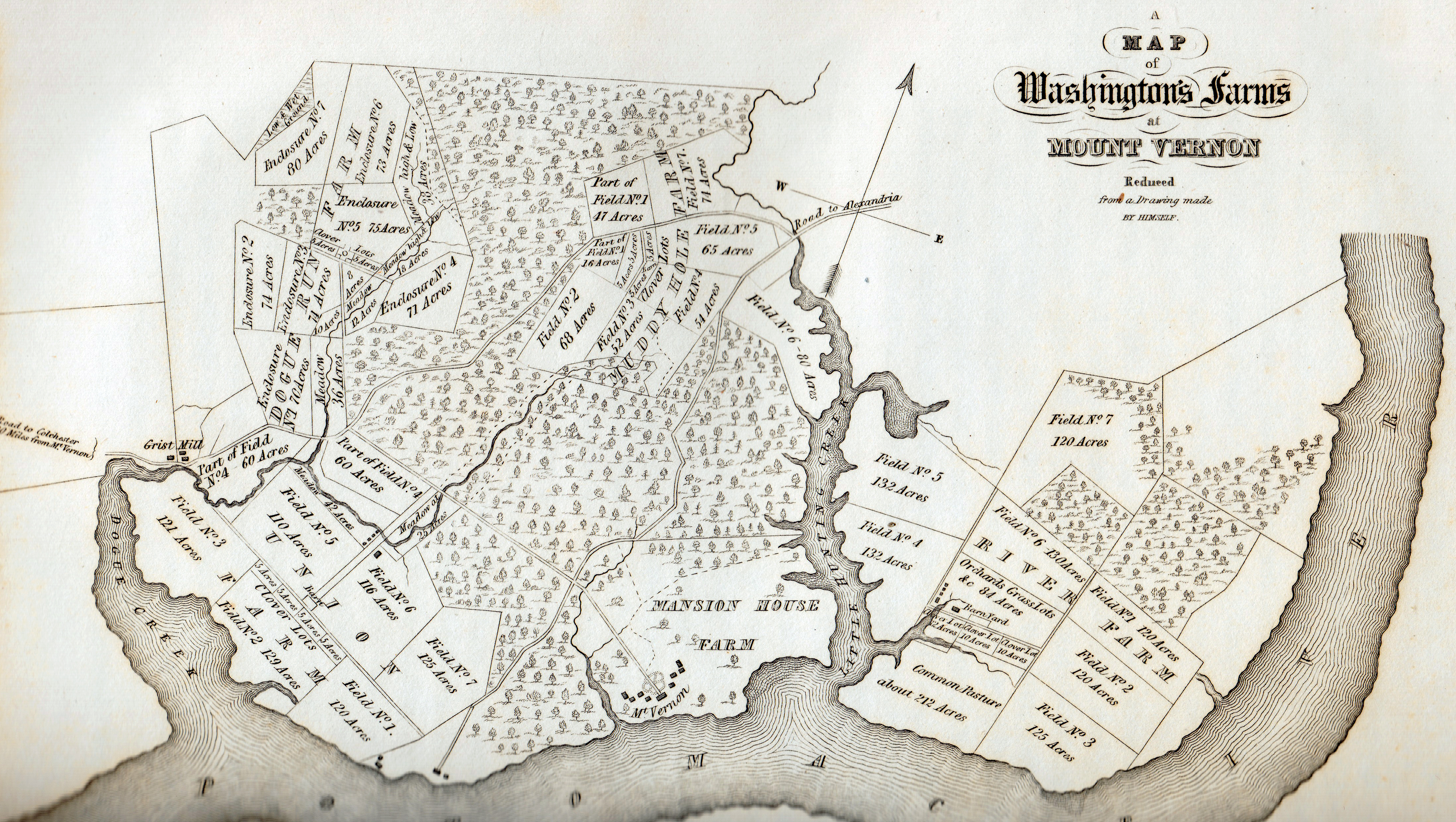
1830 engraving of a map of Mount Vernon, General Washington's estate and mansion. Based on a map drawn by Washington. Library of Congress Geography and Map Division Washington, D.C.

== See also ==
- George Washington and slavery
- Mount Vernon § Agriculture and enterprise
- United Empire Loyalist
- List of slaves
