= President's House (Philadelphia) =

U.S. presidential mansion in Pennsylvania

President's House in Philadelphia
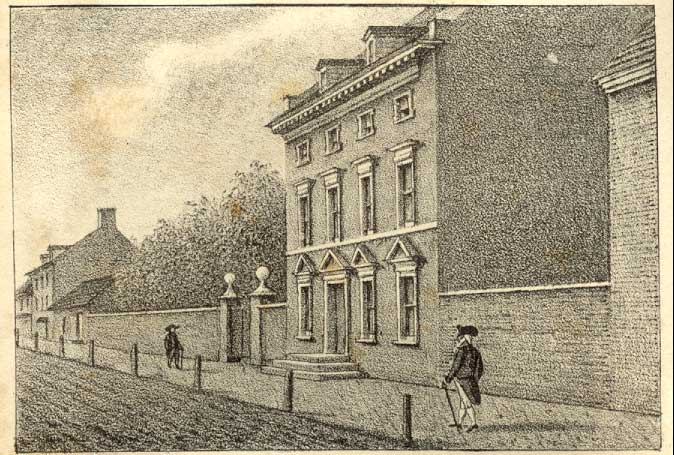
- An 1830 lithograph of the President's House in Philadelphia. This served as the U.S. Executive Mansion for President George Washington from November 1790 to March 1797, and for President John Adams from March 1797 to May 1800.
- Former names: 190 High Street; Masters-Penn House; Robert Morris Mansion

General information
- Architectural style: Georgian
- Location: 524–30 Market Street, Philadelphia, Pennsylvania, United States
- Coordinates: 39.9505°N 75.1501°W
- Construction started: 1767; 259 years ago
- Demolished: 1832/1951
- Client: Mary Lawrence Masters

President's House in Philadelphia was the third U.S. presidential mansion, following the first two in New York City. (Note: New York City served as the first national capital under the U.S. Constitution. From April 1789 to February 1790, President George Washington occupied a house on Cherry Street. His presidential household moved to larger a house on Broadway in February 1790, but that was only occupied until the end of August 1790.) President George Washington occupied the Philadelphia house from November 27, 1790 to March 10, 1797; and President John Adams occupied it from March 21, 1797 to May 30, 1800. In November, 1800, Adams became the first president to occupy the unfinished White House, in Washington, D.C.

The Philadelphia house was located on the south side of what is now Market Street, one block north of Independence Hall (then known as the Pennsylvania State House). It had been built by widow Mary Masters around 1767, and became a wedding present to her daughter Mary and Acting-Governor of Pennsylvania Richard Penn, when they married in 1772.

During the 1777–1778 British occupation of Philadelphia, the house was the headquarters of General Sir William Howe. Following the June 1778 British evacuation of the city, American General Benedict Arnold made the house his headquarters. Robert Morris, a Founding Father and a financier of the Revolutionary War, purchased the house following a January 1780 fire, and restored and expanded it. Washington was president of the 1787 Constitutional Convention, held at Independence Hall, and Morris was a delegate. Washington was Morris's houseguest for the convention's four-month length, May to September 1787.

In 1790, Philadelphia became the temporary national capital for a ten-year period while what is now Washington, D.C. was under construction. Morris gave up the house for President Washington's use, who insisted on paying rent. Morris also owned the house next door, to which he and his family moved.

In 1951, confusion over the exact location of the Philadelphia President's House led to its surviving walls being unknowingly demolished for what is now Independence Mall. Advocacy by historians and African American groups resulted in the 2010 commemoration of the site as a memorial to the nine slaves in Washington's household and the history of slavery in the United States. In 2025, President Donald Trump issued an executive order to promote a more positive view of the nation's history, resulting in the January 2026 removal of all exhibits at the site, and sparking a lawsuit that saw some of the displays restored for the duration of the case. In July 2026, the Trump administration installed their own pre-approved exhibits at the site.

== History ==
The three-and-a-half-story brick mansion on the south side of Market Street was built in 1767 by widow Mary Lawrence Masters. In 1772, she gave it as a wedding gift to her elder daughter, Polly, who married Richard Penn, the lieutenant-governor of the colony and a grandson of William Penn. Richard Penn entertained delegates to the First Continental Congress, including George Washington, at the house. Penn was entrusted to deliver Congress' Olive Branch Petition to King George III in a last-ditch effort to avoid war between Great Britain and the colonies. Penn, his wife, and in-laws departed for England in July 1775.

During the September-1777-to-June-1778 British occupation of Philadelphia, the house was occupied by General Sir William Howe, who used it as the British Army's American headquarters. Following the British evacuation of the city, it housed the American military governor, Benedict Arnold. Arnold began a secret and treasonous correspondence with the British while living in the house. The next resident was John Holker, a purchasing agent for the French, who were American allies in the war. During Holker's residency, the house suffered a fire.

Robert Morris, a financier of the Revolutionary War and a Founding Father, purchased the house following a January 1780 fire, and restored and expanded it. Transfer of the deed was delayed because of the Revolutionary War. Morris refurbished and expanded the house, and lived there while Superintendent of Finance.

George Washington was elected presiding officer for the May-to-September 1787 U.S. Constitutional Convention, which met at Independence Hall. Washington was Morris's houseguest during the four-month convention. Philadelphia served as the temporary national capital from 1790 to 1800, while Washington, D.C. was under construction. Then U.S. Senator from Pennsylvania Robert Morris gave up the house for use by President Washington, who insisted on paying rent. Morris also owned the house next door, to which he and his family moved.

In November 1790, Washington brought eight enslaved Africans from Mount Vernon to work in his presidential household: Moll, Oney Judge, Christoper Sheels, Austin, Giles, Paris, Hercules Posey, and Posey's son Richmond. A ninth enslaved African from Mount Vernon, "Postilion" Joe, joined the presidential household following Austin's death on December 20, 1794 in Maryland.

President Washington occupied the Philadelphia President's House from November 1790 to March 1797, and Washington's successor, President John Adams, occupied it from March 1797 to May 30, 1800. Adams then visited Washington, D.C., to oversee the transfer of the federal government and returned to his Peacefield home in Quincy, Massachusetts, for the summer. He moved into the not yet completed White House on November 1, 1800, the first U.S. president to live there, and occupied it for just over four months. Thomas Jefferson won the 1800 presidential election, was inaugurated on March 4, 1801, and became the first U.S. president to occupy the White House for his entire presidential term. In the 1804 presidential election, Jefferson was reelected, and resided at the White House during his entire two terms, which lasted from 1801 to 1809.

=== Post-presidential ===
Following President Adams's 1800 departure, the house was converted into Francis's Union Hotel. Hardware merchant Nathaniel Burt purchased the property in 1832, and gutted the house, inserting three narrow stores between its exterior walls. He and his descendants owned these stores for just over a century.

In 1861, merchant John Wanamaker opened his first clothing store, Oak Hall, at 536 Market Street. He expanded into the stores at 532 and 534 Market, and eventually built up their height to six stories. The party wall between 530 and 532 Market was the four-story west wall of the President's House, and would have been incorporated into the expanded Oak Hall. Oak Hall was demolished in 1936, leaving two stories of the party wall intact. The four-story east wall of the President's House was the party wall shared between 524 and 526 Market Street. This survived intact until 1951.

What was left of the Burt stores, along with the house's surviving walls, were demolished in 1951 for the creation of Independence Mall. A public toilet was built upon the house's footprint in 1954, later demolished, and replaced by a memorial site in 2010 after archeology studies. Advocacy by historians and African American groups resulted in the 2010 commemoration of the site. In 2026, the signs mentioning slavery were removed under the direction of the Executive Order titled "Restoring Truth and Sanity to American History" during the second Trump administration (see § Trump executive order and removal of exhibits).

== President Washington in Philadelphia ==
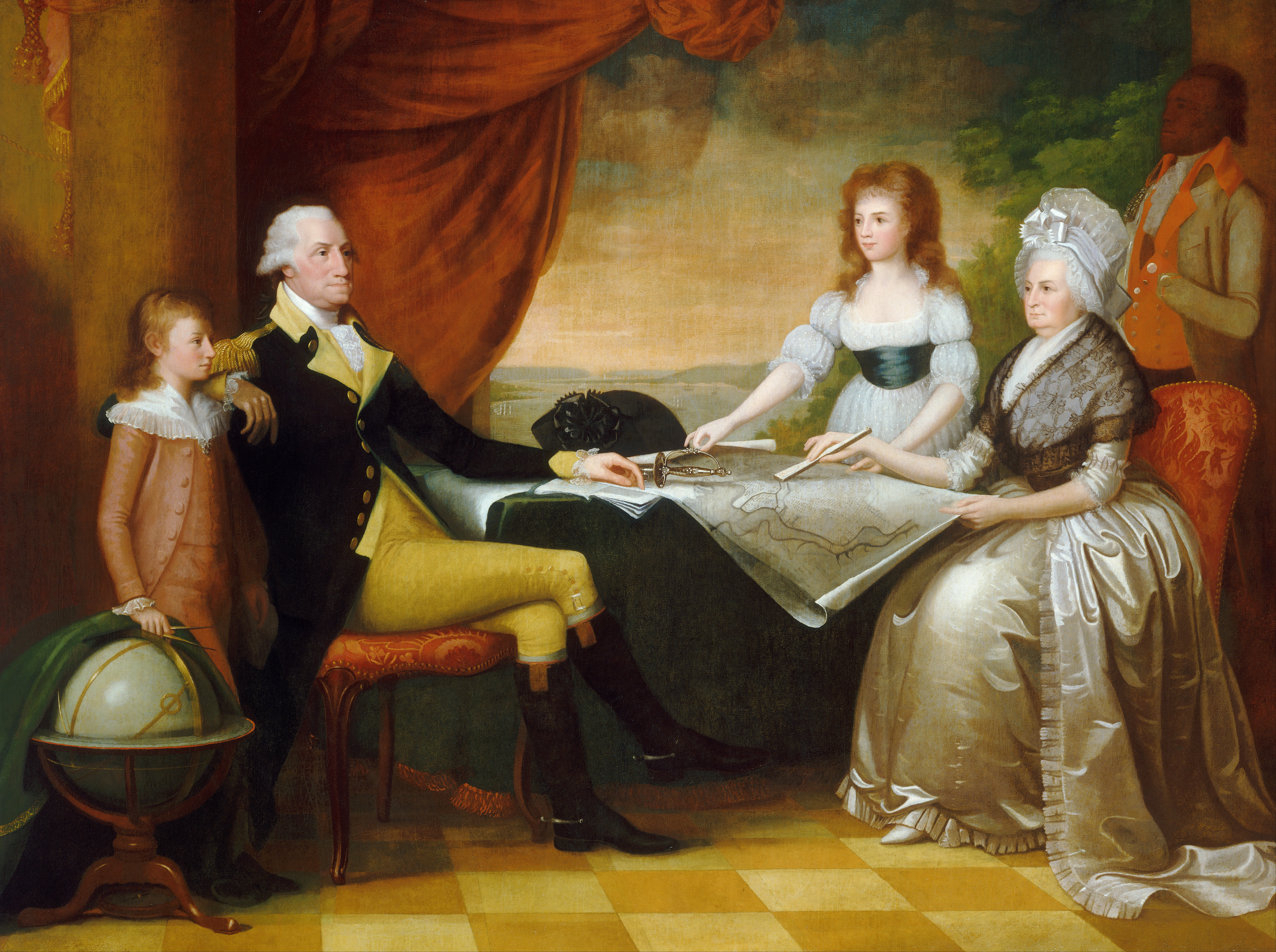
The Washington Family, a painting by Edward Savage completed between 1789 and 1796, depicting (left to right): George Washington Parke Custis, George Washington, Nelly Custis, Martha Washington, and an enslaved servant, probably William Lee or Christopher Sheels

The nation's first president, George Washington, along with First Lady Martha Washington and two of her grandchildren, "Wash" Custis and Nelly Custis, lived in President's House in Philadelphia. He had an initial household staff of about 24, eight of whom were enslaved Africans, plus an office staff of four or five, who also lived and worked there. The house was too small for the 30-plus occupants, so the President made additions:

"...a large two-story bow to be added to south side of the main house making the rooms at the rear thirty-four feet in length, a long one-story servants' hall to be built on the east side of the kitchen ell, the bathtubs to be removed from the bath house's second floor and the bathingroom turned into the President's private office, additional servant rooms to be constructed, and an expansion of the stables."

=== Major actions as president ===
- Oversaw the establishment of the federal judiciary
- Oversaw the establishment, location and planning of the future District of Columbia.
- Quashed the Whiskey Rebellion in western Pennsylvania.

=== Use of slave labor ===
In 1790, President Washington brought eight enslaved Africans to Philadelphia from his plantation at Mount Vernon: Moll, Christopher Sheels, Hercules and his son Richmond, Oney Judge and her half-brother Austin, Giles, and Paris.

Pennsylvania had begun a gradual abolition of slavery in 1780, freezing the number of slaves in the state and granting freedom only to their future children. The law did not free anyone at once; its gradual abolition was to be accomplished over decades as the enslaved aged and died off. The law allowed slaveholders from other states to hold personal slaves in Pennsylvania for six months, but empowered those same enslaved to legally petition for their freedom if held beyond that period.

Washington recognized that slavery was unpopular in Philadelphia, but argued (privately) that he remained a resident of Virginia and subject to its laws on slavery. He gradually replaced most of the President's House enslaved servants with German indentured servants, and rotated the others in and out of the state to prevent them from establishing an uninterrupted six-month residency. He was also careful that he himself never spent six continuous months in Pennsylvania. Joe (Richardson) was the only slave added to the presidential household. He was brought up from Virginia in 1795, following Austin's December 20, 1794, death in Maryland.

==== Oney Judge ====
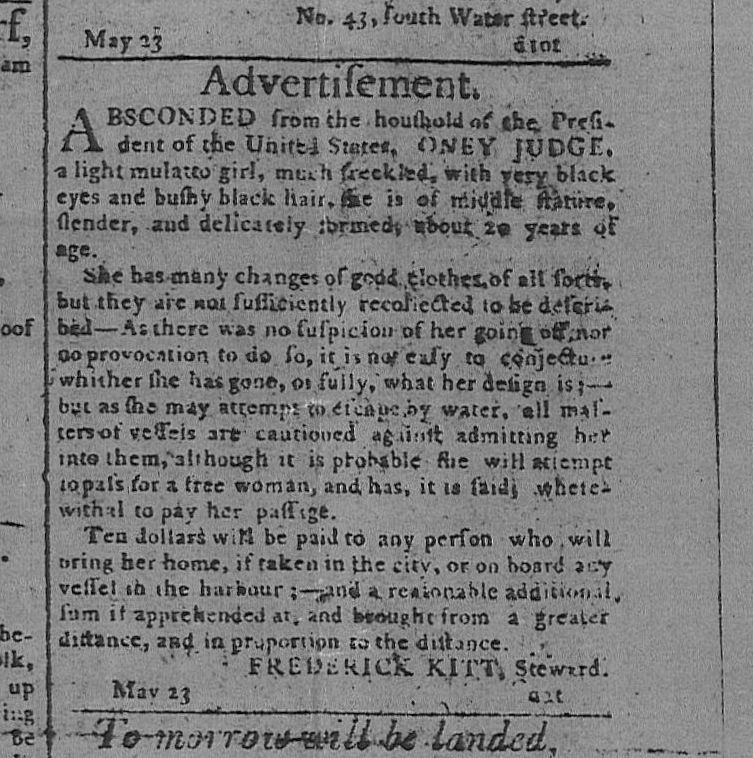
A 1796 runaway advertisement for Oney Judge, one of nine slaves held by Washington at President's House in Philadelphia

Oney Judge was the personal slave of Martha Washington, and was about 17 when she was brought to the President's House in 1790. More is known about her than any of the other enslaved because she gave two interviews to abolitionist newspapers in the 1840s. She escaped to freedom from the President's House in May 1796, and was hidden by Philadelphia's free-black community. Oney Judge had also a 10 dollar reward for her return to the Washington's, which was a lot of money back in the 1700's, (Approximately $200 USD.) The President's House steward placed runaway advertisements in Philadelphia newspapers offering a reward for her recapture. She was smuggled aboard a ship to Portsmouth, New Hampshire, where Judge hoped she was safe, but she was recognized on the street by a friend of the Washingtons. Through intermediaries, Washington attempted to convince her to return, but Judge refused unless she was guaranteed her freedom upon their deaths. Martha Washington's nephew, Burwell Bassett, traveled to Portsmouth in 1798. He lodged with Senator John Langdon and revealed his plan to abduct Judge. Langdon sent word for Judge to go into hiding, and Bassett was forced to return without her.

==== Hercules ====
Hercules was the chief cook at Mount Vernon in 1786, and was brought to the President's House in November 1790 to run the kitchen. He requested that his 12-year-old son Richmond accompany him, but Richmond spent less than a year in Philadelphia. Much of what is known about Hercules comes from a nostalgic and affectionate account by Martha Washington's grandson, who presumed that "Uncle Harkless" had been content in slavery. Stephen Decatur Jr., author of The Private Affairs of George Washington (1933), wrote that Hercules had escaped to freedom in Philadelphia at the end of Washington's presidency, and for 79 years this was accepted as true. Research published in 2012 establishes that Hercules escaped to freedom from Mount Vernon on February 22, 1797, Washington's 65th birthday.

Hercules left behind Richmond and daughters Evey and Delia at Mount Vernon. There was a reported sighting of him in New York City in 1801, but by then he had been freed under the terms of George Washington's will. The mystery of his journey after escaping Mount Vernon seems to have been solved in 2019. Genealogist Sara Krasne, searching records at the Westport Historical Society in Massachusetts, found a Hercules Posey, born in Virginia, who died of consumption on May 15, 1812, age 64, and was buried in the Second African Burying Ground in New York City. John Posey was the Virginia slaveholder who mortgaged Hercules to George Washington in 1767, and later defaulted on the loan.

== Archaeology and advocacy ==
=== Liberty Bell Center ===
As the turn of the 21st century approached, a major new building to house the Liberty Bell was planned for Independence Mall. Nearly the length of a football field, including its 40 ft (12 m) porch, the Liberty Bell Center would stretch along the east side of Sixth Street from Chestnut Street almost to Market Street.

==== 2000 archaeology ====
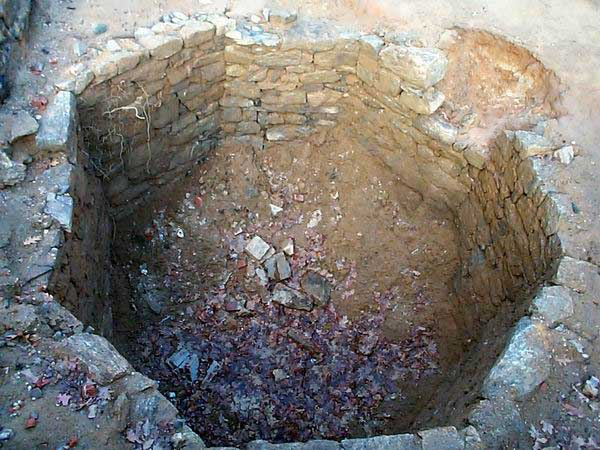
The icehouse pit, which was excavated in December 2000 and reburied beneath the Liberty Bell Center

An archaeological excavation of the Liberty Bell Center's footprint was undertaken in November and December 2000. The most significant President's House-related artifact uncovered was the bottom half of its icehouse pit. A technological marvel built by Robert Morris in the early 1780s, the icehouse had been a windowless building erected over an octagonal stone-walled pit, 13 ft (4.0 m) in diameter and 18 ft (5.5 m) deep. In midwinter the pit would be packed with blocks of ice harvested from the Schuylkill River. The icehouse provided refrigeration for most of the year:

The Door for entering this Ice house faces the north, a Trap Door is made in the middle of the Floor through which the Ice is put in and taken out. I find it best to fill with Ice which as it is put in should be broke into small pieces and pounded down with heavy Clubs or Battons such as Pavers use, if well beat it will after a while consolidate into one solid mass and require to be cut out with a Chizell or Axe. I tried Snow one year and lost it in June. The Ice keeps until October or November and I believe if the Hole was larger so as to hold more it would keep untill Christmas..."

The truncated icehouse pit was measured and photographed by the National Park Service, and then reburied. It lies beneath the concrete slab of the Liberty Bell Center's floor.

==== Presidential slavery campaign ====
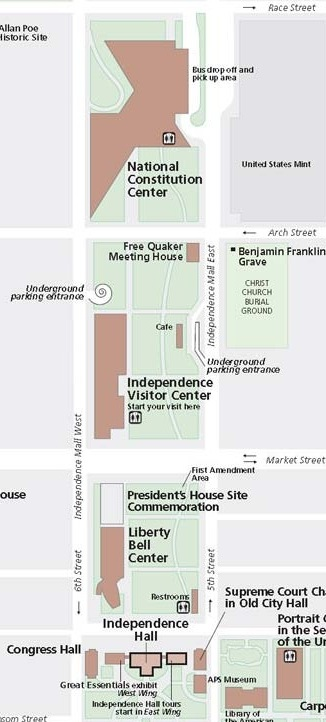
The President's House site is located just north of the Liberty Bell Center.

Abolitionists gave the Liberty Bell its name in the 1830s, and adopted it as their emblem for the movement to end slavery in America. In 1790, Washington brought eight enslaved Africans from Mount Vernon to Philadelphia to work in his presidential household. He directed that his white coachman and enslaved stableworkers be housed in a building behind the kitchen. The footprint of this building was located under the porch of the planned Liberty Bell Center, about five feet (1.5 m) from the LBC's main entrance. The Liberty Bell Center was under construction in January 2002, when the Historical Society of Pennsylvania published Edward Lawler, Jr.'s research on the President's House, including the revelation that future visitors to the LBC would "walk over" the footprint of Washington's "slave quarters" as they entered the new building.

In a March 12, 2002, evening lecture at the Arch Street Friends Meeting House and an interview the next morning on WHYY-FM, Philadelphia's National Public Radio affiliate, UCLA historian Gary Nash scathingly criticized Independence Park for its refusal to interpret the enslaved Africans at the President's House site. Independence National Historical Park Superintendent Martha Aikens countered with an op-ed proposing that the enslaved be interpreted at the Germantown White House, some eight miles (13 km) miles away. Nash's anger inspired the founding of the Ad Hoc Historians, a group of Philadelphia-area scholars whose immediate concern was the interpretation for the under-construction Liberty Bell Center.

The issue led to the formation of two African-American groups that advocated for the enslaved: Avenging the Ancestors Coalition, founded by attorney Michael Coard; and Generations Unlimited, founded by local historian Charles Blockson and activist Sacaree Rhodes. Coard delivered a petition signed by 15,000 people to Independence Park urging it to build a memorial to the President's House and Washington's slaves.

The Philadelphia Inquirer published a front-page, banner-headlined article on Sunday, March 24, 2002, "Echos of Slavery at Liberty Bell Site." This included a terse statement from Independence Park: "The Liberty Bell is its own story, and Washington's slaves are a different one better told elsewhere." The Inquirer followed up with more major articles, and its lead editorial on March 27 was titled: "Freedom and Slavery. Just as they coexisted in the 1700s, both must be part of the Liberty Bell's story." The Inquirer published an op-ed by Nash and St. Joseph's University historian Randall Miller on Sunday, March 31, alongside one by Rutgers University historian Charlene Mires. The next day, the Associated Press issued a national story: "Historians Decry Liberty Bell Site."

NPS Chief Historian Dwight Pitcaithley wrote to Independence Park's superintendent, urging her to consider a different perspective:

The contradiction in the founding of the country between freedom and slavery becomes palpable when one actually crosses through a slave quarters site when entering a shrine to a major symbol of the abolition movement....How better to establish the proper historical context for understanding the Liberty Bell than by talking about the institution of slavery? And not the institution as generalized phenomenon, but as lived by George Washington's own slaves. The fact that Washington's slaves Hercules and Oney Judge sought and gained freedom from this very spot gives us interpretive opportunities other historic sites can only long for. This juxtaposition is an interpretive gift that can make the Liberty Bell "experience" much more meaningful to the visiting public. We will have missed a real educational opportunity if we do not act on this possibility.

Pitcaithley read Independence Park's interpretive script for the Liberty Bell Center's exhibits, and found it disappointing. He described it as "an exhibit to make people feel good but not to think," that "works exactly against NPS's new thinking," and "would be an embarrassment if it went up." Members of the Ad Hoc Historians, ATAC, and Generations Unlimited participated in a May 13, 2002, planning session on the LBC interpretation, overseen by Pitcaithley. Later in the month, he assembled a panel of top NPS historians to rewrite the interpretation.

=== President's House site ===
The Philadelphia City Council and the Pennsylvania General Assembly each passed resolutions urging the National Park Service to interpret the story of the enslaved Africans at the President's House site. In July 2002, a provision was inserted into the FY2003 Department of Interior appropriation bill requiring NPS to study this and report back to the U.S. Congress.

A design process for the President's House site began in October 2002, although it was boycotted by Generations Unlimited. Preliminary designs for the site were unveiled at a January 15, 2003, public meeting at the African American Museum in Philadelphia. These were angrily rejected by most of those present, and the design team withdrew from the project. Philadelphia City Council appropriated $1.5 million toward a commemoration of the site, which Mayor John Street announced at the Liberty Bell Center's opening, October 9, 2003.

A second design process was undertaken as a joint project by Independence Park and the City of Philadelphia. Congressmen Chakka Fatah and Robert Brady secured $3.6 million in federal funds for the project, which they jointly announced on September 6, 2005.

A national design competition for the President's House site was announced in late 2005, and more than twenty teams of architects, artists and historians submitted proposals. Six of these teams were selected as semi-finalists, and were given stipends to create models and finished drawings. The models and drawings were exhibited at the National Constitution Center and the African American Museum in Summer 2006, and the public had several weeks to comment and cast votes for their favorite design. Philadelphia architectural firm Kelly Maiello Architects was announced as the winner of the design competition on February 27, 2007.

==== 2007 archaeology ====
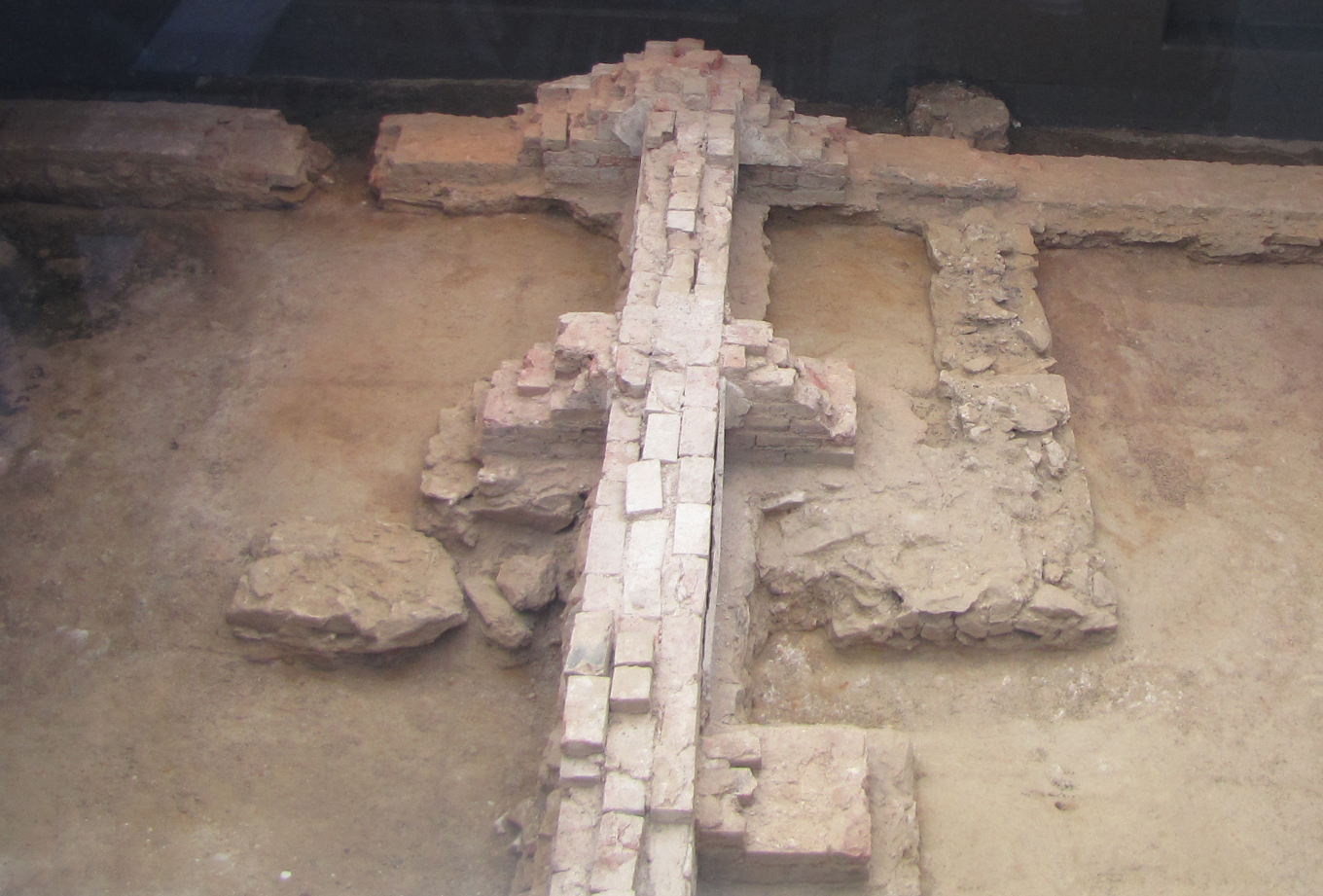
The brick foundations at center belong to one of the 1832 stores. The L-shaped stone foundations under it belong to the President's House kitchen.

A second archaeological excavation was begun on March 27, 2007. This was focused on the house's backbuildings, and a temporary observation platform was erected atop the footprint of the main house.

Early discoveries included brick foundations of the three Burt stores, built between the exterior walls of the gutted house. Excavation of the kitchen established that it had a basement, and a section of this had a root cellar below it. At the juncture of the kitchen's foundations and the stores' was found an 1833 coin, possibly left by the builders to mark their completed work. As the stores' plaster cellar floors were chipped away, older foundations were revealed beneath them.

The excavation uncovered the rear wall of the main house and, most surprisingly, much of the curved foundation of Washington's bow window. This two-story semi-circular expansion of the State Dining Room (and the State Drawing Room above it) was designed by the President to be a ceremonial space in which he would receive guests. "There can be little doubt that in Washington's bow can be found the seed that was later to flower in the oval shape of the Blue Room [of the White House]."

Hundreds of thousands of people visited the observation platform between March and July 2007. As the excavation's closing approached, the City and Independence Park issued a joint press release:

More than a quarter million visitors have stood at the public viewing platform to witness this extraordinary place, to learn from the archaeologists, and to interact with each other on important topics such as race relations in the United States. The reaction to the site has served as a signal that the President's House site has the potential to become a major national icon in the heart of the City.

The excavation was closed with a July 31 ceremony that included speeches, the dedication of a bronze plaque listing the names of the nine enslaved held at the site, a prayer, and the African ritual of spilling of sand and water as oblations.

== President's House Memorial ==
Completed in 2010, the memorial, President's House: Freedom and Slavery in the Making of a New Nation, is an open-air pavilion that shows the outline of the original buildings and allows visitors to view the remaining foundations. Some artifacts are displayed within the pavilion. Signage and video exhibits portrayed the history of the structure, as well as the roles of Washington's slaves in his household and slaves in American society, until the federal government removed the exhibits in 2026. CBS described it as the only federal historic site to commemorate the history of slavery in the United States. The memorial was a joint project of the City of Philadelphia and the National Park Service.

Memorial at the site of the former President's House.

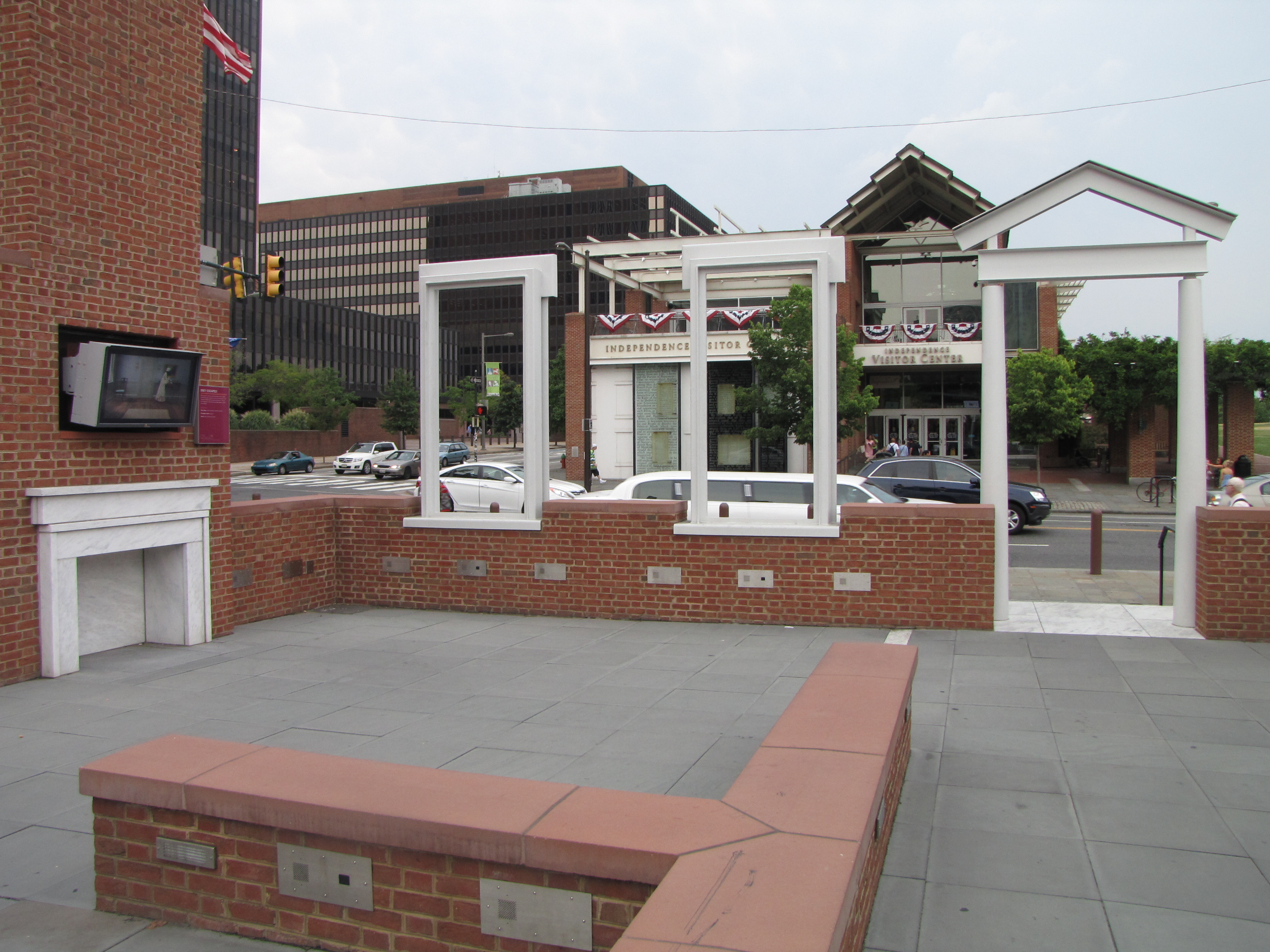
President's House Memorial, looking north.

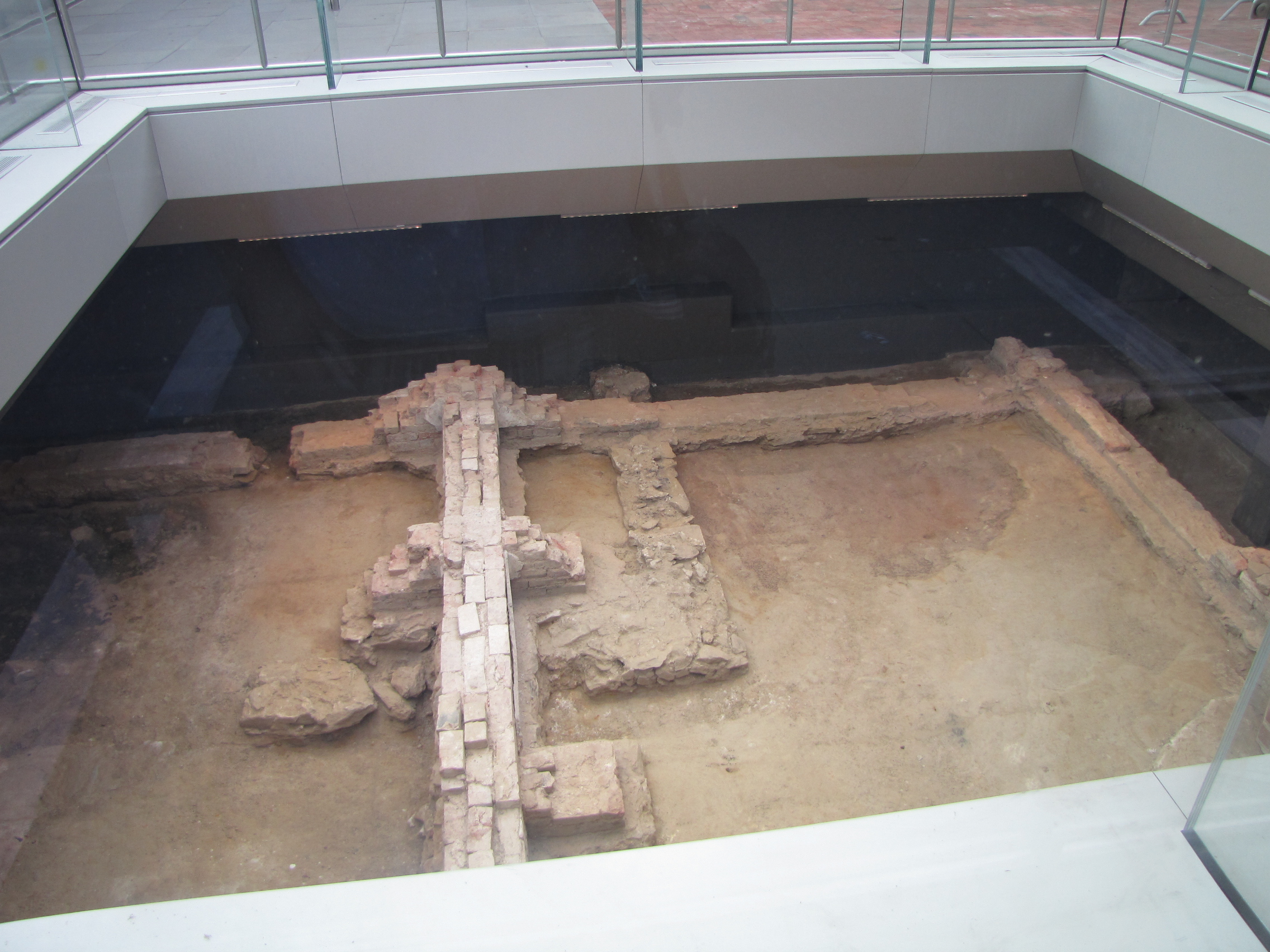
Kitchen foundations

=== Trump executive order and removal of exhibits ===
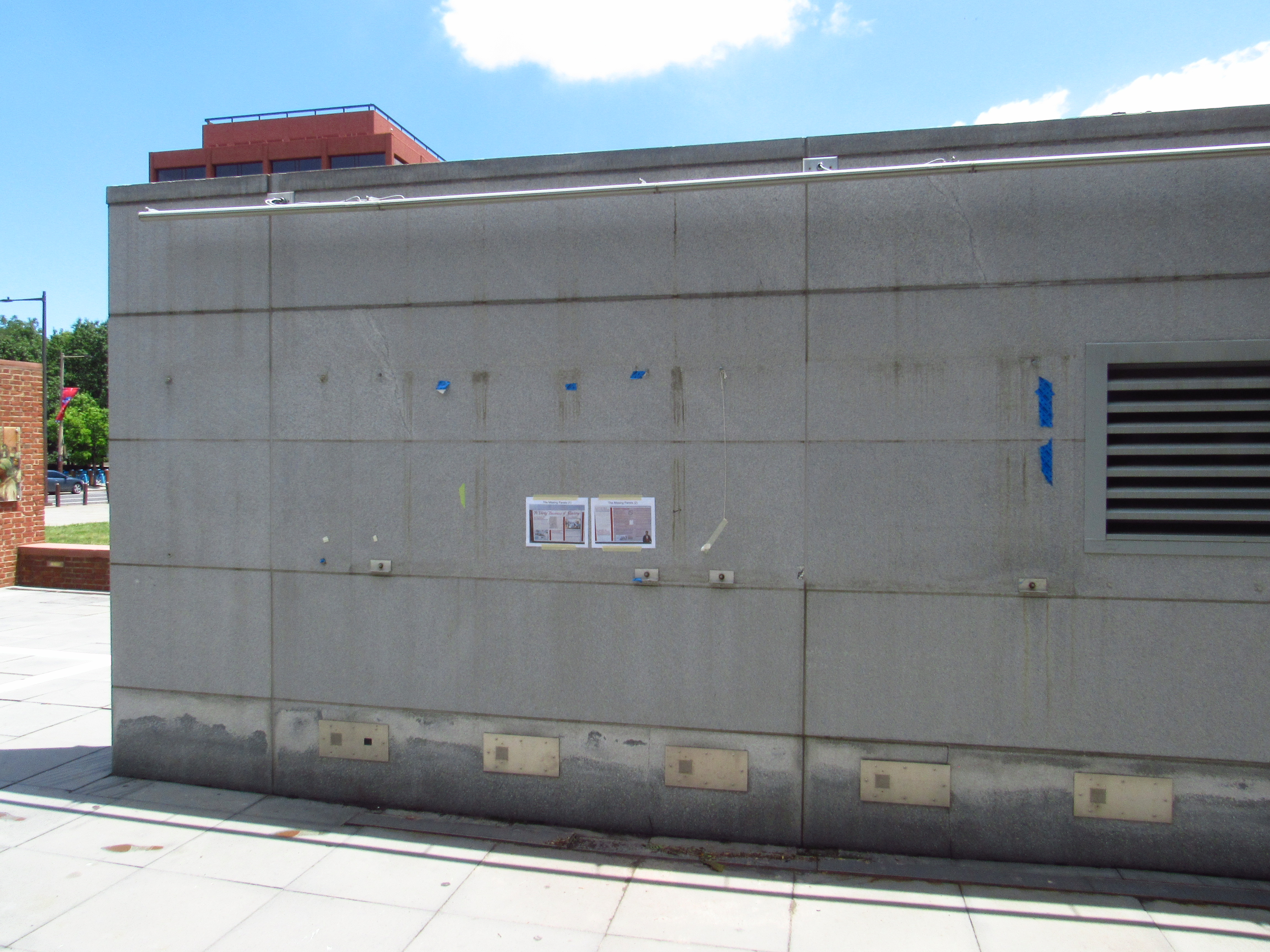
The hooks and markings are still visible from where the panels once hung. Someone has taped printouts of them to the wall.

In March 2025, President Donald Trump signed Executive Order 14253, "Restoring Truth and Sanity to American History." In it he directed the Interior Department, which oversees the National Park Service, to ensure memorials do not "inappropriately disparage Americans past or living" and "instead focus on the greatness of the achievements and progress of the American people or, with respect to natural features, the beauty, abundance, and grandeur of the American landscape." The Service initiated a review of all its 433 national parks, monuments, and historic sites. Employees were told to report items for review for removal, and to post signs and QR codes at all sites. Both went up in Independence Park, asking viewers to report repairs, service improvements, or "any signs or other information that are negative about either past or living Americans or that fail to emphasize the beauty, grandeur, and abundance of landscapes and other natural features."

At the President's House, 13 items across six exhibits were reported. Asked for confirmation, an Interior Department spokesperson replied: “As the President has stated, federal historic sites and institutions should present history that is accurate, honest and reflective of shared national values,” and “Interpretive materials that focus solely on challenging aspects of U.S. history, without acknowledging broader context or national progress, may unintentionally provide an incomplete understanding rather than enrich it.” All exhibit panels were removed and videos taken down on January 22, 2026, not just the flagged items, leaving the President's House with only the names of the nine slaves engraved into a cement wall. (Note: The removal of non-compliant displays had initially been slated for September 17, 2025.) Politico reported that the Interior Department did not answer questions about what would replace the removed exhibits.

Items flagged for review
A partial list of submissions by park staff, reported by The Philadelphia Inquirer and The New York Times citing internal materials.
Exhibit	Reason given
"Life Under Slavery"	"speaks of whipping, depriving of food, clothing, and shelter; as well as beating, torturing, and raping those they enslaved"
"History Lost & Found"	"The first paragraph mentions history being both admirable and deplorable, with the President’s House being a stark focus of that definition. The second paragraph uses words ‘profoundly disturbing’ to describe Washington transporting enslaved people. It also says as the new federal government embraced the lofty concept of liberty, slavery in the President’s House mocked the pretense of liberty"
"The Dirty Business of Slavery"	"The 4th paragraph has a sentence about the enslaved population growth and mentions births to enslaved women resulting from rape by white men and forced breeding"
"An Act respecting Fugitives from Justice" (single illustration)	Depicts Washington's arms signing the Fugitive Slave Act of 1793 in the foreground and white men shooting escaping black slaves in the background. “The following panels and illustrations may need revision if found that they are inappropriately disparaging to historical figures".

City of Philadelphia v. Burgum
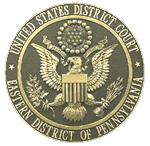
- Court: Eastern District of Pennsylvania
- Full case name: City of Philadelphia v. Doug Burgum, Secretary of the Interior, United States Department of the Interior, Jessica Bowron, Acting Director of the National Park Service
- Started: January 22, 2026
- Docket nos.: 2:26-cv-00434

Court membership
- Judge sitting: Cynthia M. Rufe

The city of Philadelphia filed a lawsuit the same day, with city officials saying the removal violated a long-standing cooperative agreement that required consultation before alterations, and pointing out the panels were funded primarily by the city and private donations, not the federal government. White House spokesman Davis Ingle said in a statement that President Trump "continues to fulfill his promise to restore truth and common sense to the United States and its institutions" and "is ensuring that we are honoring the fullness of the American story instead of distorting it in the name of left-wing ideology". The Interior Department said in another that it was taking appropriate action in accordance with the order and called the lawsuit frivolous, aimed at "demeaning our brave Founding Fathers who set the brilliant road map for the greatest country in the world."

On February 16, federal judge Cynthia M. Rufe granted a preliminary injunction, a temporary measure to restore the displays while the case played out in court. Rufe said unilateral changes had violated federal law and agreements requiring consent of the city, and that additionally the exhibits about Oney Judge were essential to the site's selection under a 1998 law meant to commemorate the National Underground Railroad Network to Freedom. Rufe had expressed horror over the government's argument that it gets to choose the message it wants to convey, and in her ruling stated "As if the Ministry of Truth in George Orwell’s 1984 now existed, with its motto 'Ignorance is Strength,' this Court is now asked to determine whether the federal government has the power it claims—to dissemble and disassemble historical truths when it has some domain over historical facts. It does not." She wrote that the government was not prevented from conveying whatever message it wanted to elsewhere, but not at the President's House until it followed the law and consulted with the city. The Interior Department said in a statement that "updated interpretive materials providing a fuller account of the history of slavery at Independence Hall would have been installed in the coming days".

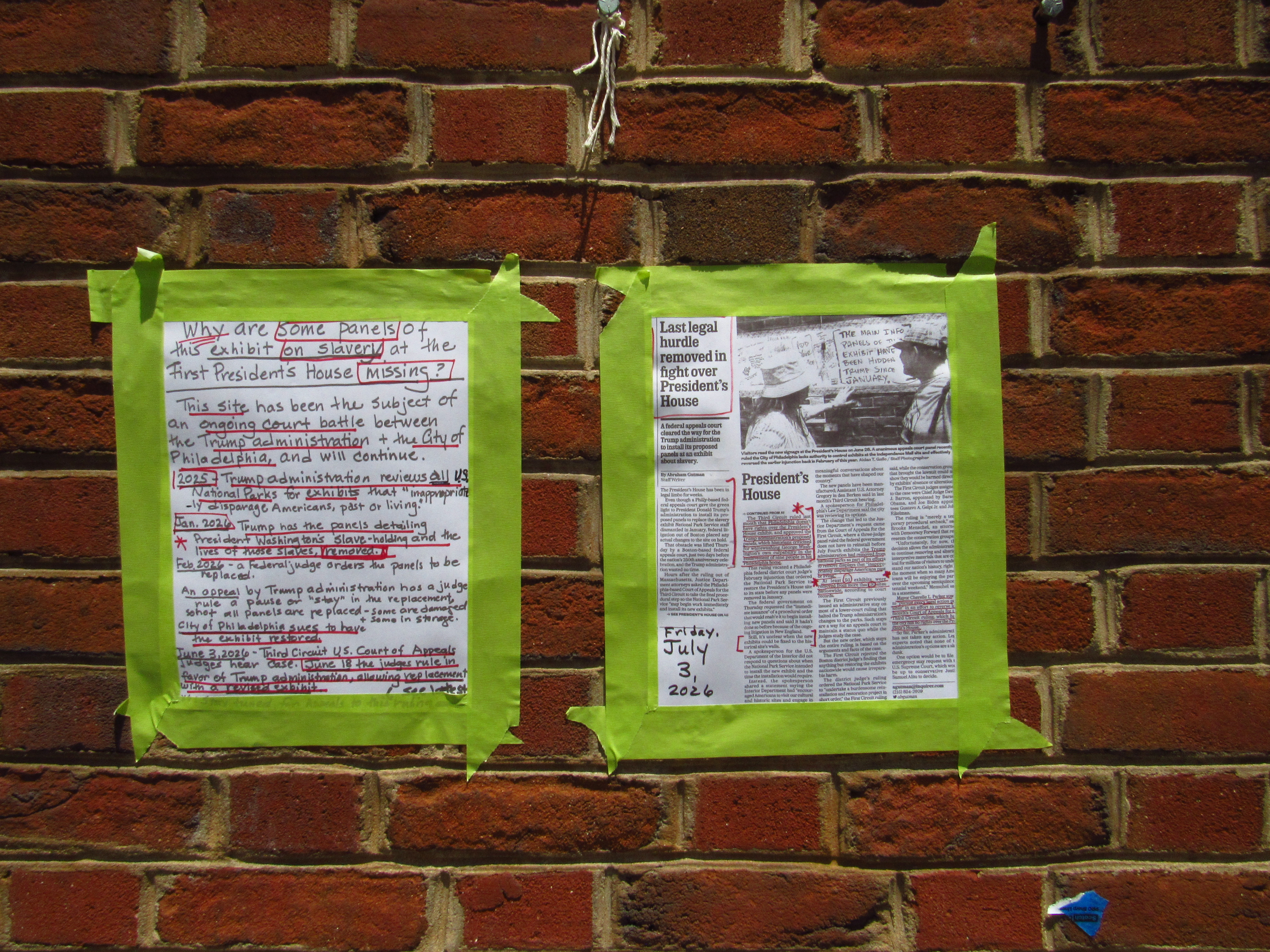
Papers found taped to the stripped down walls at the President's House exhibit talking about the removal of the signage.

The administration restored some of the displays after Judge Rufe, two days later, gave it until February 20. An hour before the government was going to miss the deadline, Third Circuit judge Thomas Hardiman partially granted its appeal, so that the remaining displays do not need to be returned, and forbade changes to the President's House, so that those already back must remain. The Philadelphia Inquirer reported that 16 of 17 glass panels were reinstalled on February 19, with the remaining one needing repairs, and that this was out of the site's 34 panels total. The Philadelphia Tribune, citing a government filing, added that videos ran again on four of five monitors (with the fifth not working when exhibits were removed) and four other panels were reinstalled. The remaining glass panel needed repairs on its mounting bolts and the 13 metal panels needed a process to readhere. The Inquirer reported further decisions as being unlikely before May.

On June 18, the third circuit ruled that the Trump administration could replace the exhibit. The city appealed the decision. On July 15, the Trump administration installed new plaques which shifted the focus away from Washington and his slaves and toward civil rights and the history of the Executive Branch. For example, the exhibit titled "The Dirty Business of Slavery" was replaced with "Celebrating Independence Throughout the Years". The plaques discuss early anti-slavery movements and laws, emphasized the lack of the words "slave" and "slavery" appearing in the constitution, and presented George Washington as an abolitionist. The Trump administration also ordered armed guards and mobile surveillance trailers to patrol the site.

Residents protested the review and removal repeatedly. The architecture firm responsible for the memorial issued a statement opposing changes to the site and the city's main tourism agency, a nonprofit, offered to find another location open to the public to host the displays if they were removed from the President's House. A local data librarian became a founding member of Save Our Signs, a project to crowdsource a photo archive of national parks' displays. Forty-five local preservation and historical groups sent a letter to Secretary of the Interior Doug Burgum opposing changes to, or removal of, the slavery exhibits. Neighboring counties and Pennsylvania governor Josh Shapiro filed amicus briefs in support of Philadelphia's court case, and the Philadelphia City Council passed a resolution condemning the review. Because of this, National Trust for Historic Preservation included the President's House site on its 2026 list of America's 11 Most Endangered Historic Places.

== See also ==
- Samuel Osgood House, first Presidential mansion
- Alexander Macomb House, second Presidential mansion
- Germantown White House, twice temporarily occupied by President Washington
- White House/Executive Residence, the Washington D.C. home of U.S. presidents and their families
- President's House (Ninth Street), Philadelphia house intended to be the permanent Executive Mansion. Never used by a president.
- List of residences of presidents of the United States
