= Christopher Sheels =

American slave

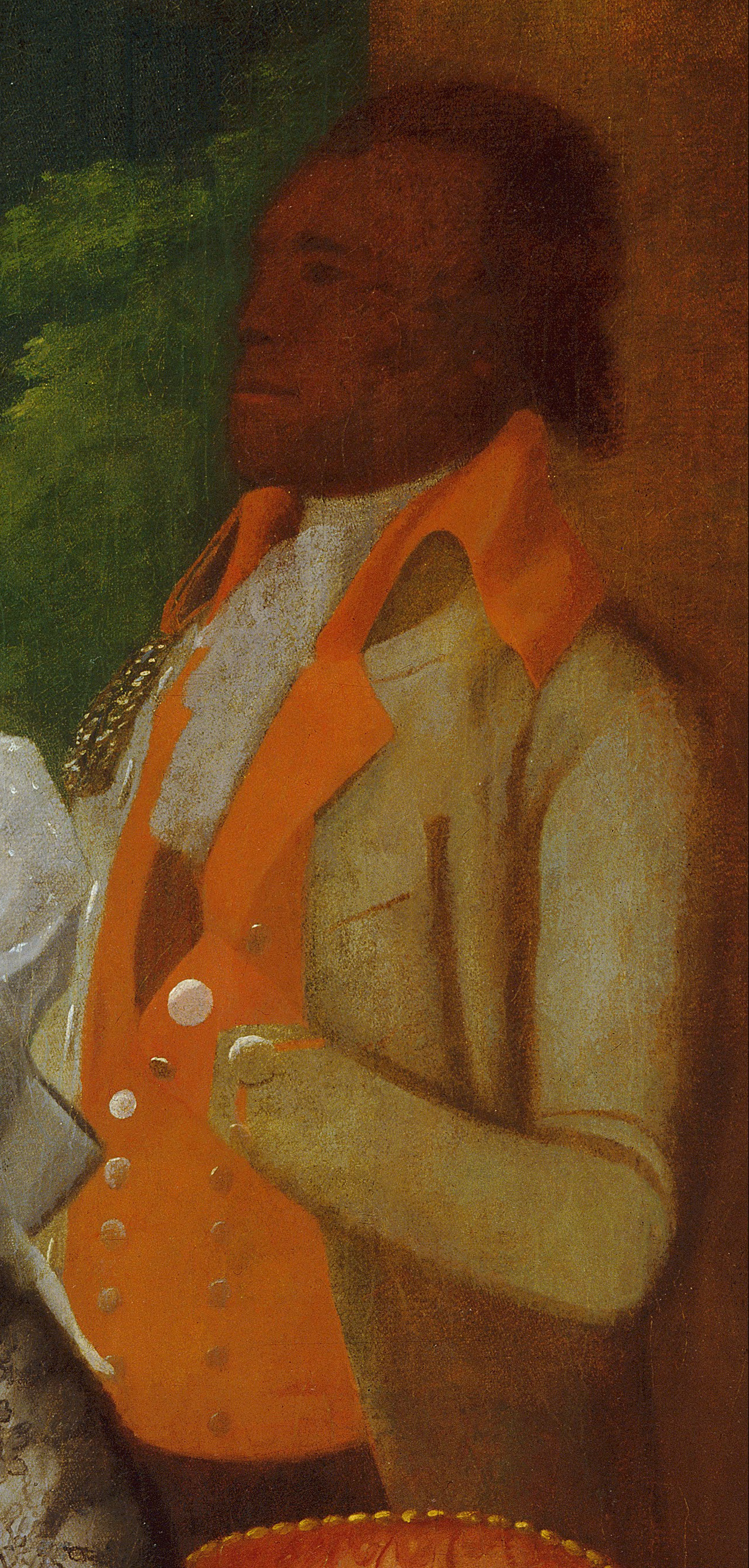
Possible portrait of Sheels from The Washington Family (Edward Savage, 1789–1796)

Christopher Sheels (born c. 1774, Mount Vernon, Virginia – year and place of death unknown), was an enslaved man and house servant at George Washington's plantation, Mount Vernon, in Virginia, United States. As a teenager, he worked as Washington's "body servant" in the presidential households in New York City, 1789–90, and Philadelphia, 1790–91. In September 1799, Washington foiled Sheels' attempt to self-emancipate from Mount Vernon. Three months later, he was present at the former president's deathbed.

== Dower slaves ==
Sheels was the property of the estate of Daniel Parke Custis (1711–1757), Martha Washington's first husband. As widow, she was granted the lifetime use of one-third of the Custis Estate slaves, hence the term "dower" slaves. At the time of her January 1759 marriage to George Washington, the dower slaves numbered at least 85 persons.

Under Virginia law, the legal status of a slave was traced through the woman, so all the children of an enslaved mother were also born slaves, no matter who the father was. Multiple generations of dower slaves were born at Mount Vernon. The July 1799 Mount Vernon Slave Census lists 153 dower slaves.

While George Washington freed his 123 slaves through his 1799 will, the dower slaves remained the property of the Custis estate. Following Martha Washington's 1802 death, the Custis estate was settled, and the dower slaves were inherited by the four Custis grandchildren.

== Background ==
Sheels was the son of Alyce (also spelled Alce), an enslaved spinner at the Mansion. His father may have been Christopher Sheldes, a white wagon driver, who worked at Mount Vernon until December 1773, and he is listed as "11 yrs. old" in the February 1786 Mount Vernon Slave Census. His grandmother, "Old Doll," was a cook at the Mansion, and had been among the original dower slaves who were brought to Mount Vernon in 1759.

Will Lee had been Washington's "body servant" through the Revolutionary War, the 1787 Constitutional Convention, and at Mount Vernon. In April 1789, when Washington set out for New York City to be inaugurated as the first President of the United States, Lee was too ill to make the trip. The fourteen-year-old went in Lee's place, although Lee joined Sheels in the presidential household several weeks later. The two were related: Lee's brother was married to Sheels' aunt.

== Presidential households ==
Following ratification of the U.S. Constitution, New York City served as the national capital from December 1788 to December 1790. Washington was inaugurated on April 30, 1789. The first presidential household consisted of about twenty servants, including seven slaves from Mount Vernon — Ona Judge, Austin, Giles, Paris, Moll, Christopher Sheels, and William Lee.

Under the July 1790 Residence Act, Congress moved the national capital to Philadelphia for a ten-year period, while the permanent national capital was under construction in the District of Columbia. The Philadelphia President's House had a larger household, about twenty-four servants initially, including eight slaves from Mount Vernon — Ona Judge, Austin, Giles, Paris, Moll, Hercules, Richmond, and Christopher Sheels.

Will Lee was never part of the Philadelphia presidential household. He was permanently returned to Mount Vernon, where he became the plantation's shoemaker. Following Austin's 1794 death, "Postilion Joe" (Richardson) joined the Philadelphia presidential household.

== Gradual Abolition Act ==
With the 1780 Act for the Gradual Abolition of Slavery, Pennsylvania's government was the first to begin an abolition of slavery. But the state law was very gradual, and highly-respectful of the property rights of slaveholders. It freed only the future children of enslaved mothers. Every person enslaved in Pennsylvania before the law went into effect remained enslaved-for-life. Non-resident slaveholders could keep their slaves for six months while in the state. But, if those slaves were held in Pennsylvania longer than six months, the state law empowered them to legally free themselves.

Philadelphia had functioned as the national capital during the Revolutionary War. When the Gradual Abolition Act was drafted, the federal government had a single branch – Congress – which met in the city. Pennsylvania specifically exempted Congressmen and their personal slaves from the 1780 state law. Ten years later, when the national capital returned to Philadelphia, the U.S. Constitution had been ratified and the federal government had three branches. Members of Congress remained exempt from Pennsylvania's Gradual Abolition Act, however, the law's effects on slaveholding officers of the Judicial and Executive branches remained unclear.

Washington argued, privately, that his presence in Pennsylvania was solely a consequence of Philadelphia's being the temporary seat of the federal government, that he remained a citizen of Virginia, and Pennsylvania law should not apply to him. On the advice of his attorney general, Edmund Randolph, he systematically rotated the President's House slaves in and out of the state to prevent their establishing a six-month continuous residency. This rotation was arguably a violation of a 1788 amendment to the Pennsylvania law, but Washington remained unchallenged through his residency in Philadelphia.

As the first six-month deadline approached in May 1791, Martha Washington took Sheels and Ona Judge on a two-day trip to Trenton, New Jersey, thus voiding their Pennsylvania residencies.

== Mount Vernon ==
Sheels was permanently returned to Mount Vernon by January 1792, where he worked as a waiter, serving the family meals. George Washington completed his second term as President in March 1797, and returned to Virginia.

In September 1799, Washington discovered a note outlining Sheels' and his fiancee's self-emancipation plan. (The note proves that Sheels could read.) Washington prevented their escape. Three months later, Sheels was at George Washington's bedside when Washington died on December 14, 1799.

As a dower slave, Sheels was not among the 123 slaves freed by George Washington under the terms of his 1799 will. Following Martha Washington's 1802 death, Sheels became one of the 153 dower slaves inherited by the four Custis grandchildren. There is no documentation of where he lived the rest of his life or when he died.

== See also ==
- List of enslaved people of Mount Vernon
- George Washington and slavery
- Samuel Osgood House – First Presidential Mansion
- Alexander Macomb House – Second Presidential Mansion
- President's House (Philadelphia) – Third Presidential Mansion
