= Charles Henry Hart =

American art historian, academic administrator (1847–1918)

- Born: February 4, 1847; Philadelphia, Pennsylvania, United States
- Died: July 29, 1918 (aged 71); New York City, New York, United States
- Education: University of Pennsylvania
- Occupations: Art historian, academic administrator, lawyer, author

Charles Henry Hart (February 4, 1847 – July 29, 1918) was an American art historian, academic administrator, and author.

== Biography ==
Charles Henry Hart was born on February 4, 1847, in Philadelphia. He received a classical and scientific education, and studied law. He was admitted to the bar in 1868 and graduated at the University of Pennsylvania the next spring. In 1894, he received severe injuries in a train accident. On recovering, he decided to give up the practice of law and devote himself to literature and art, though even while active as a lawyer he found time for literary activities.

In 1865, he was elected secretary of the Numismatic and Antiquarian Society of Philadelphia, and three years later became its historiographer. He did much literary work in connection with this society. From 1882 to 1902, he was director of the Pennsylvania Academy of the Fine Arts; and in 1893, was chairman of the committee on retrospective American art at the World's Columbian Exposition.

His specialty in art was historical portraiture, in particular the work of Gilbert Stuart. He actively publicized works he believed to be mislabeled, in particular being concerned to prevent the purchase of such works by misled buyers.

In 1915, Hart moved to New York City. He died on July 29, 1918, in New York City.

== Publications ==
His numerous publications include:

- Memoir of William Hickling Prescott, A Historian of Spain, Mexico, and Peru (Boston: D. Clapp & Son, 1868)
- Bibliographia Lincolniana, reprinted under the title Biographical Sketch of Abraham Lincoln (1870)
- Baynes, T. S.; Smith, W. R., eds. (1885). "Philadelphia" . Encyclopædia Britannica. Vol. 18 (9th ed.). New York: Charles Scribner's Sons.
- Abraham Lincoln's Place in History (1900)
- Edward Savage, Painter and Engraver (1905)
- Who Was the Mother of Franklin's Son? (1911)
- Memoirs of the Life and Works of Jean Houdon (1912), in collaboration with E. Biddle
- 'Frauds in Historical Portraiture, or Spurious Portraits of Historical Personages.' (1913) Annual Report of the American Historical Association, 1913: Vol 1, pp. 85-99
