= Deborah Squash =

American slave

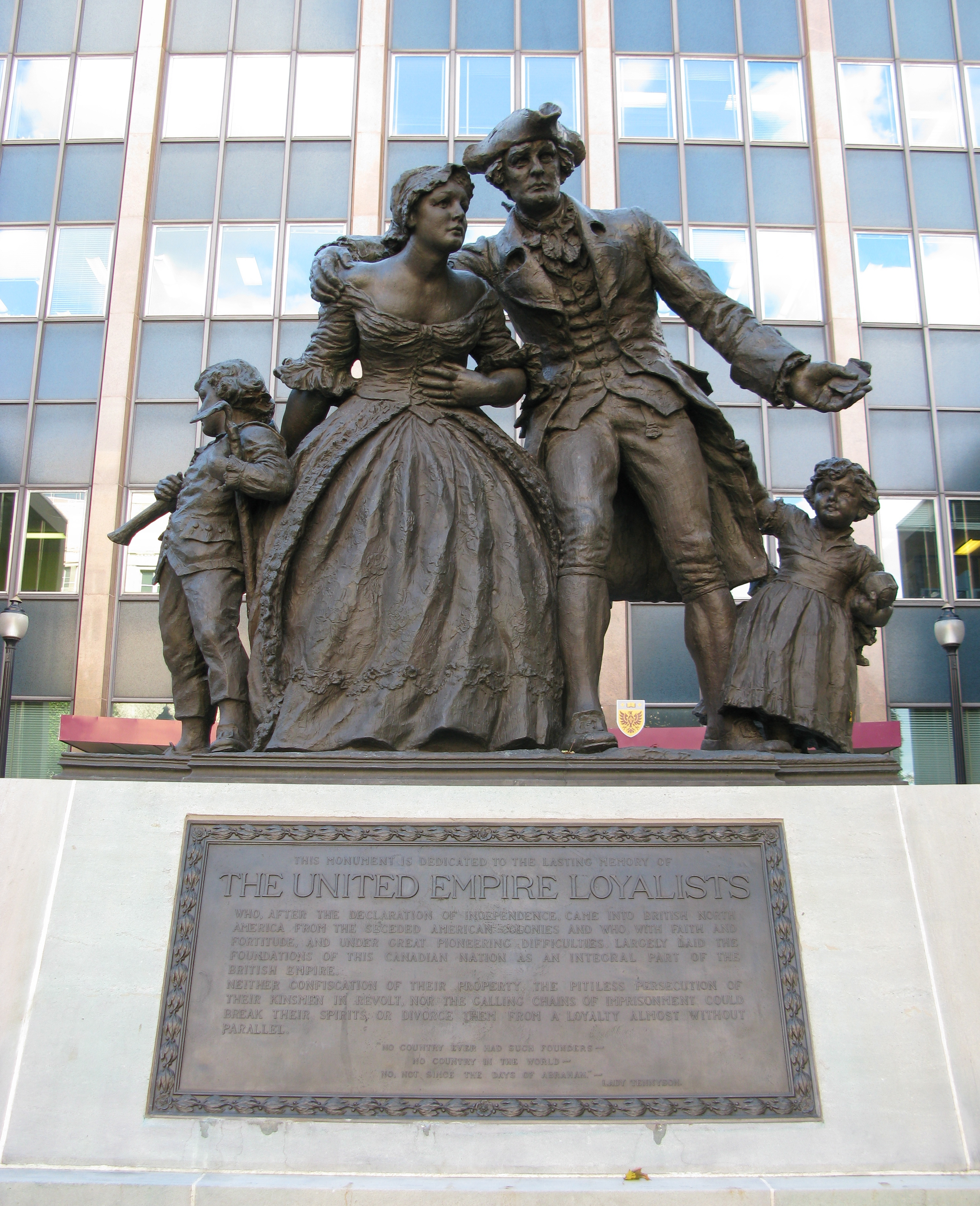
United Empire Loyalists. "This monument is dedicated to the lasting memory of The Union Empire Loyalists who, after the Declaration of Independence, came into British North America from the seceded American colonies and who, with faith and fortitude, and under great pioneering difficulties, largely laid the foundations of this Canadian nation as an integral part of the British Empire. Neither confiscation of their property, the pitiless persecution of their kinsmen in revolt, nor the galling chains of imprisonment could break their spirits, or divorce them from a loyalty almost without parallel. No country ever had such founders -- No country in the world -- No, not since the days of Abraham." — Lady Tennyson

Deborah Squash (born c. 1763–?) was a slave on George Washington's Mount Vernon plantation before she escaped in 1781. She went to New Amsterdam, which was the headquarters for the British during the American Revolution. At the end of the war, she was one of the 3,000 blacks in the Book of Negroes that sailed on a British ship for Nova Scotia.

== Mount Vernon ==
Deborah was enslaved on George and Martha Washington's Mount Vernon plantation as a child. The Washingtons held about 300 slaves, who were expected to work hard. Washington's slaves were considered to have "highly developed skills" and were considered "valuable property". During the American Revolutionary War, Washington was interested in selling off his slaves, particularly single people (to avoid separating husbands and wives), because he was "desperately in need of money". Single African-Americans at Mount Vernon were aware that they could be sold at any time. Nine people were sold in 1779 and Washington had asked his cousin and overseer Lund Washington to check the market for good prices for the remaining single slaves. (Note: Two of the women were terrorized when they were taken off of Mount Vernon.)

== Dunmore's proclamation ==
During the American Revolutionary War, Lord Dunmore, governor of the Colony of Virginia issued a proclamation in 1775 that granted freedom to those who left their owners and joined the ranks of the British Army. Sir Henry Clinton, the British Commander-in-chief at New York, determined that the British were losing the war, and issued the Philipsburg Proclamation (1779) in which any black person who became loyal to the British would receive freedom, protection, and land.

== Escape to New York ==
At age 16, Deborah saw her opportunity to escape on 14 April 1781 when the 16-gun British sloop-of-war HMS Savage arrived within a quarter of a mile from Mount Vernon as her crew sacked and burnt several plantations along the Potomac River. (Note: Deborah stated in 1783 that she was 20 years old, which would have made her year of birth 1763.) Leaving Mount Vernon was a leap of faith—that the British would honor their offer of freedom and that she would be able to acquire a job to support herself.

She and sixteen other enslaved people, all single, ran with her to board Savage. Lund Washington, a cousin of George Washington and an overseer on the plantation, tried to win the escaped slaves back by exchanging them for supplies. Savage's captain, Master and Commander Thomas Graves, took the provisions but refused to return the slaves. (Note: Of the 16 others who ran away, Harry was one of the Nova Scotian Settlers who colonized in Sierra Leone. Daniel Payne is recorded to have sailed to Nova Scotia. Seven were forcibly returned to Mount Vernon following the 1781 siege of Yorktown. The destiny of the remaining seven people is unknown; they could have found freedom or died of disease during the war.) Deborah survived a bout of illness, having acquired smallpox that left her face pock-marked and made her way to British-occupied New York City. Henry Squash, who also escaped enslavement, came to New York City and was sold by Capt. Huddleston of the Royal Artillery to Mr. Lynch. Henry and Deborah were married.

== Transported to Nova Scotia ==
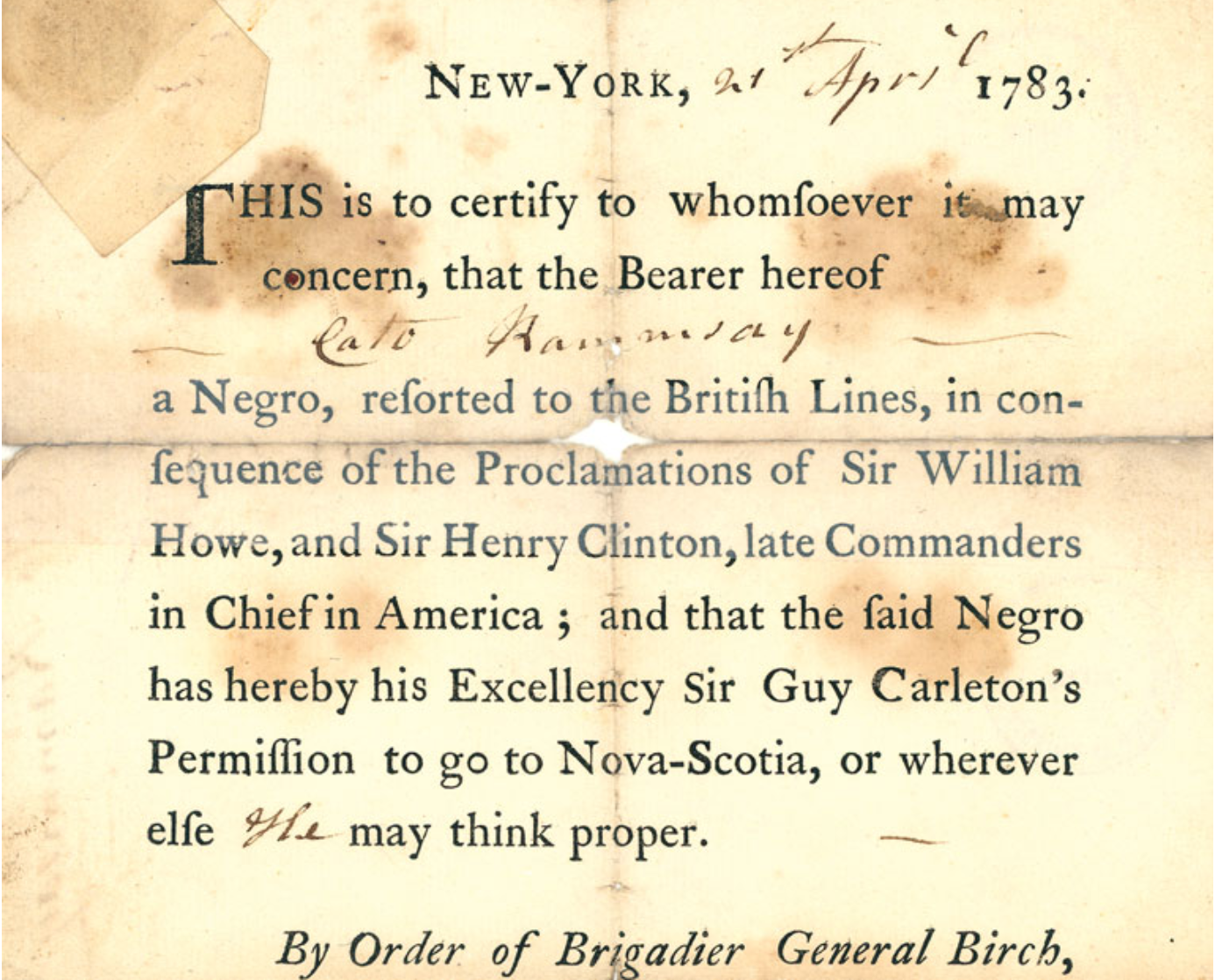
A certificate of freedom and transport, signed by General Samuel Birch "This passport belonged to Cato Ramsay, allowing him to immigrate to Nova Scotia." Nova Scotia Archives.

The war ended in 1783 and under the terms of the Treaty of Paris, the British were forbidden from "carrying away any Negroes, or other Property of the American Inhabitants". Sir Guy Carleton, who was responsible for the evacuation of British forces from the colonies, feared their treatment upon their return to their American enslavers. He refused to return the African-Americans, but offered monetary compensation for each runaway, which was accepted by George Washington. (Note: It is unknown whether the British ever compensated the Americans for the slaves who sailed to Nova Scotia, but Washington said the agreement was "totally different from the Letter and Spirit of the Treaty.") The Book of Negroes listed each black person who boarded a British ship in New York. (Note: There were 114 ships that left New Amsterdam for Nova Scotia between April and November 1783. The blacks, called Black Loyalists, included soldiers who fought in the war, slaves and indentured servants of White Loyalists, and blacks who were born free, bought their freedom, or ran away from their slaveholders.) Deborah was listed as having been about 20 years of age, married to Henry, and was believed to have escaped four years ago. She received her certificate of freedom from General Samuel Birch.

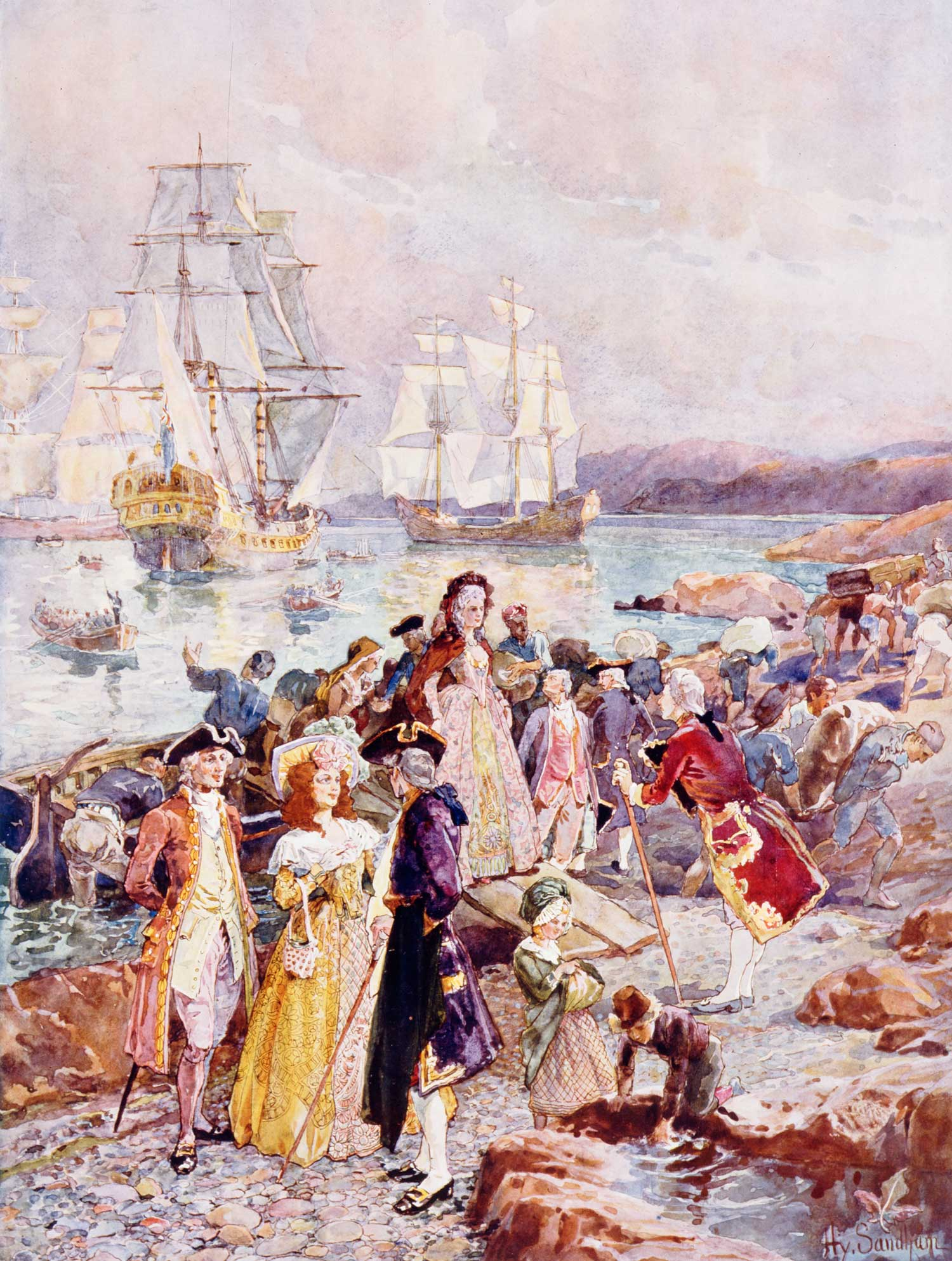
Henry Sandham, The Coming of the Loyalists, 1880–1910

On April 27, 1783, Deborah and Henry boarded a ship named Polly for Port Roseway, Nova Scotia. (Note: In the Book of Negroes, it is recorded that Deborah said that she ran away from Mount Vernon in 1779, but that circumstances with the Savage and record by Lund Washington mean that she left in 1781.) She narrowly missed being returned to Mount Vernon when Washington wrote the following day to the commissioner of embarkation at New York to ask him to hold any of his slaves.

== Nova Scotia ==
Deborah arrived at Port Rosey, but the Canadians were unequipped to manage a large influx of people. Many people initially lived in temporary housing – such as pit houses, tents, or huts. (Note: Pit houses, used by the British Army and black soldiers during the war, were a housing solution where there is not much lumber. A hole is dug out of the ground and a roof is made of canvas and tree trunks.) Although there was promise of land, most people did not receive land, and if they did it was often unsuitable to farm. If a black person had a skill, they took up a trade, but were not paid as much as white people. (Note: There were domestic positions, such as waiters, cooks, bakers, housekeepers, laundresses, seamstresses, tailors, and midwives. Positions related to the shipping trade, including boatbuilders, coopers, sailors, pilots, and navigators. Other positions included shoemakers, carpenters, blacksmiths, teachers, ministers, doctors, and military personnel.) Those who did not have a trade became indentured servants and were treated like slaves. Slavery was legal in Nova Scotia at the time. Angered that blacks were paid less and therefore had more customers, a group of former white soldiers commenced Canada's first race riot in July 1784 when they destroyed the homes of 20 blacks in Port Rosey (now Shelburne). Many blacks died due to illness, poverty, starvation, and harsh winters. Able to freely worship, blacks found religion and spiritual songs to help them cope with their hardships.

Within about a year after she arrived in Port Rosey, she settled in Birchtown, Nova Scotia, where she appears on the Birchtown Muster of 1784. By that time, she is no longer with Henry Squash, who has presumed to have died. She is listed as Deborah Lynch, living in a house with Mr. Lynch. (Note: Peter Lynch, a farmer lived along Roseway River in 1786 and 1787. He was identified as one of the slaveholders in the Shelburne County (Birchtown / Port Rosey). He attended a meeting in 1782 of White Loyalists in New York regarding establishing a town at Port Rosey, with arrangements beginning in 1783.) In the same house was Neil Robinson, who is believed to have changed his name from Jack Neal. (Note: Jack Neal, 23 years of age, escaped from the estate of James Robinson in Kemps Landing, Virginia about 1776. He was with the Royal Artillery, and was given his certificate of freedom by General Thomas Musgrave. He traveled with other people who were with the Royal artillery to Port Mouton, Nova Scotia on the Ranger on or after November 30, 1783. He then went to Birchtown. Jack Neal arrived at Port Mouton, 50.2 kilometres (31.2 miles) north of where Deborah arrived at Port Rosey (now called Shelburne, Nova Scotia), which was 6.2 kilometres (3.9 miles) north of Birchtown, for a total distance from Port Mouton to Birchtown of 56.4 kilometres (35.0 miles). All three towns were along the Atlantic coast.)

Of about 1,500 Black Loyalists who settled in Shelburne County, Nova Scotia, most settled in Port Rosey and some settled in the town of Birchtown, which was named after General Samuel Birch. Colonel Stephen Blucke, a Black Loyalist, led the Black Pioneers in the construction of the towns of Port Rosey and Birchtown.

== Legacy ==
The story of her life and what it was like to be a slave was told in the book "Slavery in New York," which became an exhibit in New York.

== See also ==
- List of enslaved people of Mount Vernon
- George Washington and slavery
