= Sarah Johnson (Mount Vernon) =

Caretaker of Mount Vernon

Sarah Johnson (September 29, 1844 – January 25, 1920) was an African American woman who was born into slavery at Mount Vernon, George Washington's estate in Fairfax, Virginia. She worked as a domestic, cleaning and caring for the residence. During the process, she became an informal historian of all of the mansion's furnishings. After the end of the Civil War, she was hired by the Mount Vernon Ladies' Association, ultimately becoming a council member of the organization. She bought four acres of Mount Vernon land to establish a small farm. The book Sarah Johnson's Mount Vernon (2008) tells the story of her life within the complex community of people who inhabited Mount Vernon.

== Background ==
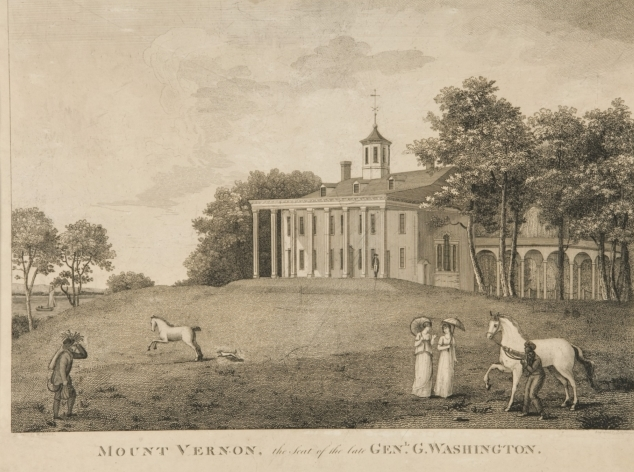
Mount Vernon, engraving and etching, by the American artist S. Seymour, after the English artist William Russell Birch. Yale University Art Gallery

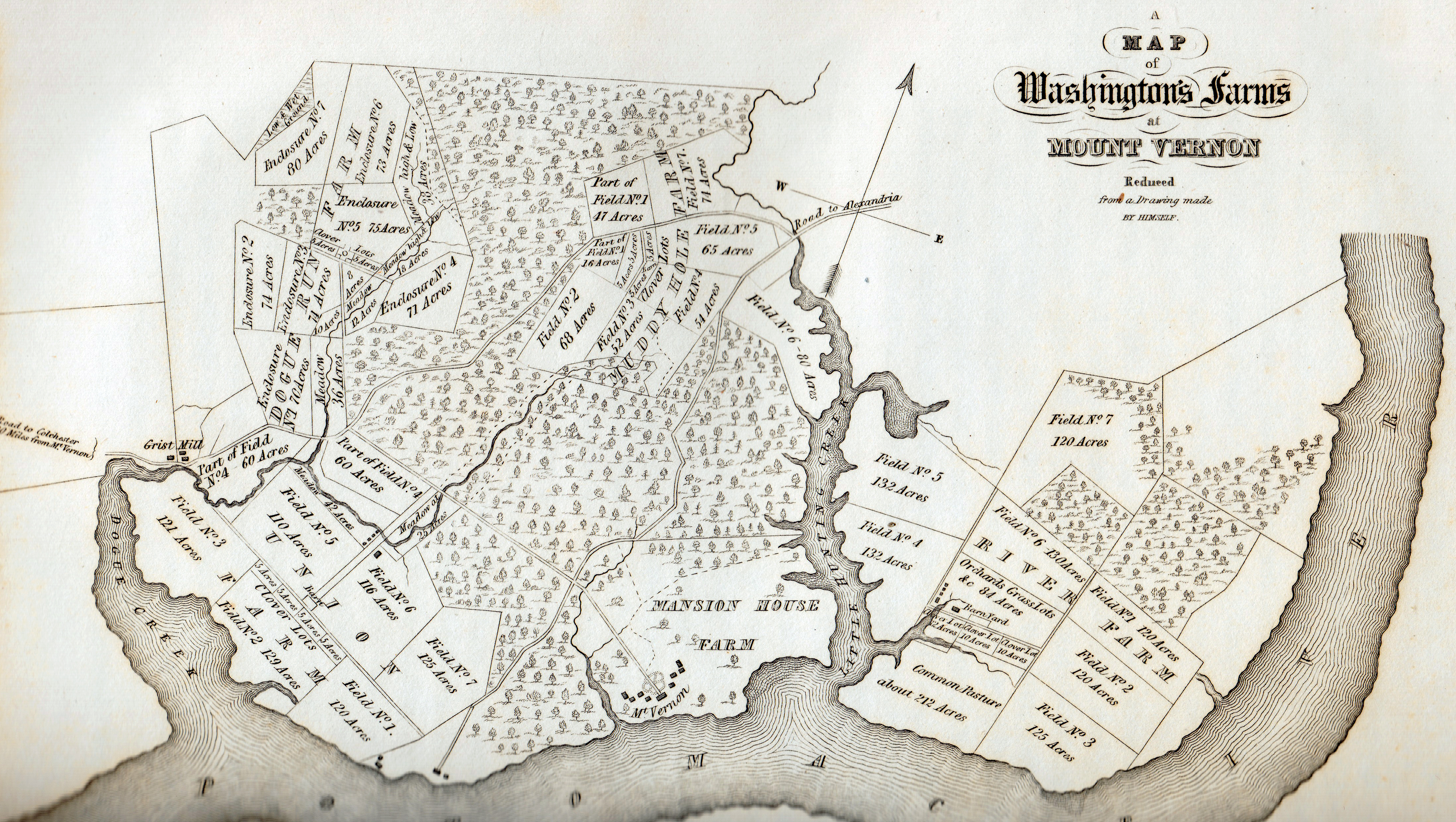
1830 engraving of a map of Mount Vernon, General Washington's estate and mansion, that was originally drawn by Washington. Library of Congress Geography and Map Division Washington, D.C.

There were 316 enslaved people living on Mount Vernon when George Washington died in 1799. About half were owned by the late President but most were inherited by Martha Washington's then-underage children after the death of their father (her first husband, Daniel Parke Custis). Of Martha's children by her first husband, two died before reaching adulthood, and two died as young adults, leaving a total of four grandchildren to inherit Daniel Parke Custis' estate when they came of age. Although Washington intended to free the people he enslaved upon his death, his will immediately freed only his personal manservant, William Lee, and left the rest to his widow, Martha, with orders that they be emancipated upon her death, when the "dower slaves" completely became property of her grandchildren. Afraid that she would come to harm, and after consulting with Bushrod Washington (whom the late President had designated as one of the executors of his will, as well as beneficiary of the core Mount Vernon plantation), Martha freed the slaves which she fully owned on New Year's Day in 1801. The remaining slaves who came with Martha (and had not already been given as dowries when some of her granddaughters married) were then divided up among those four grandchildren upon her death in 1802, pursuant to Daniel Parke Custis' will. Some of these enslaved people stayed at Mount Vernon, and others went to other estates.

Sarah's ancestors were slaves brought to Mount Vernon by heirs to that plantation. Bushrod Washington, George's nephew, became one of the executors of George's will, as well as inherited the Mount Vernon estate after Martha's death. While freeing his uncle's slaves as required of him as executor, beginning in 1802 he also brought slaves he had inherited following the deaths of his own father and mother. Thus, both enslaved and freed Blacks and mulattoes lived on the estate. Insubordination ensued after Bushrod told all the slaves that he had no intention of freeing them. In 1821 he sold fifty-four enslaved people (mostly from the "Union Farm" part of the estate) to Horatio S. Sprigg (1783–1847) and Archibald P. Williams (1788–1846) for $10,000, (~$313,700 in 2024) supposedly to work on their Louisiana plantations on Bayou Robert on the Red River. However, the large coffle (of about 100 slaves taken from the Alexandria slave jail) was spotted walking westward through in Leesburg, Virginia on August 21. This caused considerable controversy when Hezekiah Niles repeated the story from the local Leesburg newspaper in his Niles Weekly Register, perhaps the country's most-read periodical. Bushrod Washington replied by publishing an article defending his right to sell his property in another Baltimore newspaper, and criticized Niles for visiting Mount Vernon and talking with its residents in his absence. Of his remaining slaves, some escaped. Ned and George, sons of Oliver Smith, Bushrod's lifelong personal manservant, escaped in early October, then were recaptured but not sold, following their father's pleas. On December 3, another of George Washington's executors, Lawrence Lewis, who was also a local justice of the peace, ordered their sister Hannah arrested and held in jail for trial. On January 21, 1822, she was convicted of trying to poison his Union Farm overseer on August 27. Her husband, Hezekiah Scott, some of whose relatives had been in the coffle, had initially been arrested, but was released when the white overseer and his wife (who had prepared the coffee Hannah served, which proved arsenic tainted) failed to appear for the trial. She was sentenced to death, although that sentence was postponed a year by one governor, then reduced to transportation out of Virginia (after the state compensated Bushrod). While jailed in Fairfax, Hannah Smith Scott conceived and gave birth to a boy. She died of disease while incarcerated in Richmond on December 10, 1823. Virginia legislators debated what to do with the infant boy, deciding against the proposal of Fairfax delegate Robert Townshend Thompson to free him. The legislators ultimately decided he was Bushrod Washington's property, although his fate remains unknown (and given the high rate of infant mortality in that era, he probably died).

In 1829, Bushrod Washington and his wife (who were childless) died. Pursuant to Bushrod Washington's will, his nephew, John Augustine Washington II, inherited Mount Vernon (having previously inherited from his father a plantation he developed and called "Blakeley" in what became West Virginia in Sarah's lifetime). However, J.A. Washington II died within three years. He left the administration of both his estates to his widow, Jane Charlotte Blackburn Washington. Sarah's mother Hannah Parker was born around 1826 at Blakeley, and raised there, although Jane Charlotte Washington frequently transferred slaves between the plantations, as well as herself undertook the two-day carriage ride between them. In 1841, Jane Charlotte Washington decided to make Blakeley her residence and leased Mount Vernon and slaves to her eldest son, John Augustine Washington III (usually called by his middle name, Augustine). He had graduated from the University of Virginia that year and became the first Washington to personally manage Mount Vernon since the late President. Augustine Washington brought Hannah Parker and number of other farmhands or potential workers to Mount Vernon, and increased cultivated acreage (which had dwindled to only 145 acres), doubling it within five years and trebling it in 10 years. He also leased out slaves, including Hannah Parker. Augustine Washington became Mount Vernon's owner in full in 1855, when his mother died. Like his mother, he unsuccessfully tried to sell it to the Commonwealth of Virginia as well as to the federal government. By this time, Mount Vernon showed considerable wear and tear caused by a constant stream of sightseers, as well as unfavorable plantation economics. Eventually Augustine Washington moved his family and some slaves to another plantation, Waveland, west in Fauquier County.

The Mount Vernon Ladies' Association purchased part of Mount Vernon in 1859 (Note: The Mount Vernon Ladies' Association signed a contract in 1858 to buy Mount Vernon, raised the capital through 1869, and took possession in 1860.) to preserve the plantation, particularly in the events leading up to and during the Civil War. Black people who tended and cared for Mount Vernon also sought to preserve the estate, but foremost focused on self-preservation, where they would attain the freedom to buy their own property, make their own livings as they chose, and plan for their futures. When Mount Vernon was opened for visitors, there was an expectation of the way in which blacks would carry themselves, though, as faithful "old time Negroes", which required them to act subserviently. African Americans performed a wide range of jobs on the plantation, such as cooks, servants, and farm hands. Johnson's uncle, Edmund Parker, was the last of her family to be guardian of George Washington's tomb, as Oliver Smith had been during his lifetime decades earlier, and West Ford during his lifetime, and other elderly black men at other times, each reciting the script including the fudged "belonged to the family" as their own origin.

== Early and personal life ==
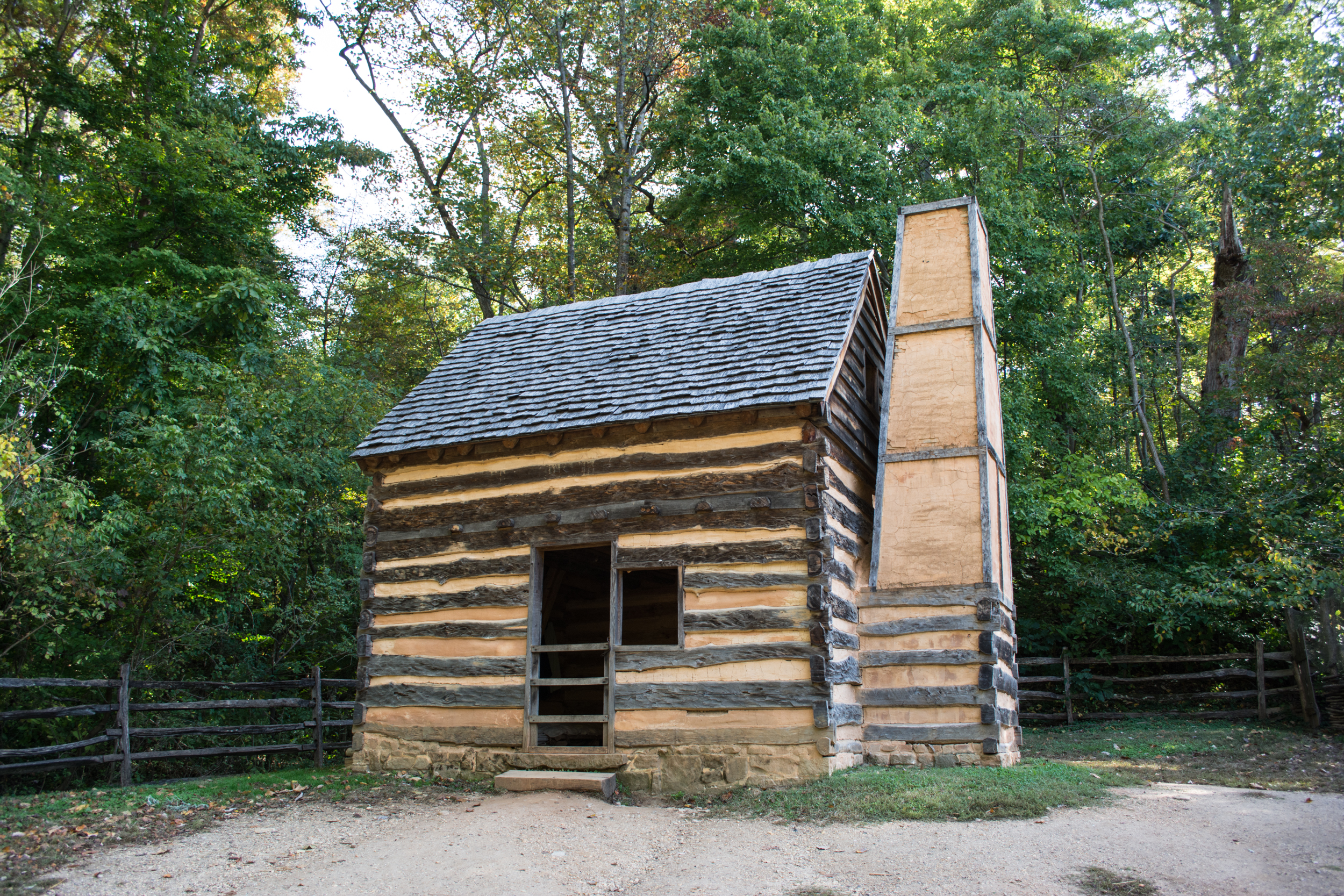
Slave cabin, Mount Vernon

Sarah Johnson was born on September 29, 1844, to Hannah Parker, an enslaved teenager who was owned by Jane Charlotte Washington, but sent to Mount Vernon, which was managed by her son Augustine Washington, who would ultimately sell the property to the Mount Vernon Ladies' Association in Sarah's lifetime Augustine Washington, who paid for the black midwife who assisted at the birth, had the previous year leased out Hannah to his cousin Charles Augustine Washington, who had moved from Jefferson County to Fairfax County. He operated and lived at a plantation he called "Wellington" near Mount Vernon. C.A. Washington would sell Wellington plantation in 1858 and move westward back to Frederick County, where he lived with his father and at least one brother (as well as enslaved people) until his death in 1861, but never married. About two years before Sarah's birth in 1842 (and before that lease), Hannah had given birth to a son, Isaac, and about two years after Sarah's birth, her mother married Warner May, whom Augustine purchased from a Jefferson County estate. The couple would have five more children together. Thus, although Sarah's father's name is unrecorded, she had several half-siblings.

Johnson was first married to Nathan Johnson, who was enslaved at Mount Vernon. They had a son, Smith, who was born in 1861. On October 25, 1888, Johnson was married a second time, to widower William Robinson, who was among the district's most substantial black landowners (having purchased a total of about fifty acres of Mason family land) and who would later also work part-time as a day laborer for the Mount Vernon Ladies Association. Their marriage license included the names of each of their mothers, but blank spaces for their fathers, an indication that both had been white. The pastor of Alexandria's Alfred Street Baptist Church officiated at the simple ceremony at Johnson's house at Mount Vernon, and a reception followed. The Vice Regent of Illinois, Mary Carver Leiter (1885–1913), purchased Sarah's simple yellow dress (and the wedding was postponed several times before it arrived). (Note: The invitation to the marriage of Sarah Johnson was in a scrapbook of Margaret Sweat, Vice Regent for Maine (1866–1908).)

== Mount Vernon ==
Johnson was a housekeeper and caretaker at Mount Vernon for more than 50 years. She lived there first as an enslaved girl and was later emancipated.

The Mount Vernon Ladies' Association hired Johnson after the Civil War to perform domestic chores, keep the house, and sell lunches to visitors. She was held in high esteem by her fellow workers and the Vice Regents and was known for historical knowledge "of nearly every piece of furniture in the mansion".

She and her husband Nathan operated a lunchroom that served tradesmen who boarded at Mount Vernon. She earned sixty cents a day per person. She also sold a book about the history of the estate by Benson Lossing and authorized guidebooks, for three to five cents. She became a Mount Vernon Ladies' Association council member after forty years at Mount Vernon. In 1889, she purchased a triangular four-acre piece of land and farmhouse in the middle of the Mount Vernon acreage for $350 (~$12,542 in 2025). The prime real estate was on a proposed railroad route to Alexandria, so later part was condemned for Fairfax county to construct a road, and other parcels were sold during the next three decades after financial reverses in her old age. (Note: Mount Vernon Magazine states that in 1889 she "purchased four acres of her own land just north of Mount Vernon, a plot formerly owned by John Augustine Washington III.")

== Death and legacy ==
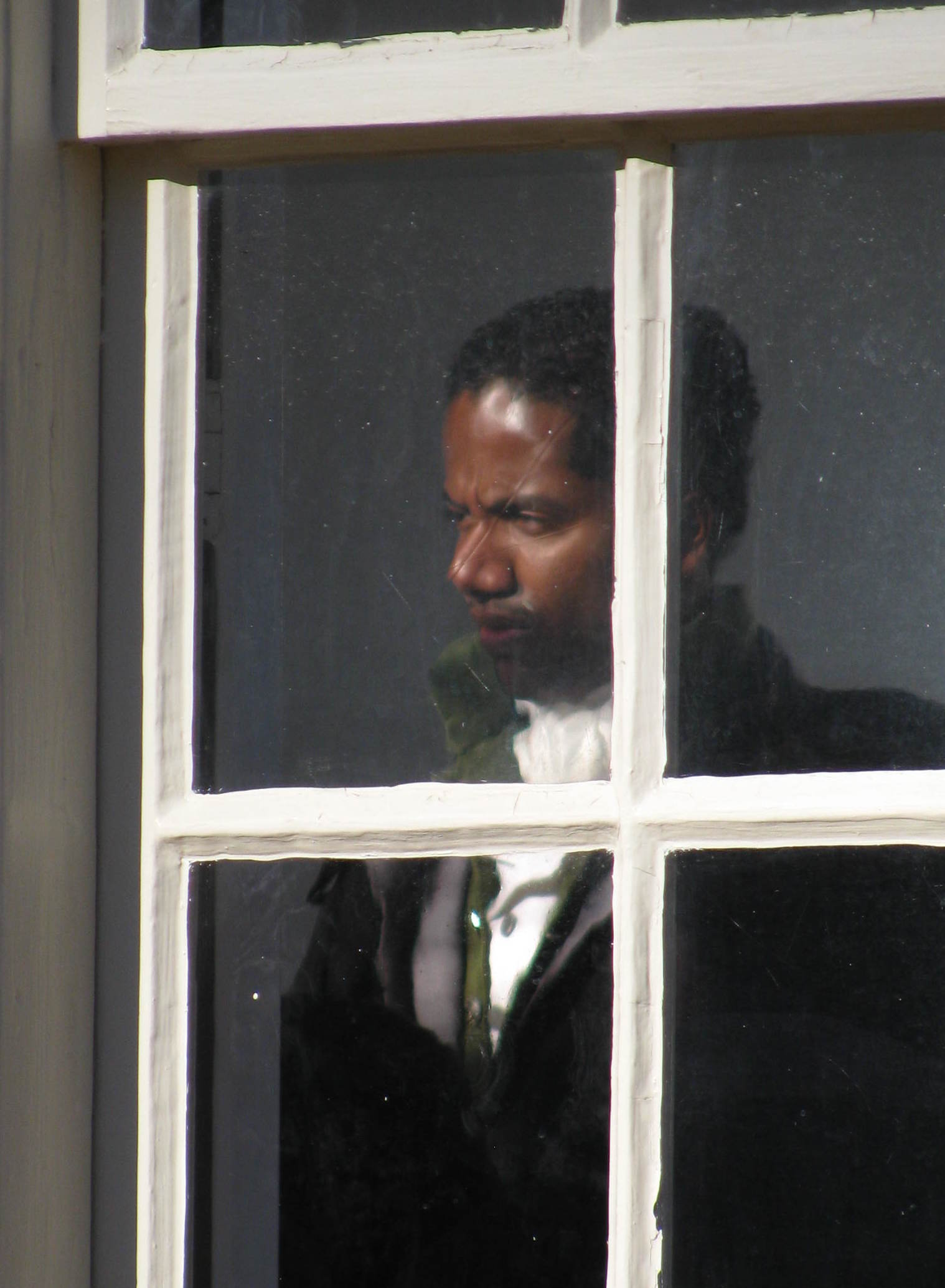
Mount Vernon reenactor at the greenhouse window

Sarah Johnson died at the Freedman's Hospital in Washington, D.C., on January 25, 1920. Mount Vernon flew its flag at half-mast in her memory.

Nearly a century after her death, historian Scott E. Casper wrote a book about her life, and those of other enslaved people after the late President's death, entitled Sarah Johnson's Mount Vernon. The book uses court records, correspondence, newspapers, and ledgers in order to tell the stories of African Americans who lived and worked at Mount Vernon during and after slavery, as influenced by Secession, the Civil War, Emancipation, the Reconstruction era, and Jim Crow laws. Thus it addresses the dichotomy between the founding of the country, with George Washington as its first president, with its noble intentions, and the enslavement and marginalization of black people. Erin Aubry Kaplan of the Los Angeles Times states in her review of the book: "Mount Vernon was a far more complicated place for black residents than for whites, because it represented three fundamentals that blacks were constantly trying to establish: work, home and a sense of national pride."

== See also ==
- List of enslaved people of Mount Vernon
- List of enslaved people
- George Washington and slavery
