= Edward Savage (artist) =

American painter (1761–1817)

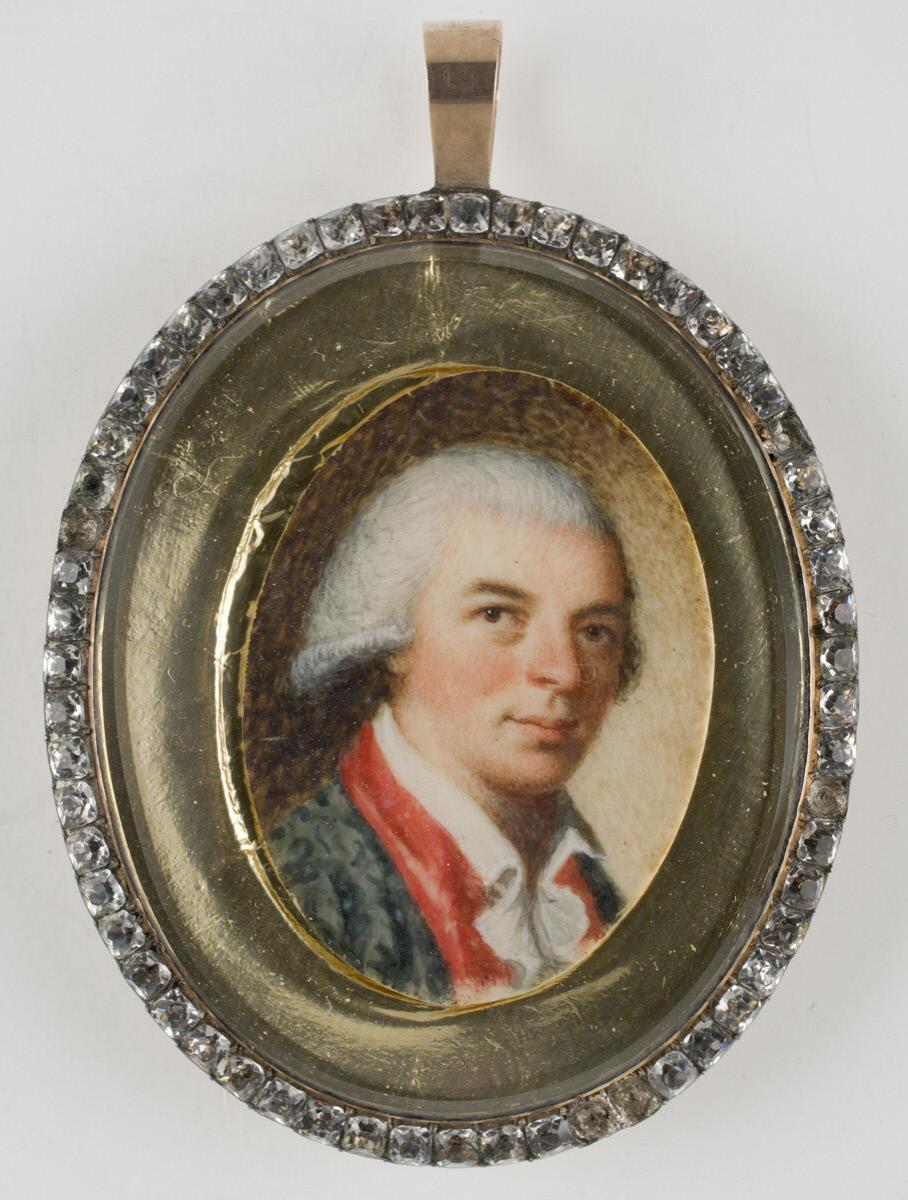
Self-portrait, c. 1791

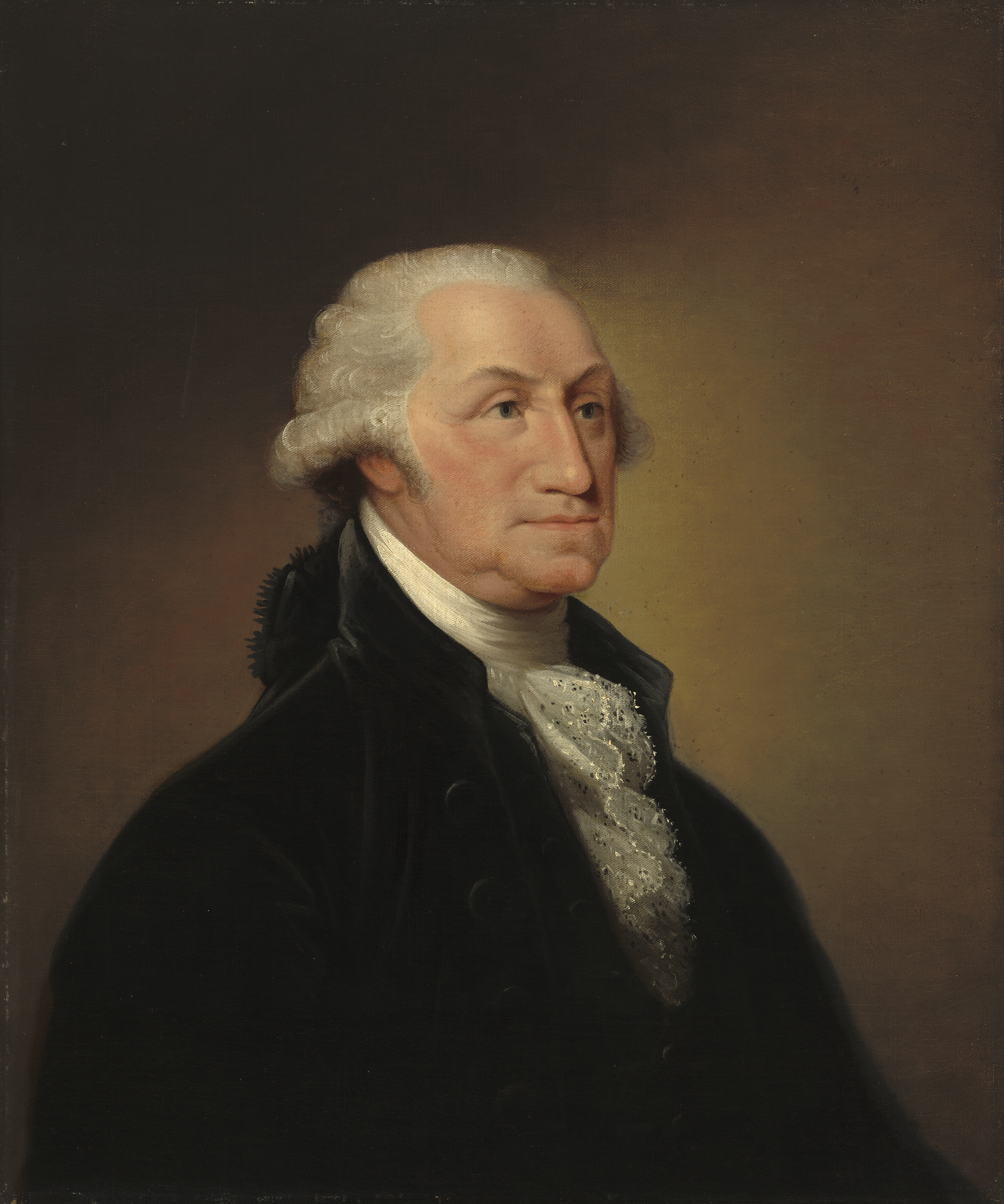
George Washington, c. 1796

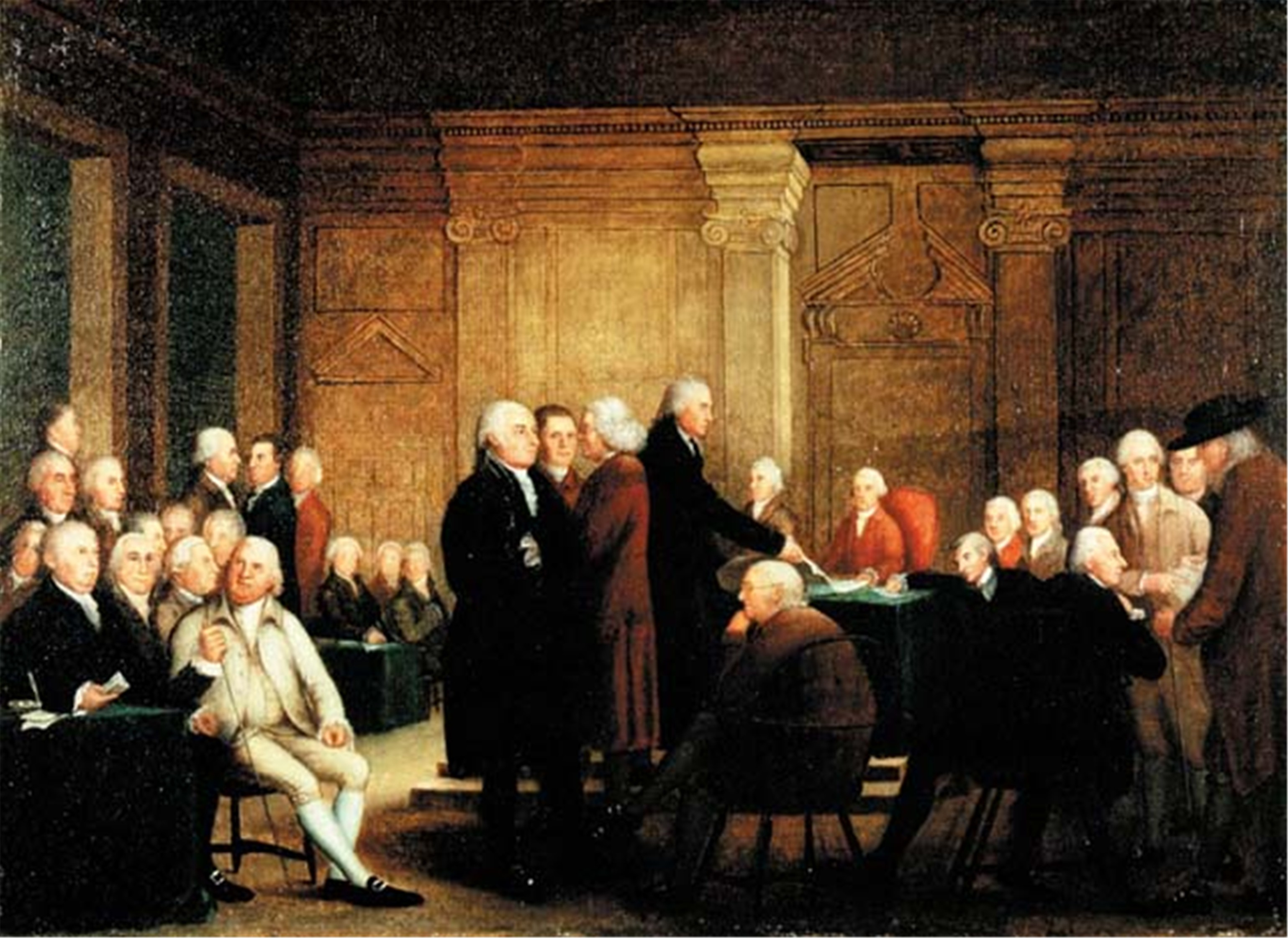
^{Atwater Kent Museum, Philadelphia} Congress Voting Independence (1784–1801)

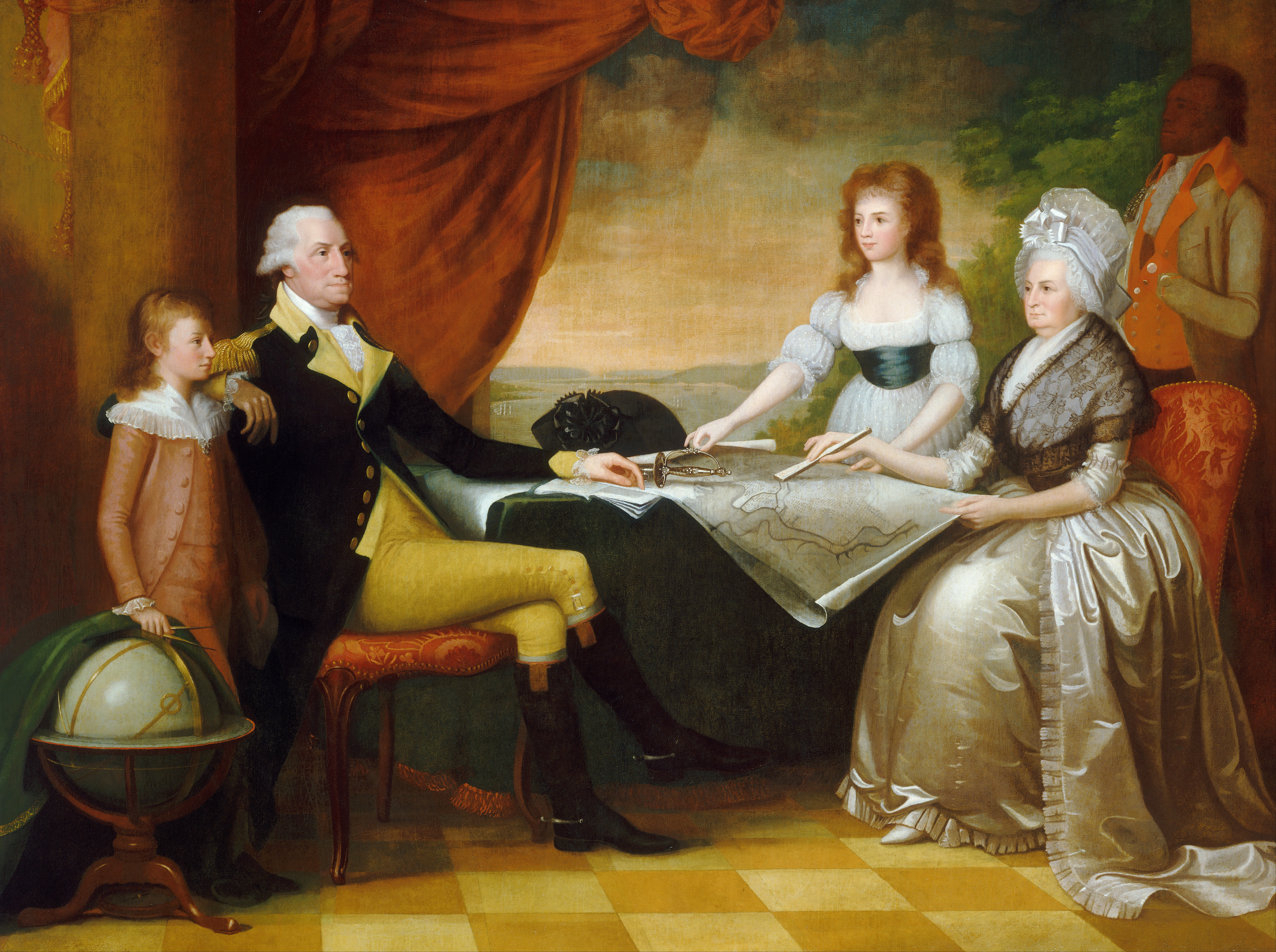
^{National Gallery of Art} The Washington Family (1789–96)

Edward Savage (November 26, 1761 – July 6, 1817) was an American portrait painter and engraver.

== Life and career ==
He was born in Princeton, Massachusetts, and at first worked as a goldsmith, also practicing engraving. Although seemingly untrained in painting, he came into prominence in 1790 through his portrait of George Washington, intended as a gift to Harvard University. In 1791 he visited London, where he studied for a time under Benjamin West, and then went to Italy. Upon his return to the United States in 1794, he practiced in Philadelphia and New York City, maintaining for several years a picture gallery and art museum on Water Street in New York.

Robert Edge Pine began the first representation of Congress Voting Independence (Historical Society of Pennsylvania Collection, Atwater Kent Museum, Philadelphia) in 1784, but it was unfinished at his death. Savage completed the painting in 1801, and mass-produced the image as a mezzotint. Its portraits of Anthony Wayne, Benjamin Rush, and Thomas Jefferson are highly esteemed. Savage is principally known, however, for a large portrait group, The Washington Family (begun 1789, completed 1796), portraying President George Washington, First Lady Martha Washington, two of her grandchildren, George Washington Parke Custis and Eleanor Parke Custis, and an enslaved servant, probably Christopher Sheels. The painting was in the collection formed by William F. Havemeyer, New York, until bought by Andrew Mellon and donated to the National Gallery of Art, Washington, DC. He died in Princeton.

== Publications ==
- C. H. Hart, in Proceedings of the Massachusetts Historical Society (Boston, 1905)

== Sources ==
- "Edward Savage". American Silversmiths.
