= Winney Grimshaw =

- Mount Airy
- U.S. National Register of Historic Places
- U.S. National Historic Landmark
- Virginia Landmarks Register
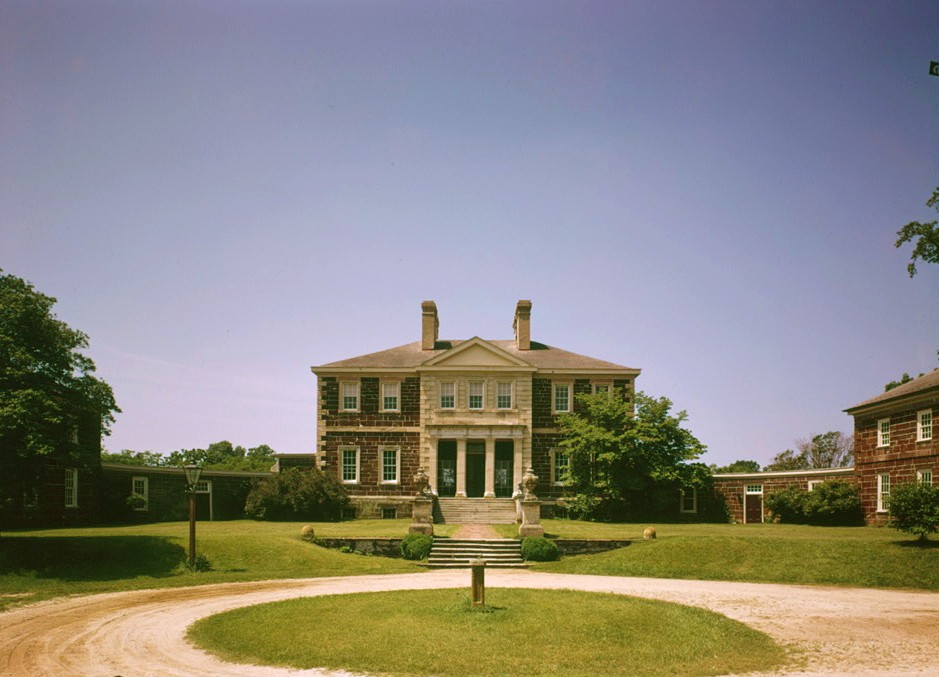
- Mount Airy in 1971
- Location: West of Warsaw on U.S. 360, Richmond County, Virginia
- Coordinates: 37°58′20″N 76°47′29″W
- Area: 450 acres (180 ha)
- Built: 1758–62
- Architect: John Ariss
- Architectural style: Neo-Palladian
- NRHP reference No.: 66000845
- VLR No.: 079-0013

Significant dates
- Added to NRHP: October 15, 1966
- Designated NHL: October 9, 1960
- Designated VLR: September 9, 1969

Winney Grimshaw (c. 1826 – ?) was an enslaved African-American woman at the Mount Airy Plantation in Richmond County, Virginia. The Grimshaws are one of the most well-documented enslaved families who lived at Mount Airy. Though the Grimshaws were a well-regarded enslaved family at Mount Airy, their enslaver still dissolved her family ties.

== Family and childhood ==
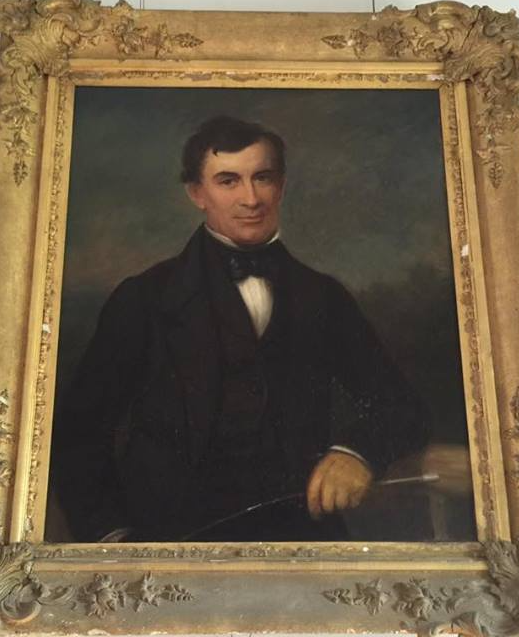
Portrait of William Henry Tayloe by Charles Bird King

Her parents were Esther Jackson and Bill Grimshaw, enslaved by William Henry Tayloe. Both were valuable to Mount Airy, as Esther was a spinner. Bill served as Tayloe's head carpenter from 1832 to 1845. Bill worked on The Octagon House in Washington, D.C., the Tayloe's winter residence and later the temporary home of James Madison and his family for six months after the British burned the White House.

Mount Airy did not keep birth records, but Winney Grimshaw is listed on the inventory for the Old House on January 1, 1827, recorded as being one year old. Esther and Bill had seven children, Lizza (1824), Winney (1826), Anna (1827), Juliet (1829), James (1831), Charlotte (1834), and Henry (1837).

In 1830, at four years old, Grimshaw was sent to Washington, D.C., to live with her grandmother and namesake, Winney Jackson, who worked as Anne Tayloe's chambermaid. At age five, she returned to Mount Airy lived with her mother in the Old House, and her father lived a few miles away at the home quarter of Mount Airy. Grimshaw did not have an assigned job until 1839, when she was thirteen years old. Most enslaved children had been working for a few years by this age. Due to Esther's role as a spinner, she was often close to the household where Grimshaw spent much of her childhood.

In 1840, at fourteen, Grimshaw was sent out to her first job accompanied by her sisters – Anna, twelve years old, and Juliet, ten years old. They were lent to Mrs. William N. Ward, the wife of a local clergyman. She was expected to feed, clothe, and house the girls. This was an easy way for enslavers to train young enslaved girls as domestic workers.

Around 1841 or 1842, Winney returned to Mount Airy, living for the first time without her family's company. She lived in a farming quarter with forty other enslaved people, though her job was to tend to Mrs. Monday, the sickly wife of her white enslaver. A year later, in 1843, at seventeen years old, Winney Grimshaw was documented as a spinner, and in 1844 she married Jacob Carrington, who had worked in the plantation's gristmill since the age of nine. Jacob Carrington's father was unusual in that he was an emancipated African American, though this did not benefit Jacob, as the law of partus sequitur ventrem ruled that the title of slavery was passed down maternally. Together, Winney and Jacob lived in the home quarter, and in 1844, at eighteen years old, Grimshaw gave birth to her first son, John Carrington.

== Separation ==
In 1845, Bill Grimshaw ran away after being whipped as punishment for a disagreement with one of his white supervisors. He was the only enslaved person at Mount Airy between 1808 and 1860 to successfully escape slavery permanently. As retribution and to discourage other enslaved people on the plantation from seeking freedom, Tayloe broke up the Grimshaw family. Letters between Juliet and her older sister, Lizza, display the distress felt at the separation of their family. At nineteen, Grimshaw, her fourteen-year-old brother James, and her baby John, were all sent to the Oakland cotton plantation in Alabama. Virginia became a large exporter of enslaved labor in the United States after the Act Prohibiting Importation of Slaves took effect in 1808. William Henry Tayloe sent a total of 218 enslaved people from Mount Airy to Alabama between 1833 and 1862. Winney was a trained spinner, and James was training as a carpenter, so their usefulness on a cotton plantation was minimal, but their transfer was a threat to other people enslaved at Mount Airy. Plantation labor was much more strenuous than domestic labor, which was seen as a more favorable position. It is unknown the exact cause, but in 1847, during her time at the plantation, Grimshaw's son, John Carrington, died.

== Life in Alabama ==
During this time in Grimshaw's life, she witnessed and experienced her white enslavers' rape and sexual abuse of many enslaved women. (See for example the biographies of Alice Clifton, Jane the Runaway, Bridge Town, and Betty, George and Martha Washington's enslaved seamstress.) Scholars have found that many enslaved women's most intimate lives were closely managed and dictated by their enslavers. With her husband remaining at Mount Airy, in 1849, Winney Grimshaw bore her supervisor Richard Donnahan's son, naming him John after her late infant. Grimshaw is documented as his Black mistress throughout his family correspondence. In 1850, a second child was born, Julia, who died as a young baby. In 1853, Grimshaw gave birth to another baby girl, Lizza. Both babies shared namesakes with their aunts, Winney's sisters Juliet and Lizza, which demonstrates the importance of family ties even after being transferred to the plantation.

After the birth of Lizza, William Henry Tayloe attempted to break up the relationship between Grimshaw and Donnahan by first encouraging Donnahan to manage a different plantation miles away. When this did not work, Tayloe focused on Grimshaw instead, giving her four-year-old son John as a New Year's gift to his niece, Lucy Tayloe, who documented the exchange with a "Thank You" letter. This did not end the relationship between Donnahan and Grimshaw, and in 1855 Willie Anne was born, followed by William Henry. Because Tayloe controlled the reproductive rights of the women he enslaved, any of Grimshaw's children became his property. It was unusual that Tayloe disapproved of her children with Donnahan, as slave breeding could increase his profits. The remainder of Grimshaw's children stayed with her, and in 1858 Tayloe dismissed Donnahan, separating the white supervisor from Grimshaw. In 1861, Grimshaw was documented as a housekeeper on the Larkin plantation for her overseer, John W. Ramey. In 1862, Grimshaw gave birth to another baby, Thorton, fathered by Ramey. This created tensions between Mrs. Ramey and her husband and Ramey and Tayloe. In November 1865, Grimshaw is listed again at the Larkin plantation with five children, suggesting that she had given birth to yet another baby.

Shortly after the beginning of the American Civil War, Tayloe moved many of his enslaved workers on Mount Airy to Alabama. Many families that had been separated were given the chance to reunite; however, Grimshaw's husband, Jacob Carrington, had determined that freedom was more important than returning to his wife. He left Mount Airy in December 1861; Richard Dunn claims that he "deserted to the Yankee army" when he found out about Tayloe's plan to move. Carrington's decision demonstrates the difficult choice many enslaved women and men had to make between family and freedom, like that of Winney's father, Bill.

== Later years ==
Though the Grimshaw family is considered well-documented, other than the mention of the births of Winney Grimshaw's children, her documentation is sparse. She is listed as a domestic worker at the Oakland plantation between the ages of 19 and 28, then at the Woodlawn plantation between the ages of 29 and 32, and the Larkin plantation from ages 33 to 40. All three plantations were located in Alabama and were owned by William Henry Tayloe. Winney Grimshaw's name appears for the last time at the Larkin plantation in 1866. Tayloe, reflecting on his time as an enslaver, mentions Winney's name for the last time in 1868, saying, "Winney Grimshaw could fill a volume with interesting events, if [she] could write." Neither Grimshaw nor her children are listed on the 1870 United States census.
