= Louisa Parke Costin =

- Born: Washington, D.C., US
- Died: Washington, D.C., US
- Occupation: School teacher
- Parent(s): William Costin and Philadelphia Judge Costin
- Relatives: John Dandridge (paternal grandfather), Ann Dandridge-Costin (paternal grandmother), Martha Washington (paternal aunt), Betty (maternal grandmother), Oney Judge (maternal aunt)

Louisa Parke Costin (c. 1804 – October 31, 1831) established a school for African American children in 1823. Located on Capitol Hill in Washington, D.C., it was known as the first public school for black children in the city.

She was related to Martha Washington through her father John Dandridge, who was Costin's paternal grandfather. Martha Washington was her mother's slaveholder. When Washington died, her granddaughter Elizabeth Parke Custis Law inherited Delphy. Two years later, Delphy and her daughters Louisa and Ann were manumitted by Elizabeth and her husband Thomas Law.

== Early life ==
Louisa Parke Costin was born c. 1804, the daughter of William Costin and Philadelphia (née Delphy) Judge of Washington, D.C. Her parents were cousins, both born at Mount Vernon in 1780. William Costin's mother, Ann Dandridge, was of Cherokee and African American descent and her father was John Dandridge, the father of Martha Dandridge Custis Washington. After William's birth, Ann married an enslaved man at Mount Vernon with the Costin surname.

William Costin was a messenger for the Bank of Washington. Philadelphia Delphy was an enslaved spinner at Mansion House Farm at Mount Vernon. She was the younger sister of Ona Judge, Martha Washington's personal maid, who escaped in 1796. Costin and Judge were married in 1800 and they moved to Washington, D.C. immediately after Martha Washington's death.

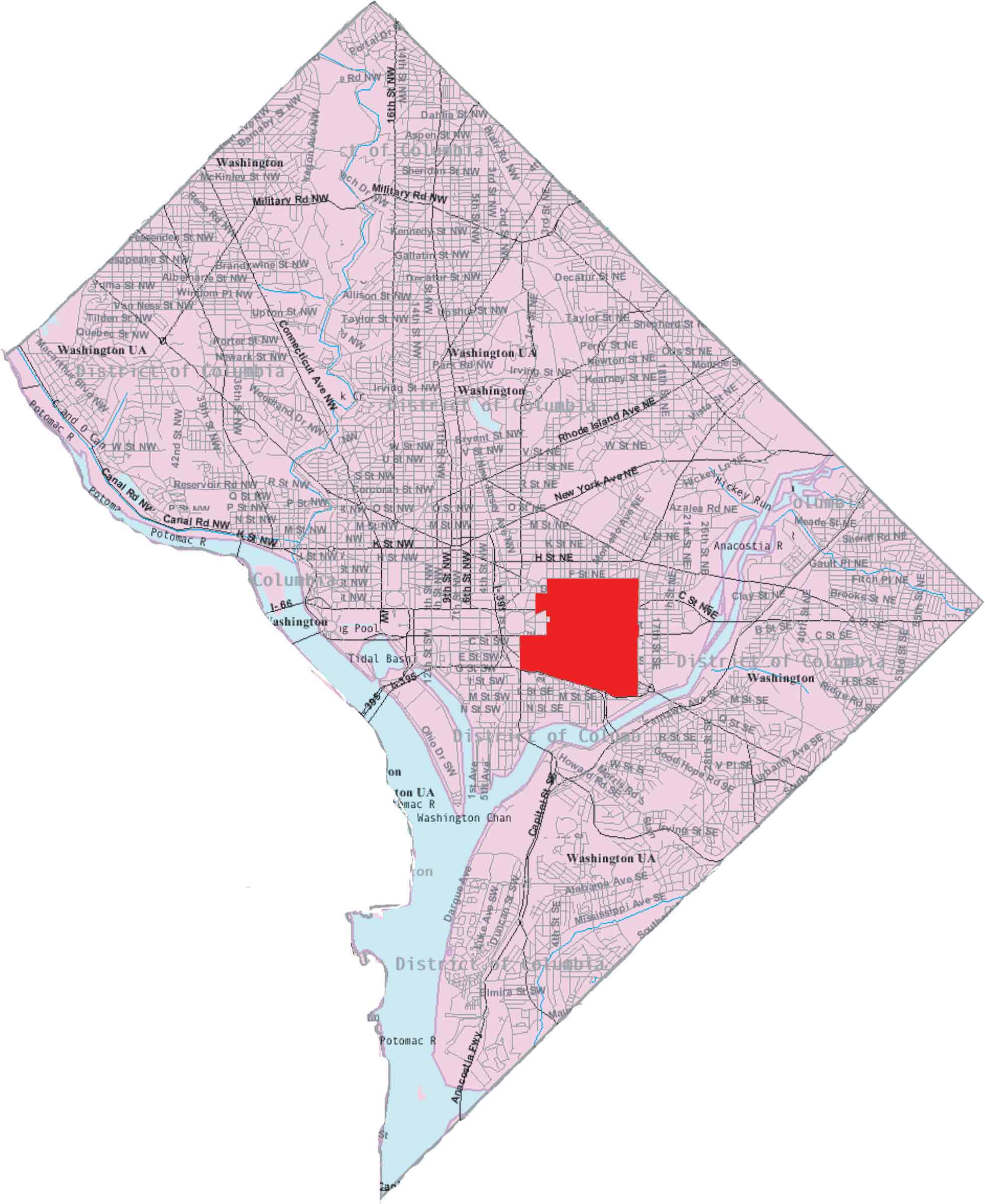
Capitol Hill, Washington, D.C.

When Martha Washington died, she left Delphy to her granddaughter Elizabeth Parke Custis Law. In 1807, Delphy and her two daughters Louisa and Ann were freed by Law's husband Thomas.

All future children of the couple were born free. Louisa had six siblings, all of whom were educated with white children in Capitol Hill. Martha and Frances, the two younger daughters, completed their education in Baltimore at the Colored Convent. The family lived in a house on A Street in Capitol Hill that William had built in 1812. The Costins also took in four orphaned children.

== Career ==
Although Washington, D.C. was a city of the South, schools were established to educate enslaved and free children. The first school in the city for African American children (called The Bell School) was established by Moses Liverpool, George Bell, and Nicholas Franklin. All three were freed slaves who could not read or write. They hired a teacher for the school. Other pioneers for schools for African Americans included Maria Becraft, John F. Cook, Laura Parke Costin, and Mary Wormley.

In an article about the history of colored public schools in Georgetown and Washington, D.C., recognizing specific pioneers including Costin, Professor Frederick A. P. Barnard states:

That the struggle of the colored people of the District of Columbia in securing for themselves the means of education furnishes a very instructive chapter in the history of schools. Their courage and resolution were such, in the midst of their own great ignorance and strenuous opposition from without, that a permanent record becomes an act of justice to them.

Costin established a school for African American children in her father's house on Capitol Hill in 1823. She operated the school until 1831, when she died. Her mother also died that year. Her sister Martha opened the school again in 1832 after she had completed her education at a convent school in Baltimore. She operated the school until 1839. Throughout its operation, the school was always full.

== See also ==
- Alethia Tanner
