= Smothers School House =

Coordinates: 38.900°N 77.032°W

Information
- Other name: Columbian Institute
- Established: 1823
- Founder: Henry Smothers
- Closed: 1862
- Enrollment: c.100

Smothers School House was a school for African American students in Washington, D.C. It was located at 14th and H Streets, NW, just a few blocks from the White House, from about 1823—1862. The building was constructed in 1822—23 by Henry Smothers, a free black man who lived in Georgetown. He was the first teacher.

The school had more than 100 students, making it larger than the several other city schools for African Americans. Smothers was the teacher for two years, then he was succeeded by John W. Prout in 1825. Prout appears to have called it the "Columbian Institute," perhaps because of a connection to the local learned society called the Columbian Institute for the Promotion of Arts and Sciences. Prout had an assistant teacher, Annie Marie Hall. Schooling was free to students, and funded by subscription supporters.

Prout was succeeded by John F. Cook, Sr. The school was no longer free then; it required tuition. The school and Mr. Cook were attacked in 1835, as many colored schools were in the Snow Riot. Mr. Cook "escaped the city" and returned to teach again in 1836, continuing to 1855.

The building changed hands several times. The Smothers Schoolhouse was used for schools run by the Society of Saint Vincent de Paul from 1858 to 1861. In 1862 it was burned down (or attacked again) and not reconstructed.

== Legacy ==
An elementary school on 44th Street was later named for Smothers. Another school was named for John F. Cook, Sr., whose son became a noted educator too.
