= Betty (slave) =

Enslaved woman owned by Martha Washington

Betty (c. 1738 – 1795) was a biracial woman who was enslaved by John Custis, and then by his son, Daniel Parke Custis, on the family's plantation in White House, Virginia. Daniel Parke Custis became the first husband of Martha Washington and was the father of her four children. He died in 1757.

When widow Martha Custis married George Washington in 1759, Betty and her young son Austin were brought to Mount Vernon. There Betty gave birth to four more children, including Oney Judge.

A year after Betty's 1795 death, Oney Judge successfully escaped to freedom from the Washingtons.

== Early life ==
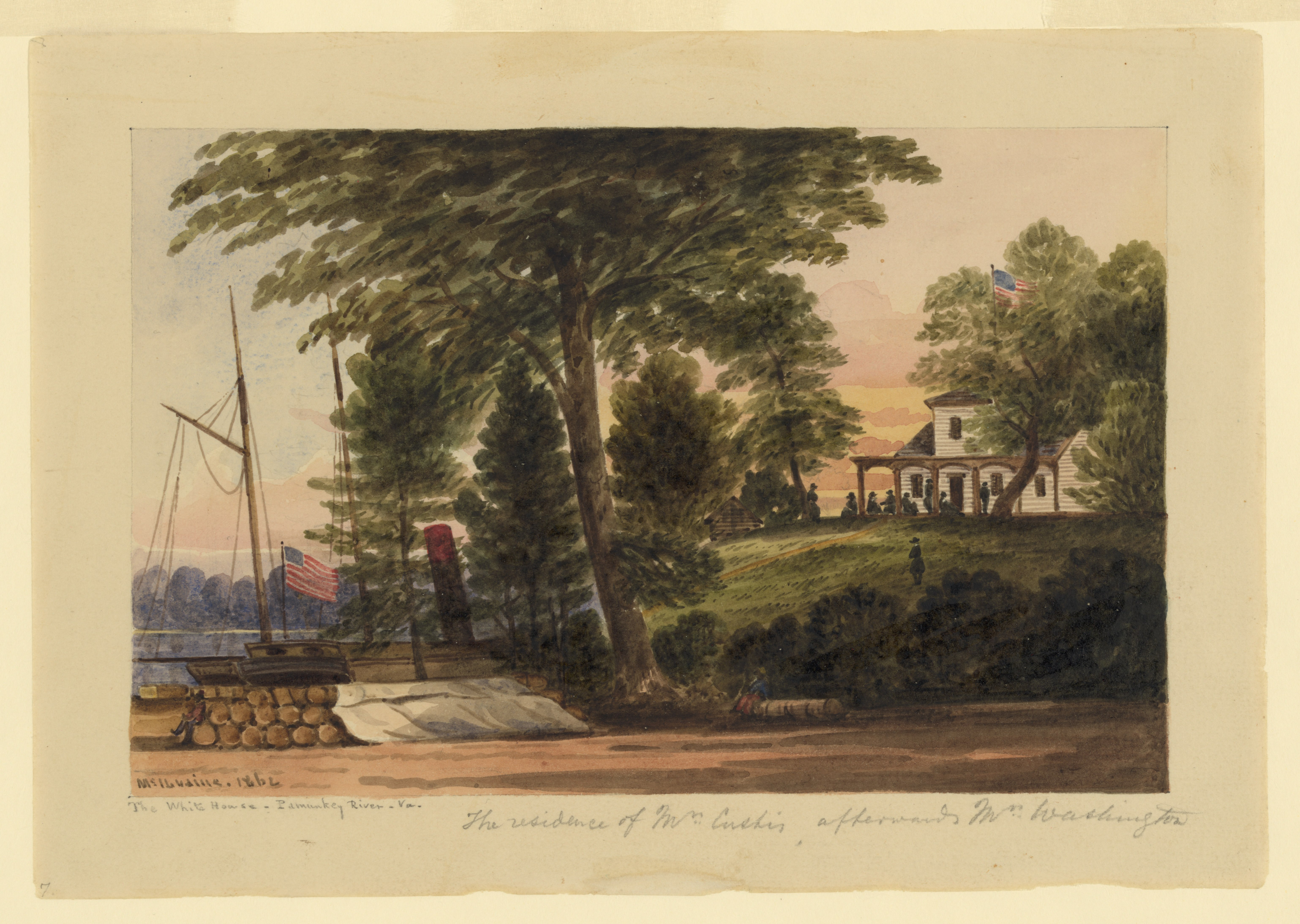
White House Plantation, in an 1862 watercolor by William McIlvaine

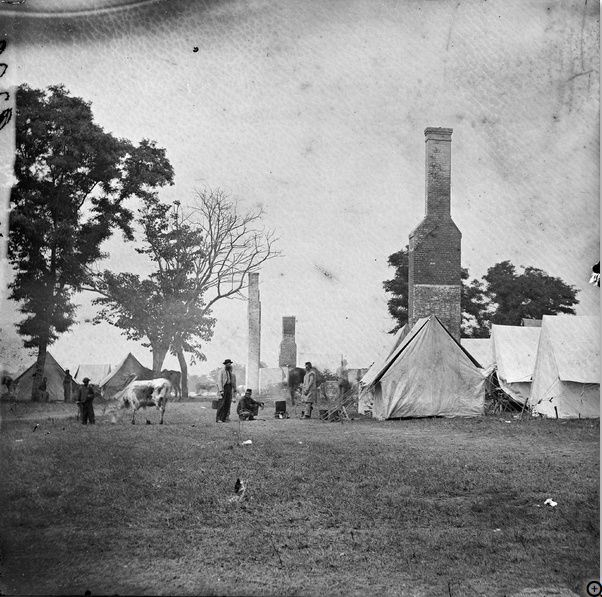
Retreating Union troops burned White House Plantation on June 28, 1862. Photograph by Mathew Brady.

Betty may have been born on the Custis plantation "White House," on the Pamunkey River in New Kent County, Virginia. Daniel Parke Custis inherited "White House" from his father in 1749, and married Martha Dandridge in 1750. They lived at "White House," where she bore him four children.

Because Daniel Parke Custis died without a will, his widow was granted a "dower share" of his Estate—the lifetime use of one third of its assets. This third included approximately 85 slaves of African descent—who were held in trust for the Custis children (and later grandchildren). The January 6, 1759 wedding of Martha Dandridge Custis and George Washington took place at "White House." As one of the "dower slaves", Betty was then brought to Mount Vernon, where she worked for the rest of her life.

Betty worked as a seamstress both at the White House and Mount Vernon plantations. Her story exemplifies the sexual vulnerability that enslaved women faced. Betty was of mixed European and African heritage. Since Betty was born enslaved, her mother would have been of African descent as slavery was inherited through the mother per the law of partus sequitur ventrem. As Betty's mother had a child with a white man, her mother was most likely a slave in the domestic sphere, as that occupation would have caused Betty's mother to be in close proximity to white men.

Betty was born c. 1738 and spent her childhood cared for by someone besides her mother as enslaved parents worked sunup to sundown and only had time with their children at night. Enslaved children younger than twelve did not work with their parents and did not yet have specified occupations. Instead, their owners had them do chores, like collecting water and firewood, or taking care of younger enslaved children. Because enslaved children did not typically work as long as adults, they did not receive shoes or blankets, and were often forced to share blankets with their family members. Enslaved children were also given less than the normal food ration and often helped to grow gardens so their family could have more food than just the meager rations they were provided. As with many other slaves, Betty likely only had one set of clothes for the whole year. Children like Betty were given shifts to wear.

== Life at White House Plantation ==
By the time she was a pre-adolescent, around 11–14 years old, Betty trained to be a seamstress, a skilled occupation that gave her a higher status among the enslaved workforce at White House Plantation. Betty started work before sunrise and ended work after the sun went down. Slaves working in the domestic sphere, like seamstresses, were often biracial.

As a seamstress, Betty was not only tasked with making clothes for her master and his family, but also for other enslaved people on the plantation. The master's and his family's clothes would have been made with materials like silk, cotton, or anything that the master could afford, while slaves' clothes tended to be made from linen or wool, which were much cheaper materials. Betty would also have been tasked with repairing clothes of both the enslaved people and her master and his family.

As an enslaved domestic worker, Betty worked closely with Martha Custis (Washington) both at White House Plantation and at Mount Vernon. Betty was one of Martha's favorite slaves and while working at White House Plantation, "Betty watched... [Martha Washington] survive the sudden loss of her first husband" and the deaths of two of her four children. She also saw her meet and marry George Washington.

While working at White House Plantation, Betty gave birth to her first child, Austin, at the age of nineteen in 1757. Austin's father is unknown, but it is likely that his father was white, as Austin was reported to have lighter skin. Since lighter skin was favored for domestic occupations, Austin worked as a waiter for the Washingtons.

== Move to Mount Vernon ==
Daniel Parke Custis died in 1757, leaving Martha Custis a very rich widow. As part of Martha's widow dower share she received the lifetime use of 84 slaves from the Custis Estate. Scholar Erica Dunbar notes that the death of an owner would have made 21-year-old Betty nervous, as slaves were often sold and families separated in order to pay off any outstanding debts their owner may have had. Luckily for Betty, she and her two-year-old son, Austin, were not separated and Martha Washington picked both of them to go to Mount Vernon with her in 1759. At the time of Betty's and Austin's move to Mount Vernon, together the two of them were worth sixty pounds. Eventually a total of 155 slaves from the Custis estate were brought to Mount Vernon. Dunbar notes that Betty's anxieties would not have subsided with her move to the new Virginia plantation, as she was likely nervous about the sexual vulnerability she faced with her new owner. Dunbar writes that at 21, Betty was the perfect age for childbearing, and she did not know how Washington would treat her. It was never recorded that George Washington sexually abused any of his slaves, but Betty was still vulnerable to exploitation by other men at Mount Vernon, as well as at White House Plantation.

== Life at Mount Vernon ==
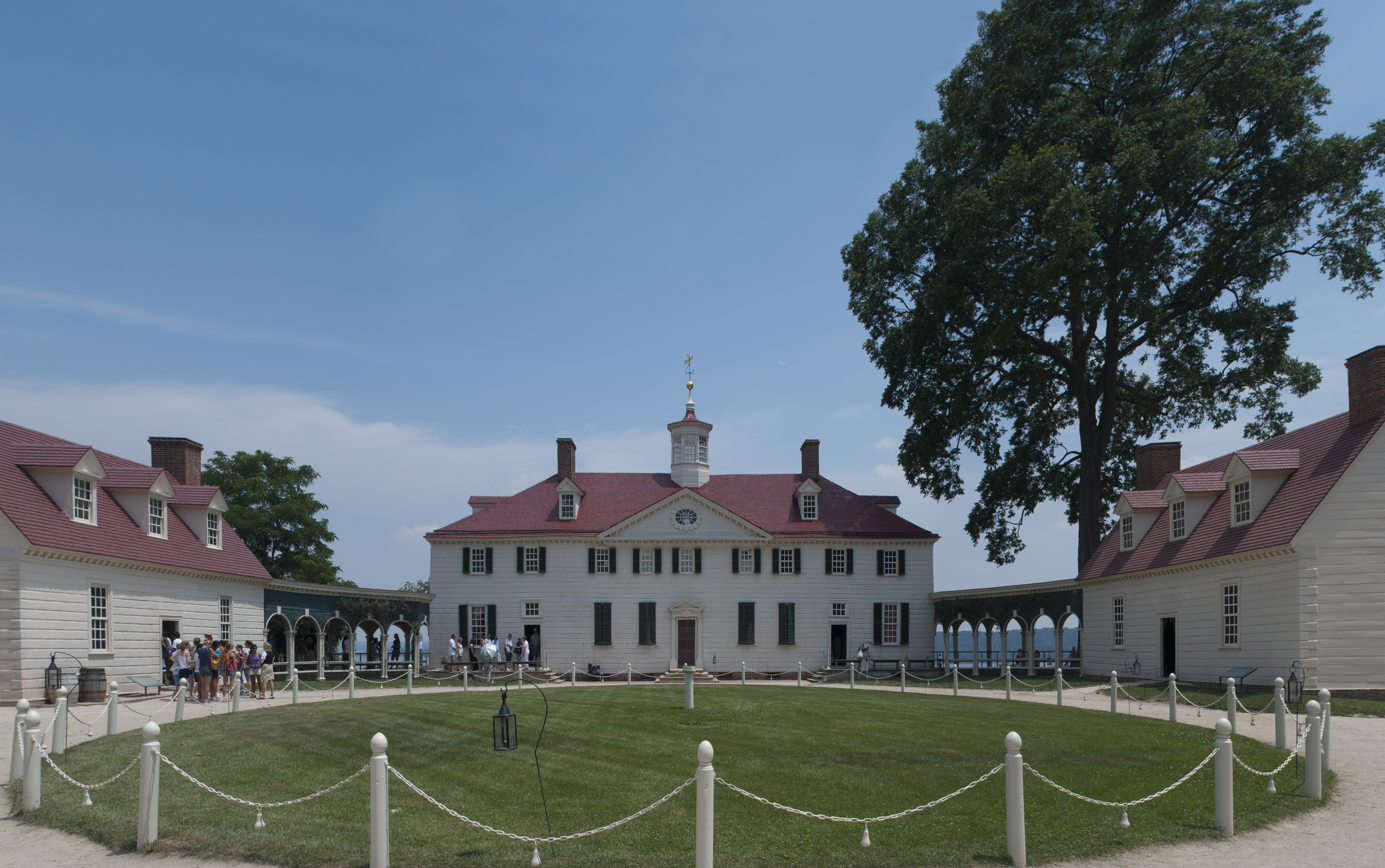
The Mansion House at Mount Vernon

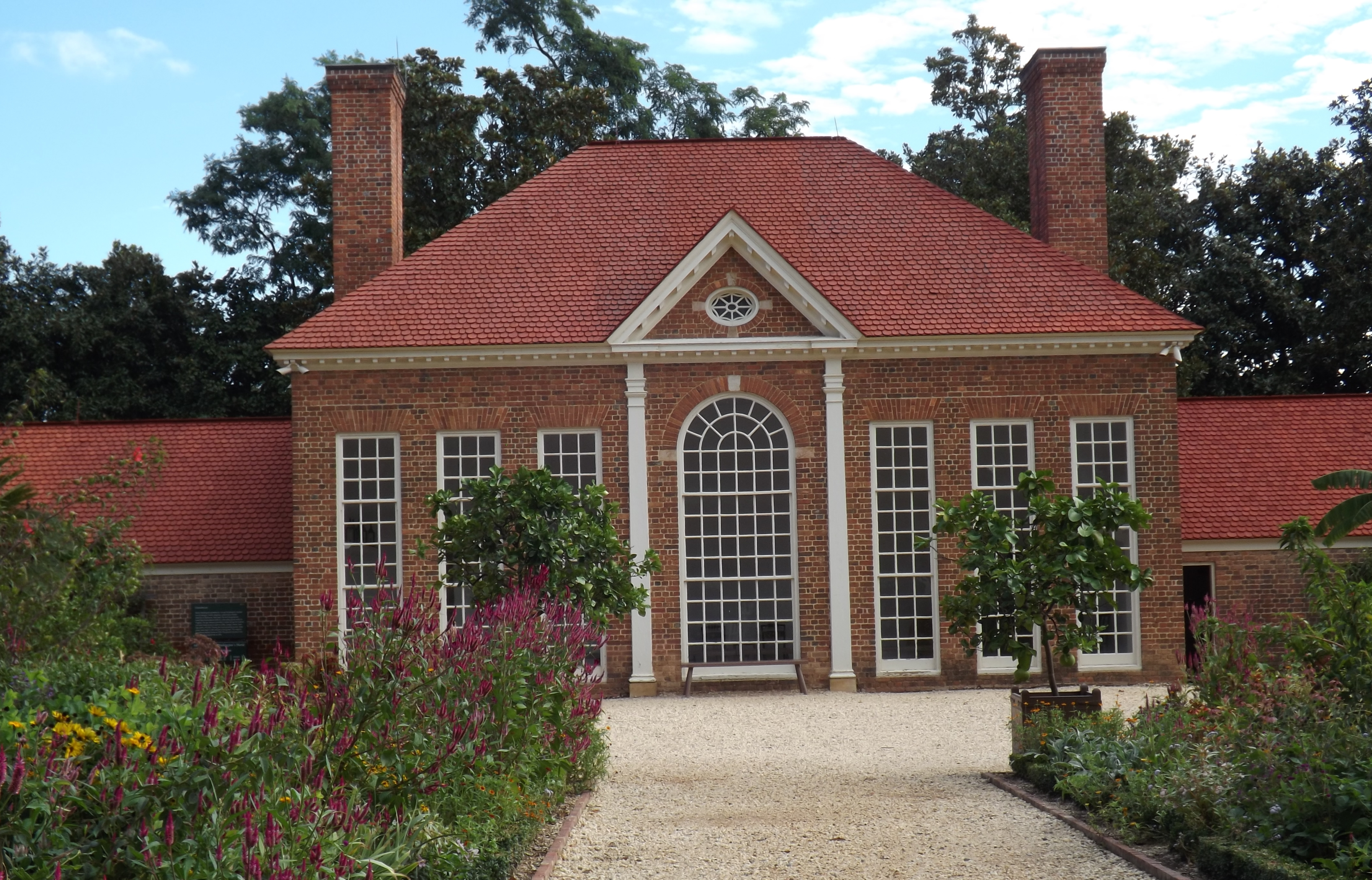
Greenhouse (built 1784-87, burned 1835, recreated 1951) at Mount Vernon. The one-story buildings attached to either side of the Greenhouse are re-creations of the barracks-style Mansion House slave quarters, built by Washington in 1793.

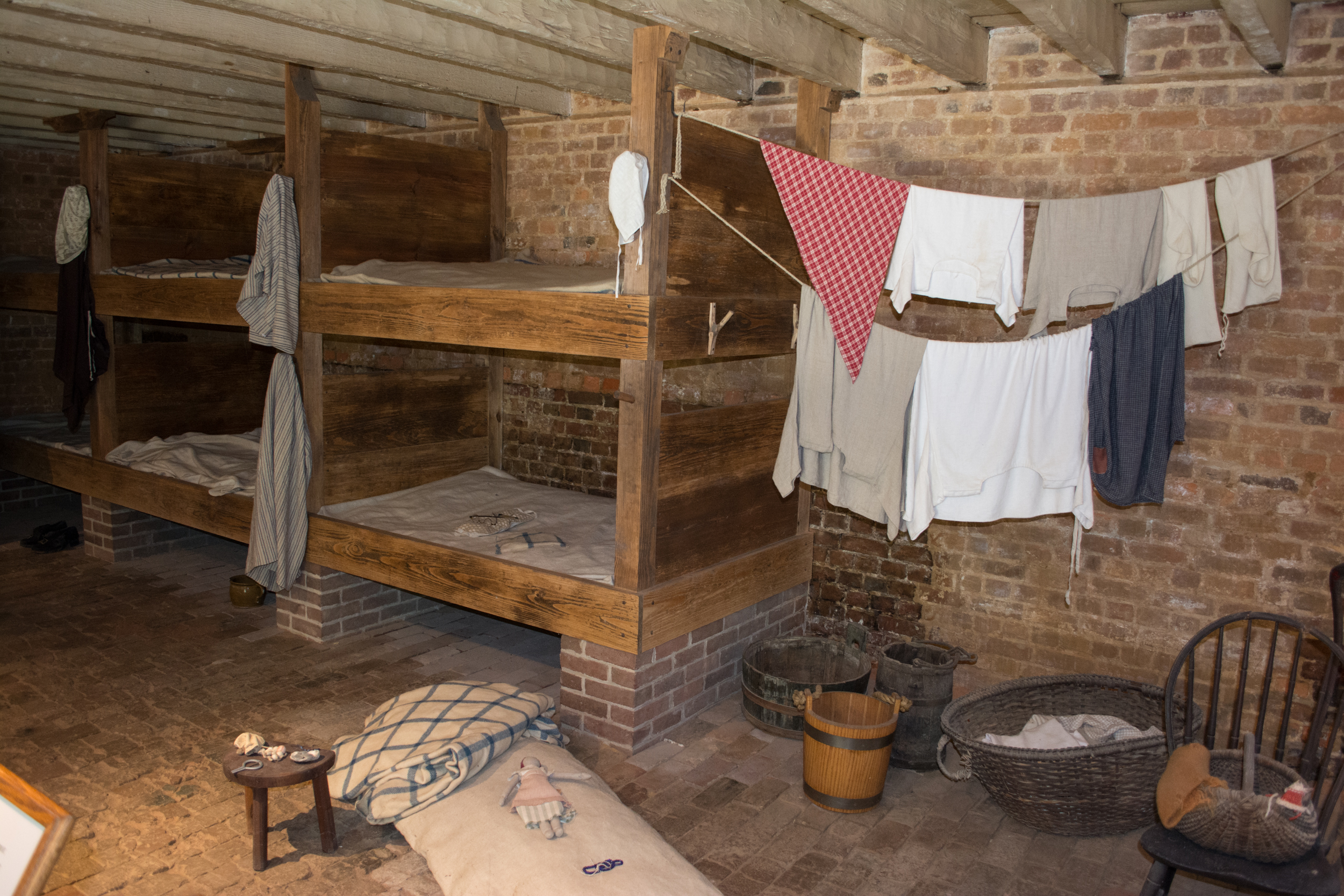
Recreated interior of the 1793 Mansion House slave quarters.

At Mount Vernon, Betty was part of the 6% mixed race (of mixed European and African descent) population at the plantation. Betty spent her entire day working primarily as a seamstress and spinner, but she also cooked and cleaned. Since Betty worked at the Mansion House, the domestic part of the estate, she was likely to be seen by visitors and so she was clothed better than her enslaved field working counterparts. Betty wore simple, ankle-length dresses that were made out of cheaper material, like linen or wool. Betty also had an apron, cap, stockings, and shoes.

Betty was tasked with making clothes for her owners as well as for other slaves. Each week, Betty had to make a certain percentage of clothes, according to the clothing ration Washington set for his enslaved people. If she failed to meet this ration, she would have been punished.

It is unclear where Betty initially lived at Mount Vernon. Domestic slaves were kept close to the Washingtons' home. By the early-1760s, George Washington had completed the two-and-a-half-story "House for Families," the predominant slave quarter for the Mansion House. It was built of brick, was two stories tall and had chimneys. Only skilled, domestic slaves lived at the "House for Families," "a substantial brick building that housed as many as sixty people in barracks-style conditions." This was located on "the north lane of outbuildings, directly across from the blacksmiths' shop." From archaeological evidence, it appears that slaves living at the "House for Families" cooked "one-pot meals" that consisted of low-grade meat and cornmeal, as well as any vegetables or fruits that they had grown in their gardens. Washington only provided his enslaved people rations of pork and cornmeal.

Following completion of the one-story slave quarters attached to either side of the Greenhouse, the "House of Families" was demolished in 1793, The new quarters consisted of four rooms totaling 2,800 square feet, and was built to house sixty people, fifteen people per room. Each room had a fireplace, numerous bunkbeds, and a door that was visible from Washington's bedroom. Washington built the new quarters so that he could keep a closer eye on his enslaved people.

The housing situation at Mount Vernon reveals a hierarchy, as slaves were housed according to their occupation. Skilled slaves tended to be housed in brick buildings at the Mansion House, while field workers were instead housed in log or wood cabins at the different farms in which they worked. Mount Vernon consisted of five farms.

Betty gave birth to four more children while enslaved at Mount Vernon: Tom Davis (born 1769), Betty Davis (born 1771), Oney Judge (born 1774, died 1848), and Philadelphia or "Delphy" (born 1780, died 1831). Tom and Betty were the children of Thomas Davis, a white man who worked at Mount Vernon as a weaver. Oney Judge was the daughter of Andrew Judge an indentured Englishman who worked at Mount Vernon as a tailor. Delphy's father is unknown, but in 1807 she was freed from slavery by Elizabeth Parke Custis Law, and married William Costin (born 1780), a biracial porter in Washington, D.C., a free man and an abolitionist.

Scholars at Mount Vernon make a strong circumstantial case that William Costin was the unacknowledged son of John Parke Custis and an enslaved woman at Mount Vernon, making Costin a grandson of Martha Washington. An 1882 source described William and Delphy Costin as cousins, the couple gave each of their children the middle name "Parke" — just as Martha Washington and her first husband, Daniel Parke Custis had done — and named one son William Parke Custis Costin.

While Betty had five children total, as a slave she would have been separated from her children for most of the day. Betty also had "little control... over the lives of...[her] children." Austin and Ona were selected by George and Martha Washington to accompany them to New York and Philadelphia after Washington was elected President. There was nothing Betty could do about this, and her children were forced to be separated from her because they were under the control of Martha Washington, who could do whatever she wanted with them. Every child Betty had enriched the Washingtons' and the Custis Estate, as children and young adults provided more enslaved labor. The number of children that Betty had and the varying white fathers may illustrate the sexual vulnerability that enslaved women faced, especially when they worked in the domestic sphere, which put them in close proximity to many white men, not just their owner. (See, for example, the biographies of Alice Clifton, Jane the Runaway, Bridge Town, and Winney Grimshaw.)

== Relationship with Andrew Judge ==
Andrew Judge, an English tailor, came to the colonies in 1772 as an indentured servant. Washington bought his indenture contract, and Judge worked as a tailor at Mount Vernon until about 1780. Betty was around 34 years old when Judge arrived, and she likely interacted with him due to the work that they both did with textiles and tailoring. Judge was the purported father of Betty's daughter, Oney. He eventually worked off his indentures and left Mount Vernon about 1780, settling in Alexandria, Virginia. We do not know if their relationship was consensual.

== Later life and death ==
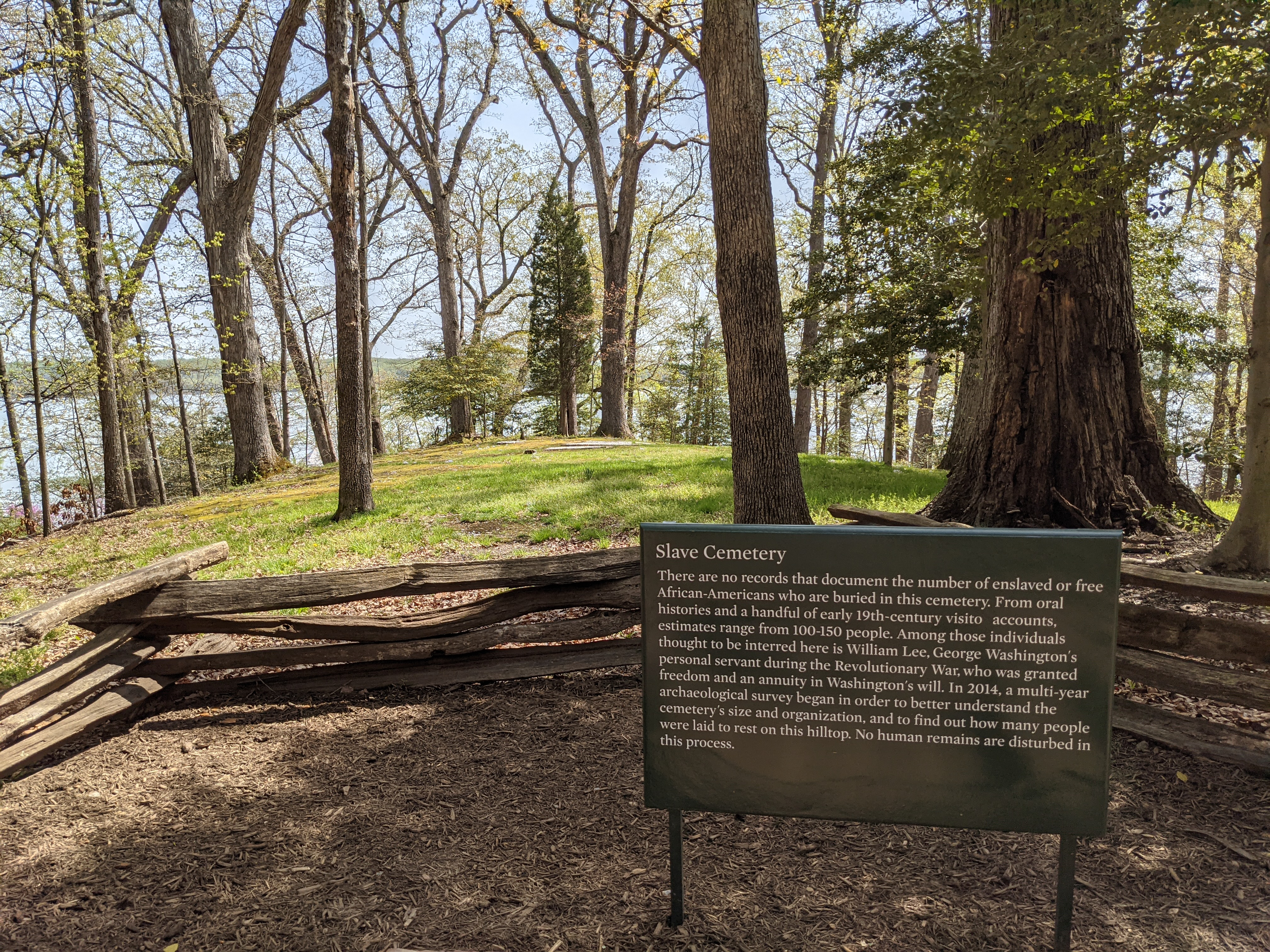
Slave Cemetery at Mount Vernon. Likely Betty's final resting place.

While her children Austin and Ona were working in Philadelphia, Betty labored at Mount Vernon. She became a grandmother to eighteen grandchildren. However, tragedy struck in 1794 when her son, Austin, drowned while traveling back to Virginia from Philadelphia. Erica Dunbar states that this "news was too much for Austin's mother [Betty] to bear." Betty at this point was fatigued by her lifelong work as a slave and had been sick. She eventually died at Mount Vernon in 1795, around 57 years old. Of her death George Washington said "It is happy for old Betty, and her children and friends, that she is taken of[f] the stage; her life must have been miserable to herself, and troublesome to all those around her."

Betty never escaped the bonds of slavery and labored at White House Plantation and Mount Vernon for her entire life. However, two of her daughters, Ona Judge Staines and Philadelphia Costin, did escape their bonds and lived out their lives as free women of color.

== Bibliography ==
- Block, Sharon. Rape and sexual power in early America. Omohundro Institute of Early American History & Culture. Chapel Hill [North Carolina]. ISBN 978-1-4696-0097-0. OCLC 654308329.
- Brady, Patricia (2006). Martha Washington: An American life. Penguin Books. ISBN 978-0-14-303713-2. OCLC 71816332.
- Brady, Patricia (2014). Martha Washington: An American life. Penguin Books. ISBN 978-1-101-11881-8. OCLC 883302217.
- Dunbar, Erica Armstrong (2017). Never Caught: The Washingtons' relentless pursuit of their runaway slave, Ona Judge (First 37 Ink/Atria books hardcover ed.). New York. p. 6. ISBN 978-1-5011-2639-0. OCLC 952647698.
- Fuentes, Marisa J. (2016). Dispossessed Lives: Enslaved women, violence, and the archive (1st ed.). Philadelphia. p. 76. ISBN 978-0-8122-4822-7. OCLC 927401138.
- Morgan, Jennifer L. (Jennifer Lyle) (2004). Laboring Women: Reproduction and gender in New World slavery. Philadelphia: University of Pennsylvania Press. p. 139. ISBN 978-0-8122-3778-8. OCLC 53485319.
- Pogue, Dennis J (October 2005). "Interpreting the Dimensions of Daily Life for the Slaves Living at the President's House and at Mount Vernon". The Pennsylvania Magazine of History and Biography. 129.
