= Granite Freeman =

The Granite Freeman was an abolitionist newspaper published from 1844 to 1846 in Concord, New Hampshire by Joseph E. Hood. Initially published as the Family Visitor, it was merged into the Independent Democrat. It served as a house organ of the Liberty Party before the latter's disappearance into the Free Soil Party in 1848. Hood eventually ended up working for The Republican of Springfield, Massachusetts.

The Granite Freeman is best remembered for the publication of remembrances of Oney Judge concerning her servitude in the household of George Washington, from whom she escaped in 1796.
