= John F. Cook School =

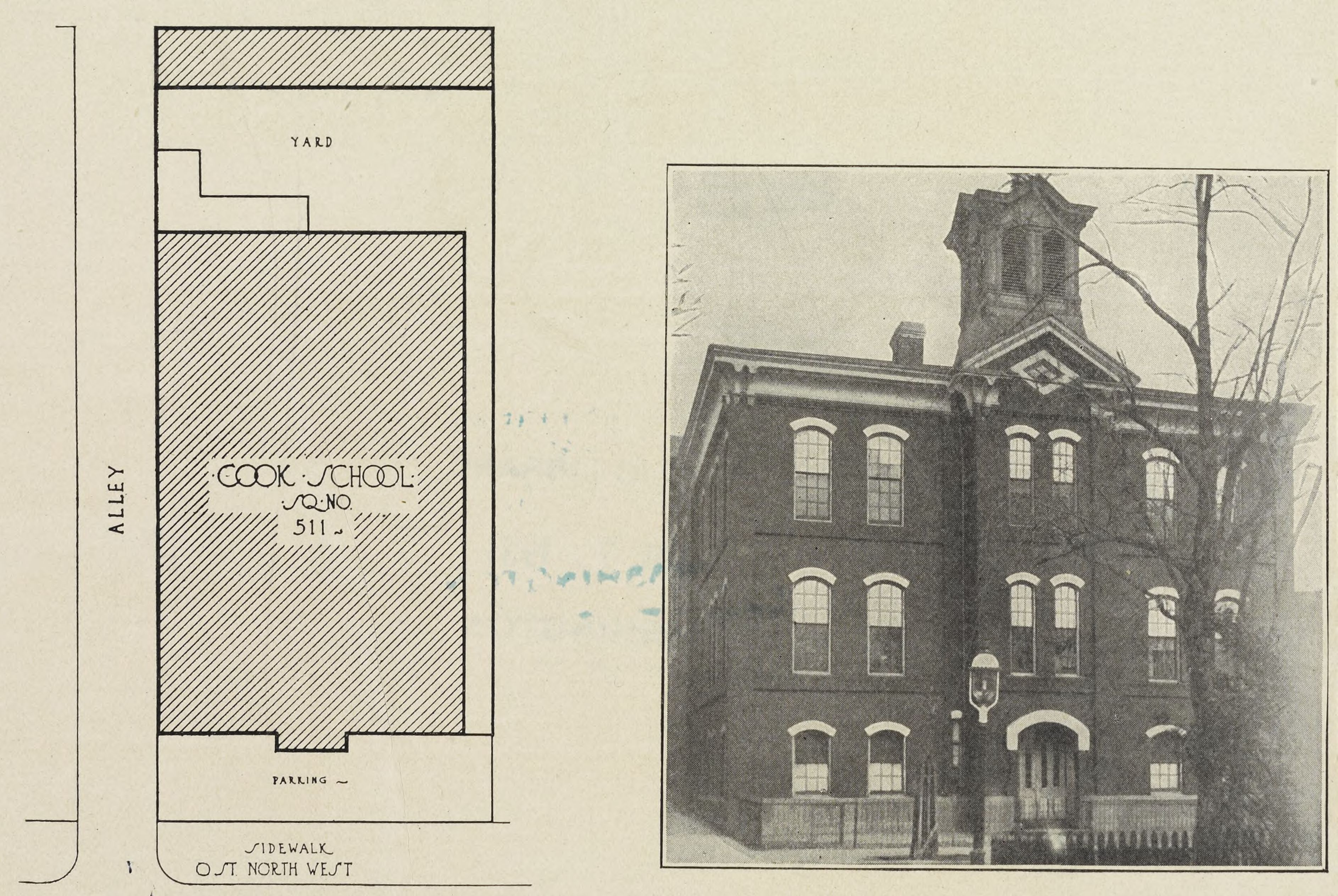
- J.F. Cook School – Original location at 4th and O St. NW, Washington DC

Location
- 30 P Street, NW; Washington, D.C. 20001; United States
- Coordinates: 38°54′34″N 77°00′37″W

Information
- Type: Public, Primary school
- Established: 1867
- Status: closed
- Closed: 2009
- Grades: Pre-k – 6
- Enrollment: 187
- Student to teacher ratio: 13:1

John F. Cook School, established in 1867, was a school for African American students in Washington, D.C.

It closed in 2009, and as of 2013, its former location is now home to the J.F. Cook campus of the Mundo Verde Bilingual Public Charter School.

== History ==
The District of Columbia Compensated Emancipation Act of April 1862 officially ended slavery in the District of Columbia. In addition, this was followed up by a separate May 1862 Act, "An Act Providing for the Education of Colored Children in the Cities of Washington and Georgetown, District of Columbia", which officially established a system of public schools for African American children in DC.

African-American educator, politician, activist, and philanthropist John F. Cook Jr., was at the time teaching at Union Seminary, a school for black students in D.C., which he had previously led until his younger brother George succeeded him.

When Union Seminary was closed in 1867, he established John F. Cook Elementary, naming it in honor of his father, preacher John F. Cook Sr. The original location for the school was between 4th and 5th St. on O St. NW.

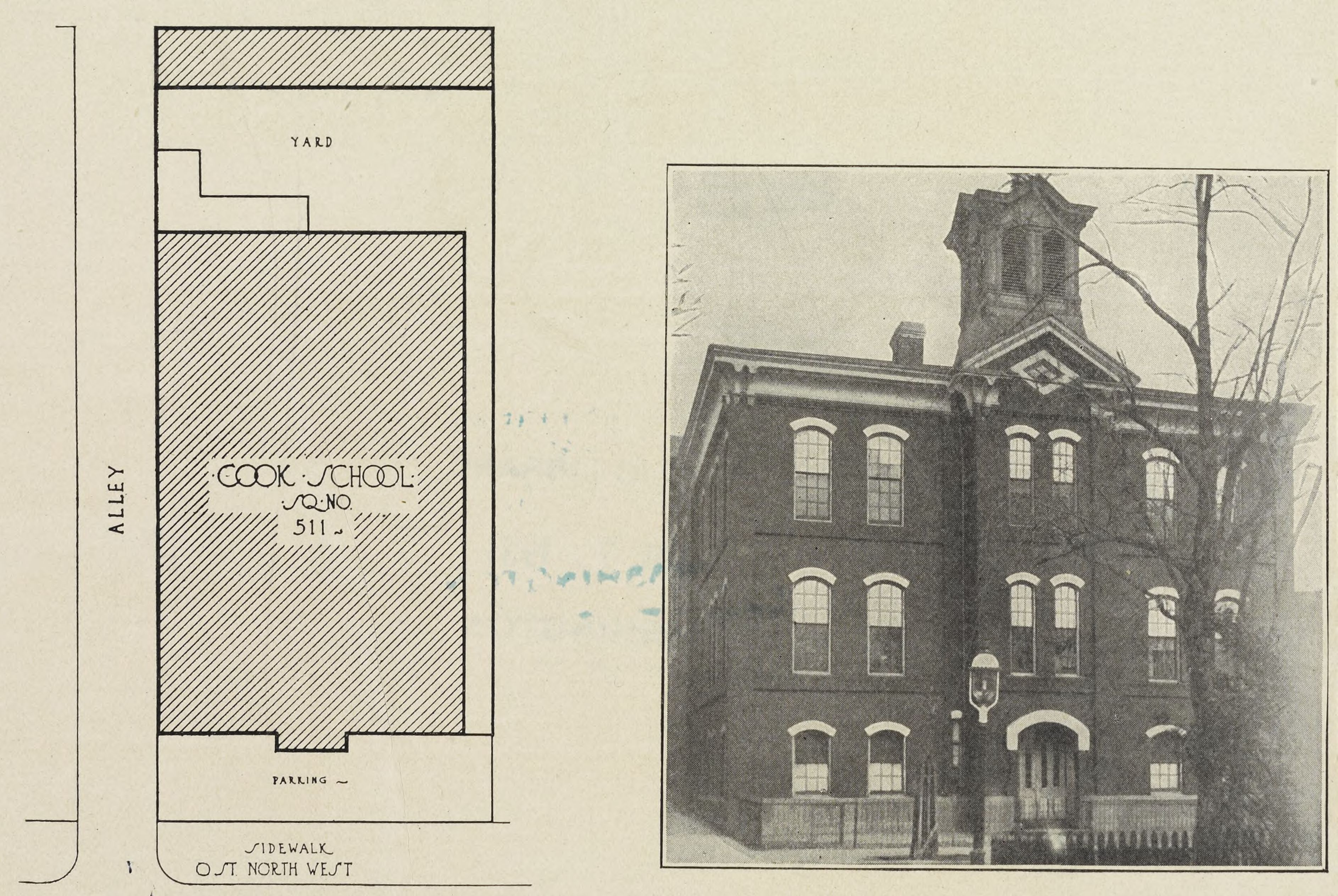
JF Cook School, 1908

A 1908 report by the United States Schoolhouse Commission concerning the schools of Washington DC argued that the original O St. NW building "should be destroyed, and a modern building-erected either on the same site enlarged, or at a different adjacent location on a considerably larger lot".

In 1926, the school was moved to its final location, on 30 P Street NW. where it stayed until closed in 2009. When closed, the school had 187 students, from grades pre-kindergarten to 6th grade, and three teachers. 99% of the students were minority students.

In 1985, the students of Cook Elementary merged with students from Langston-Slater: from then on, pre-kindergarten through third grade students at both schools would attend Cook, and fourth through sixth graders would attend classes in the Slater building, leaving the Langston building vacant.

In 2008, then mayor Adrian Fenty and Schools Chancellor Michelle Rhee included the school in a list of 23 targeted for closure, citing declining enrollment and low test scores. The proposed closure generated complaints from parent and neighborhood groups who claimed they were not consulted.

In 2013, after the school building on P street had lain dormant for five years, the Office of the Deputy Mayor for Education and the Department of General Services awarded the former site of the school to the Mundo Verde Bilingual Public Charter School.
