= John F. Cook Sr. =

American pastor and educator (1810–1855)

John F. Cook, Sr.
- Born: 1810; Washington, D.C., U.S.
- Died: 1855 (aged 44–45)
- Occupation: Presbyterian minister
- Children: John F. Cook Jr.

John Francis Cook Sr. (1810–1855) was an American pastor and educator. He was the first African-American Presbyterian minister in Washington D.C. and the head of the District's Smothers School. John F. Cook School in Washington, D.C., was named in his honor.

== Biography ==
Cook was born in Washington, D.C. He was enslaved until age 16 when his aunt, Alethia Tanner, purchased his freedom.

Cook apprenticed as a shoemaker and became an assistant messenger for the United States Land Commissioner. Cook attended the Smothers School in Washington D.C. In 1834, he succeeded John Prout as head of the Smothers School and renamed it Union Seminary.

In 1835, Cook served as secretary for the fifth Convention for the Improvement of the Free People of Color in the United States. In August 1835, Cook fled Washington DC during the "Snow Riots" when white mobs who came after free Black businesses and schools. It is reported that he opened a school in Columbia, Pennsylvania. He returned to Washington DC in 1836 and remained there for two decades.

In 1838, Cook helped establish Union Bethel Church in D.C. His aunt, Alethia Tanner, was a member there until her death.

In 1841, Cook was licensed as a preacher by the Presbytery of the District of Columbia. That same year, he co-founded the First Colored Presbyterian Church of Washington, D.C. He was ordained as a pastor in 1843 and served at his congregation until his death in 1855.

== Legacy ==
His son, John F. Cook, Jr., founded a Washington, D.C., school and named it in his honor. The Cook family became one of the most wealthy and active families in Washington, D.C. in the 19th century.
