= Alethia Tanner =

American educator

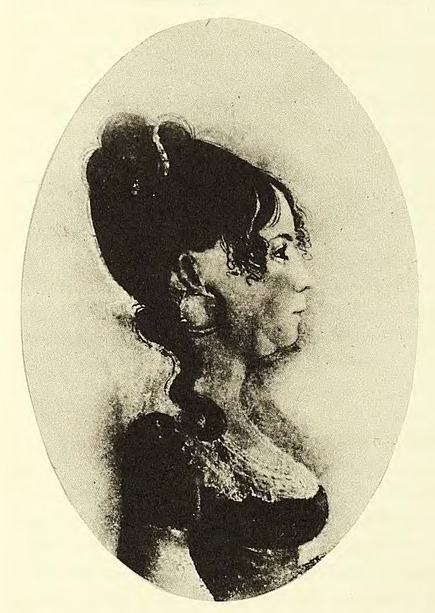
- Image of Alethia Browning Tanner
- Born: c. 1781; Prince George's County, Maryland, U.S.
- Died: 1864
- Occupation: Educator
- Known for: Creation of the first school for free black children in Washington, D.C.

Alethia "Lethe" Tanner (c. 1781–1864) was an American educator and a leader in the African American community of Washington, D.C. in the early nineteenth century. She purchased the freedom of 18 slaves and helped create The Bell School, the first school for free black children in Washington, D.C.

== Biography ==
Alethia "Lethe" Tanner was born in about 1781, enslaved by Tobias and Mary Belt on their plantation in Prince George's County, Maryland. Alethia had two sisters, Sophia (Bell) and Laurena (Cook). Upon the death of Mary Pratt (Tobias predeceased his wife) in 1795, the plantation, known as Chelsea Plantation, was inherited by their daughter Rachel Belt Pratt. Mary Belt's will stipulated that Laurena be sent to live with a sibling of Rachel Pratt's while Sophia and Alethia were to stay at the Chelsea Plantation.

At some point, both Sophia and Alethia grew and sold vegetables at markets in Alexandria, Virginia, and Washington, D.C. Alethia sold vegetables at a market across from the White House. A doctor's bill for Thomas Jefferson indicates that Alethia may have worked in the White House during Jefferson's presidency. However, the details of her service are unknown. This is further supported by the fact that Joseph Dougherty, who purchased Alethia from Rachel Pratt, served as President Jefferson's footman. Some historians believe that Alethia gave the funds to Dougherty so that he could purchase her and then manumit, or free her. Dougherty manumitted Aletha a few days after he bought her. One of the witnesses on her manumission papers in 1810 was William Thornton, the Architect of the Capitol.

In 1826, and for several years after, Alethia saved enough money to purchase freedom for her sister Laurena, Laurena's husband, their children, and many of her family and friends. By 1828, Alethia purchased freedom for ten of Laurena's children, including Hannah Ferguson, Anette, and Aletha Cook, and seven of Laurena's grandchildren. After 1836, Alethia began purchasing the freedom of her neighbors, including Charlotte Davis, John Butler, and Lotty Riggs and her four children.

Among Laurena's children was John F. Cook Sr., who became Union Seminary's schoolmaster, where he established the church and served as its first pastor. He also founded the Young Man's Moral and Literary Society, an antebellum abolitionist debating society for free and enslaved Black people, and co-founded the Union Bethel AME Church and Fifteenth Street Presbyterian Church. During the Snow Riot of 1835, Cook temporarily fled the city when a white mob attacked and burned down the one-room schoolhouse.

Alethia was a businesswoman, owned real estate, and supported and sponsored educational and religious institutions for the free Black community in Washington, D.C. She was a Methodist church member partly because she was drawn to their position on slavery. Later, she and other formerly enslaved African Americans left the church, finding it unwelcoming because they did not want to be confined to the galleria in the church. Alethia, her sister, and her sister's husband joined Israel Bethel African Methodist Episcopal Church. They later purchased it when it was auctioned. When she died, she was a member of Union Bethel AME Church, which was established with the help of her nephew, John Francis Cook Sr.

== The Bell School ==
Alethia, George, Nicholas Franklin, and Moses Liverpool started the first school for free Black children in the District of Columbia, The Bell School, in 1807. The Bell School failed because of a lack of funding and a small student base, leading to the formation of The Resolute Beneficial Society School. Like the first, the second school failed because of limitations caused by segregation. Smaller private schools were then opened. Alethia's safety was jeopardized by the Snow Riot in August 1835, which started as a labor strike but extended into attacks on free Black people. Her nephew, John Francis Cook, fled, but there was no record of her fleeing the area.

== Legacy ==
Tanner Park, a 2.5-acre park in the NoMa neighborhood of Washington, D.C., was named after Alethia Tanner by a community vote in 2020.

In 1882, the Cyclopedia of African Methodism included Alethia Tanner:

TANNER, LETHIA, a remarkable Christian woman, was one of the strong supporters of the Church in Washington, D. C. For years she was regarded as the mother of the Church, and lived to be an old lady and died a member of Union Bethel Church.

== See also ==
- Louisa Parke Costin

== External sources ==
- Sharp, John G, Washington D.C Genealogy Trails Biographies. 2006-2013
- Jessie Carney Smith, ed. (1996). Notable Black American Women, book 2. Detroit, USA: Gale Research Incorporated. p. 625. ISBN 0-8103-9177-5.
- Cook, Susan, research on Alethia "Lethe" Tanner -- https://www.alethiatanner.com/
