= Ona Judge =

Refugee enslaved woman, enslaved by George and Martha Washington

Oney Judge
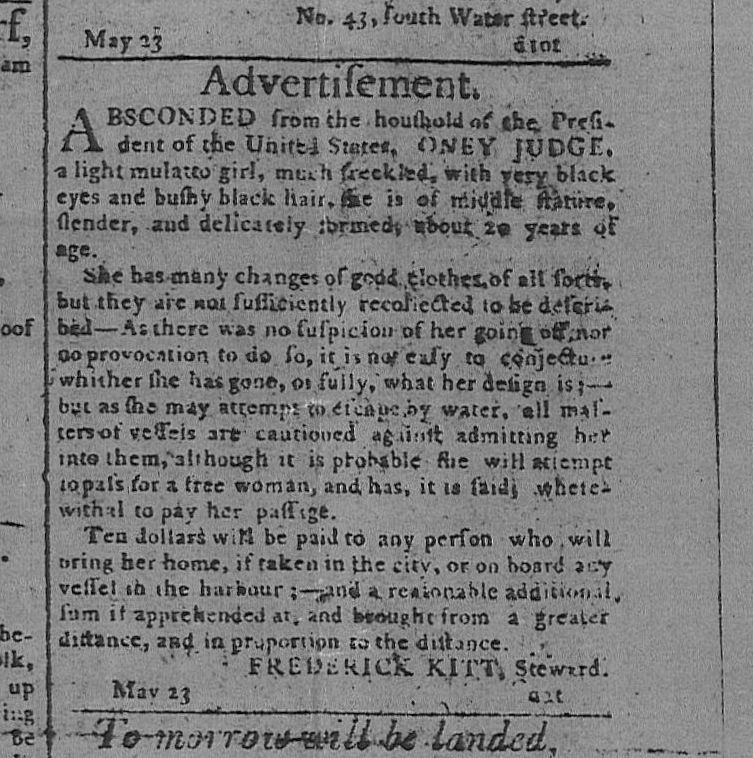
- Runaway advertisement in the Philadelphia Gazette (published as The Philadelphia Gazette & Universal Daily Advertiser), Philadelphia, May 24, 1796
- Born: c. 1773; Mount Vernon, Colony of Virginia, British America
- Died: February 25, 1848 (aged 75); Greenland, New Hampshire, U.S.
- Spouse: Jack Staines
- Children: Eliza Staines; Nancy Staines; Will Staines
- Parent(s): Andrew Judge; Betty
- Relatives: Austin (half-brother); Tom Davis (half-brother); Betty Davis (half-sister); Delphy (half-sister)

Ona Judge Staines (c. 1773 – February 25, 1848), also known as Oney Maria Judge Staines, was a biracial enslaved woman who escaped from George Washington's presidential household, and eluded capture by him and by Martha Washington's relatives.

She was born to Betty, an enslaved seamstress, and Andrew Judge, a white English tailor, on the Washingtons' Mount Vernon Plantation in Virginia, and fled to freedom from the President's House in Philadelphia in 1796. Legally, Judge Staines was still a fugitive slave fifty-two years later, when she died in Greenland, New Hampshire in 1848.

== Background ==
New York City served as the first national capital under the ratified U.S. Constitution. George Washington was elected the first President of the United States in early 1789, and was inaugurated at Federal Hall on April 30, 1789. Judge worked in both of the New York City presidential households, and later in the President's House in Philadelphia.

Although Pennsylvania had begun a gradual abolition of slavery in 1780, slave-holding members of Congress were specifically exempted from that state law. By December 1790, when Philadelphia became the temporary national capital for a 10-year period — while Washington, D.C. was under construction — there were three branches of the federal government. The question of whether the president, vice-president, justices of the U.S. Supreme Court, or any other slave-holding officer of the executive or judicial branches also would be exempted from Pennsylvania's abolition law remained untested.

Judge was in her twenties in May 1796, when she escaped from the Philadelphia presidential household. She had learned that Martha Washington intended to make her a wedding gift to granddaughter Elizabeth Custis Law, which meant that Judge would be returned to Virginia with little chance of ever being free. The steward of the President's House placed runaways ads in several Philadelphia newspapers, and Judge was classified as a fugitive slave.

Judge reached Portsmouth, New Hampshire by ship, and settled into the Black community of the nearby town of Greenland. There she married Jack Staines, bore three children, and converted to Christianity. Although Judge was never freed, Martha Washington's grandchildren ultimately stopped attempting to return her to Virginia and enslavement.

== Early life ==
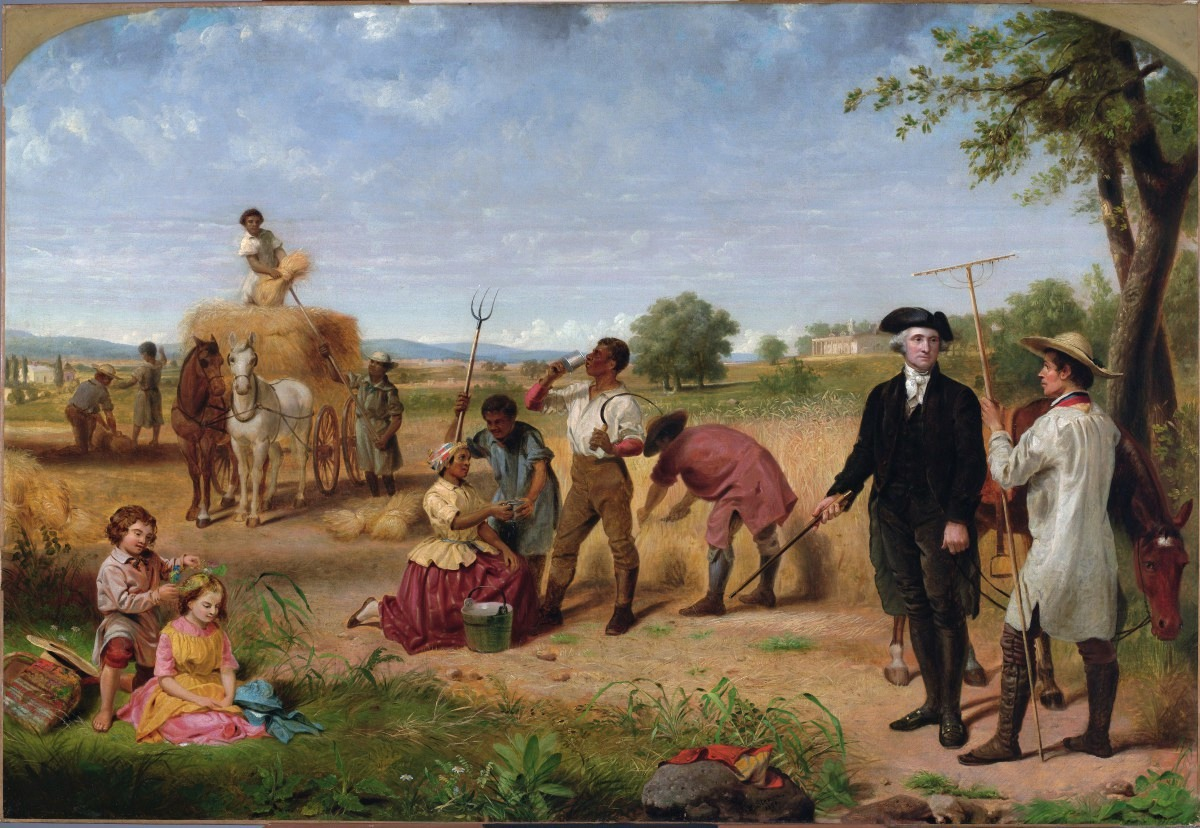
Life of George Washington: The Farmer, a portrait depicting George Washington and Mount Vernon by Junius Brutus Stearns, c. 1853. This painting shows an idealized version of plantation work, far removed from the reality of the harsh conditions endured by the enslaved.

Judge was born about 1773 at Mount Vernon, the plantation of George Washington and his family. (Note: The February 18, 1786, Mount Vernon slave census lists "Oney" as Betty's child and "12 yrs. old".) Her mother, Betty, was of mixed race and enslaved, and her father, Andrew Judge, was a white English tailor working as an indentured servant at Mount Vernon. Though Judge was predominantly of European heritage, she was born into slavery under the premise of partus sequitur ventrem, by which a child was assigned the legal status of the mother.

Judge had a half-brother, Austin, born before 1757 (father unknown); a half-brother Tom Davis and a half-sister Betty Davis (both fathered by white indentured weaver Thomas Davis). In addition, she had a half-sister, Delphy (nickname for Philadelphia, father unknown), born to Betty about 1779. Delphy died on December 13, 1831, after years of freedom.

Their mother Betty was among the 285 African-descended persons enslaved by Daniel Parke Custis (1711–1757), Martha Washington's first husband. Since Daniel Custis died without a will, his widow, Martha Dandridge Custis, received what was called a dower share of his Estate. This meant that, until her death, she was entitled to the use of a third of her deceased husband's wealth, which included at least 85 enslaved people. Though Martha had some control over these dower slaves, they were legally enslaved by her late husband's Estate, so she could neither free nor sell them. She could transfer one or more to her grandchildren.

After Martha wed George Washington in 1759, she took Betty with her to Mount Vernon as one of the dower slaves, along with then-infant Austin. Under the legal principle of partus sequitur ventrem, incorporated into Virginia colonial law in 1662, because Betty was enslaved, her children were born enslaved and legally were the property of the Custis Estate, although under the control of Martha Washington.

Upon completing his indenture, Andrew Judge settled in Alexandria, Virginia, some 11 miles away. He did not maintain contact with Betty, Ona, or any other of his enslaved children.

When Ona Judge was around ten years old, she was brought to live at the Mansion House at Mount Vernon, likely as a playmate for Martha Washington's granddaughter Nelly Custis. Judge eventually became Martha Washington's personal attendant or body servant.

In an 1846 interview late in her life, Judge said she had received no education under the Washingtons nor religious instruction.

More is known about Judge than any other enslaved person on the Mount Vernon plantation because she was twice interviewed by abolitionist newspapers in the mid-1840s, decades after she fled to freedom in New Hampshire.

== The presidential households ==
In 1789, Washington took seven enslaved Africans, including Judge, then 16, to New York City, which was then the nation's capital, to work in his presidential household. The others were her half-brother Austin, Giles, Paris, Moll, Christopher Sheels, and William Lee.

Following the transfer of the national capital to Philadelphia in 1790, Judge was one of nine enslaved persons, two of whom were female, taken by Washington to Philadelphia to work in the President's House. Others were Austin, Giles, Paris, Moll, Hercules Posey, Richmond, Christopher Sheels, and "Postilion Joe" (Richardson).

== Gradual Abolition Act ==
With the 1780 Gradual Abolition Act, Pennsylvania became the first state to establish a process to emancipate enslaved persons. However, no one was freed immediately, and the state law tried to balance emancipation against the property rights of Pennsylvania slaveholders. The process was designed to play out over decades and not end until the death of the last enslaved person born in Pennsylvania prior to March 1, 1780, the date the state law was enacted.

In other words, an infant born to an enslaved mother in Pennsylvania on February 29, 1780, would remain enslaved-for-life so long as the mother's master complied with all state laws regarding slavery, including registering the enslaved child annually. An infant born to an enslaved mother in Pennsylvania on March 1, 1780, would have the legal status of indentured servant at birth. The mother's master would be required to care for the child until age 14, then the child would be indentured to that master for 14 years, and not be free of legal obligations until age 28.

The law immediately prohibited the importation of additional enslaved persons into the state, and required the annual registration of those already held there. But the law also protected the property rights of Pennsylvania slaveholders. If a slaveholder failed to register an enslaved person, that enslaved person could be confiscated by the state and freed. However, if a slaveholder complied with state law and registered their enslaved annually, they would remain enslaved for life. Every future child of an enslaved mother would be born free, but was required to work as an indentured servant to the mother's master from age 14 to age 28.

A slaveholder from another state could bring their enslaved into Pennsylvania and hold them in the state for six months, but if that slaveholder held them in the state beyond that deadline, Pennsylvania law gave those enslaved the power to petition for their freedom. In 1780, Congress was the only branch of the federal government, and met in Philadelphia. Significantly, Pennsylvania exempted slave-holding members of Congress from its 1780 Gradual Abolition Act.

Once the U.S. Constitution had been ratified and the three branches of the federal government had been created, the issue of whether Pennsylvania's slavery law could be applied to slaveholding members of the Executive and Judicial Branches remained untested.

A 1788 amendment to the state law closed loopholes, such as prohibiting a Pennsylvania slaveholder from transporting a pregnant woman into another state so that the child would be born outside Pennsylvania and be enslaved; or prohibiting a non-resident slaveholder from rotating their enslaved in and out of the state to prevent those enslaved from establishing the uninterrupted six-month Pennsylvania residency required to qualify for freedom. This last point would affect the lives of Judge and the other enslaved people in the Washington household.

The U.S. Constitution was ratified by nine of the thirteen former colonies in March 1789, creating a federal government with three branches. New York City was the first national capital under the Constitution; it had no laws restricting slaveholding. In 1790, Congress transferred the national capital to Philadelphia for ten years while the permanent national capital in Washington, D.C. on the banks of the Potomac River was completed in 1800.

With the move of the national capital from New York to Philadelphia, in the increasingly free state of Pennsylvania, there was uncertainty about whether its slavery laws would apply to officers of the federal government. By a strict interpretation, the Gradual Abolition Act exempted only slaveholding members of Congress. But there were also slaveholders among the officers of the judicial branch in the Supreme Court and the executive branch, including the President of the United States.

Washington stated privately that his presence in Philadelphia was solely a consequence of the city being the temporary seat of the federal government. Washington held that he remained a resident of Virginia and should not be subject to Pennsylvania laws regarding slavery.

Attorney General Edmund Randolph's inaction enabled his enslaved workers to establish a six-month residency in Pennsylvania and petition for their freedom, which a court granted. Randolph immediately explained to Washington that the same mechanism could result in Washington's enslaved workers claiming their freedom if they established residency. But Washington could prevent that residency from being established by sending them out of the state before six months had passed. (Note: "This being the case, the Attorney General conceived, that after six months residence, your slaves would be upon no better footing than his. But he observed, that if, before the expiration of six months, they could, upon any pretense whatever, be carried or sent out of the State, but for a single day, a new era would commence on their return, from whence the six months must be dated for it requires an entire six months for them to claim that right.")

Although such a rotation violated the 1788 amendment, Washington's actions went unchallenged due to his position and a lack of enforcement. Washington continued to rotate enslaved people in and out of the President's House throughout his presidency. Washington also was careful never to spend six continuous months in Pennsylvania himself, which would have established his legal residency there.

Philadelphia had a large free Black population. In addition, both Black and white people were active in abolition activities. In the course of their work, enslaved members of Washington's and other politicians' households met free Black people in the city and many learned about laws related to slavery. They learned why masters would move them in and out of the city.

When the first six-month deadline approached, Washington was on his Southern Tour in May 1791. Giles and Paris left Pennsylvania with him in April; Austin and Richmond were sent back to Mount Vernon before the deadline to prevent them from qualifying for freedom. Martha Washington took Judge and Sheels to Trenton, New Jersey, for two days to interrupt their Pennsylvania residency. Moll and Hercules Posey were allowed to remain in Pennsylvania for a couple of days beyond the deadline, then traveled back to Mount Vernon with the First Lady.

Faced with heated opposition by the Pennsylvania Abolition Society, the Pennsylvania legislature abandoned a 1791 proposal to amend the Gradual Abolition Act to extend Congress's exemption to all federal officers who held enslaved people.

In 1842, the U.S. Supreme Court ruled in Prigg v. Pennsylvania that the 1788 amendment to the Gradual Abolition Act, including the section of it that empowered Pennsylvania to free the people enslaved by non-resident slaveowners, was unconstitutional.

== Escape ==
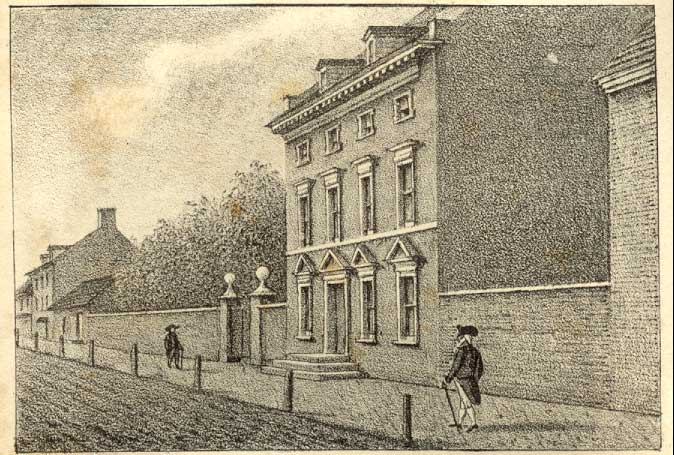
Washington's Residence, High Street, a lithograph in Annals of Philadelphia, an 1830 book by John Fanning Watson

Judge escaped the household on May 21, 1796, as the Washingtons were preparing to return to Virginia for a short trip between sessions of Congress. Martha Washington had told Judge that she was to be given as a wedding present (or otherwise later bequeathed) to Martha's granddaughter Elizabeth Parke Custis Law, who was known among the workers for her fierce temper.

Judge later recalled in an 1845 interview:

Whilst they were packing up to go to Virginia, I was packing to go, I didn't know where; for I knew that if I went back to Virginia, I should never get my liberty. I had friends among the colored people of Philadelphia, had my things carried there beforehand, and left Washington's house while they were eating dinner.

Runaway advertisements in Philadelphia newspapers documented Judge's escape to freedom from the President's House on May 21, 1796. Some offered a reward for her return. This one appeared in The Philadelphia Gazette on May 24, 1796:

Absconded from the household of the President of the United States, ONEY JUDGE, a light mulatto girl, much freckled, with very black eyes and bushy hair. She is of middle stature, slender, and delicately formed, about 20 years of age.

She has many changes of good clothes, of all sorts, but they are not sufficiently recollected to be described—As there was no suspicion of her going off, nor no provocation to do so, it is not easy to conjecture whither she has gone, or fully, what her design is; but as she may attempt to escape by water, all masters of vessels are cautioned against admitting her into them, although it is probable she will attempt to pass for a free woman, and has, it is said, wherewithal to pay her passage.

Ten dollars will be paid to any person who will bring her home, if taken in the city, or on board any vessel in the harbour;—and a reasonable additional sum if apprehended at, and brought from a greater distance, and in proportion to the distance.

FREDERICK KITT, Steward. May 23

== New Hampshire ==
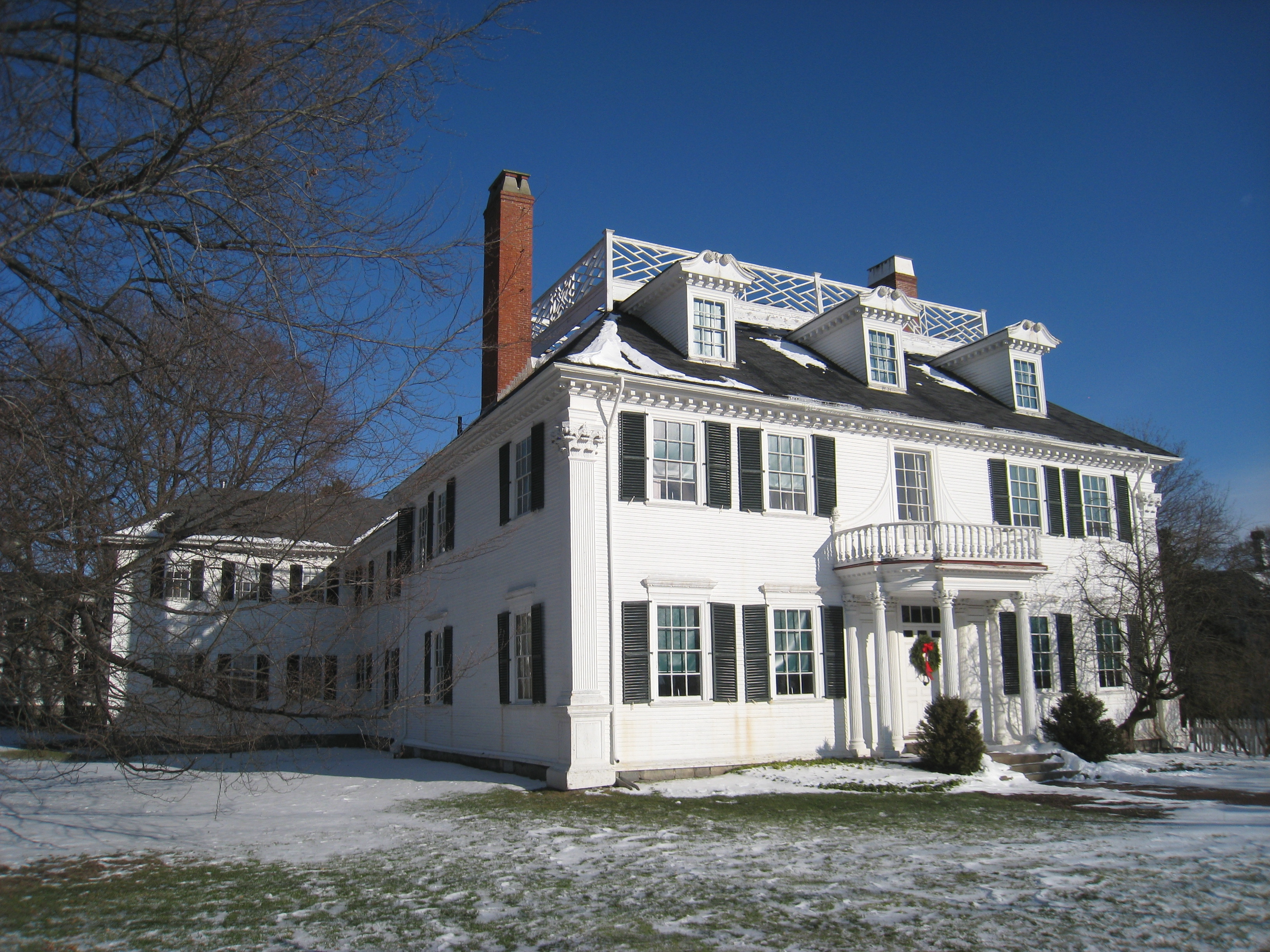
John Langdon House in Portsmouth, New Hampshire, where, over a September 1799 dinner, Burwell Bassett Jr. revealed his plan to kidnap Judge

Judge secured passage or was secretly placed aboard the Nancy, a ship piloted by Captain John Bowles and bound for Portsmouth, New Hampshire. Judge may have thought she had found safe haven, but that summer she was recognized on the streets of Portsmouth by Elizabeth Langdon, the teenage daughter of Senator John Langdon and a friend of Nelly Custis. Washington knew of Judge's whereabouts by September 1, when he wrote to Oliver Wolcott Jr., the U.S. Secretary of the Treasury, about having her captured and returned by ship.

At Wolcott's request, Joseph Whipple, Portsmouth's collector of customs, interviewed Judge and reported back to him. The plan to capture her was abandoned after Whipple warned that news of an abduction could cause a riot on the docks by supporters of abolition. Whipple refused to place Judge on a ship against her will but relayed to Wolcott her offer to return voluntarily to the Washingtons if they would guarantee to free her following their deaths.

... a thirst for compleat freedom ... had been her only motive for absconding.

— Joseph Whipple to Oliver Wolcott, October 4, 1796.

An indignant Washington responded directly to Whipple:

I regret that the attempt you made to restore the Girl (Oney Judge as she called herself while with us, and who, without the least provocation absconded from her Mistress) should have been attended with so little Success. To enter into such a compromise with her, as she suggested to you, is totally inadmissible, for reasons that must strike at first view: for however well disposed I might be to a gradual abolition, or even to an entire emancipation of that description of People (if the latter was in itself practicable at this moment) it would neither be politic or just to reward unfaithfulness with a premature preference [of freedom]; and thereby discontent before hand the minds of all her fellow-servants who by their steady attachments are far more deserving than herself of favor.

Washington could have used the federal courts to recover Judge — the Fugitive Slave Act of 1793 (which he had signed into law) required a legal process to return an escaped enslaved person over state lines. Any court case, however, would have been part of the public record and attracted unwelcome attention.

Washington retired from the presidency in March 1797. In August 1799, he wrote to his nephew, Burwell Bassett Jr., requesting help capturing and re-enslaving Judge. Bassett traveled to New Hampshire in September and tried to convince Judge to return to enslavement in Virginia.

By this point, she was married to a seaman named Jack Staines (who was away at sea) and was the mother of an infant. Bassett met with her, but she refused to return to Virginia with him. Bassett was Senator Langdon's houseguest that night, and over dinner, he revealed his plan to kidnap the young woman. This time, Langdon helped Judge Staines, secretly telling her to go into hiding immediately. Bassett returned to Virginia without her.

Following Judge's 1796 escape, her younger sister, Delphy, was “given” by Martha Washington to her granddaughter. Eliza Custis Law and her husband manumitted Delphy and her children in 1807, after they were already living with Delphy's husband William Costin in Washington City.

=== Family ===
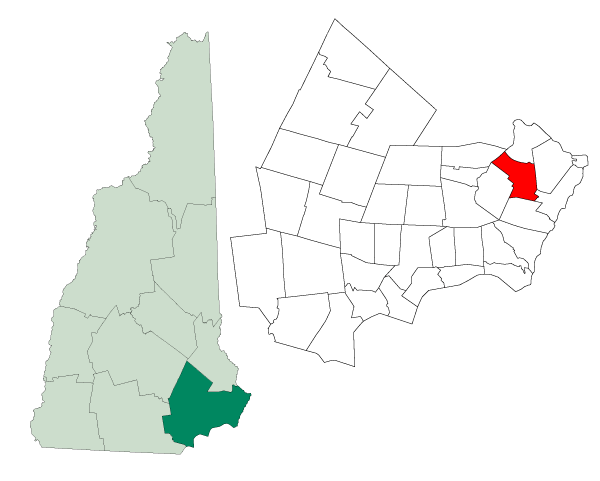
Greenland in Rockingham County, New Hampshire, where Judge married her husband Jack Staines in January 1797

In New Hampshire, Judge met and married Jack Staines, a free Black sailor. Their January 1797 marriage was listed in the town records of Greenland and published in the local newspaper. They had three children:

- Eliza Staines (born 1798, died February 14, 1832, New Hampshire, no known offspring)
- Will Staines (born 1801, death date & location unknown, no known offspring)
- Nancy Staines (born 1802, died February 11, 1833, New Hampshire, no known offspring)

In freedom, Judge Staines learned to read and became a Christian. Judge and her husband had fewer than seven years together; he died on October 19, 1803. As a widow, Judge Staines was unable to support her children and moved in with the family of John Jacks Jr. Her daughters Eliza and Nancy Staines became wards of the town and were hired out as indentured servants; her son Will was apprenticed as a sailor.

Judge Staines's daughters died fifteen years before she did. Her son reportedly never returned to Portsmouth. After the elder Jacks died, Rockingham County donated firewood and other supplies to Judge Staines and the Jacks sisters, all too old to work by then.

== Never freed ==
George Washington died on December 14, 1799; his will directed that the 124 people he enslaved be freed following his wife's death. Martha instead signed a deed of manumission in December 1800, and her late husband's enslaved persons were freed on January 1, 1801. The 153 or so dower slaves at Mount Vernon remained enslaved, as neither George nor Martha could legally free them without reimbursing the Custis estate.

Following Martha Washington's 1802 death, the dower slaves reverted to the Custis estate. They were divided among the Custis heirs, her grandchildren.

Judge Staines remained a dower slave all her life, and legally, her children also were dower slaves, property of the Custis estate, even though their father, Jack Staines, had been a free man. Article IV, Section 2 of the U.S. Constitution guaranteed the property rights of enslavers from whom enslaved people had escaped; under U.S. law, this superseded Staines' parental rights. Under the principle of partus sequitur ventrem, a child's status as enslaved or free followed that of the mother.

The Fugitive Slave Act of 1793 — passed overwhelmingly by Congress and signed into law by Washington — established the legal mechanism by which a slaveholder could recover persons who had escaped enslavement. The Act made it a federal crime to assist an escaped enslaved person or to interfere with their capture and allowed slave-catchers into every U.S. state and territory.

Following Washington's death, Judge Staines probably felt secure in New Hampshire, as no one else in the Washington family was likely to mount an effort to take her. But legally, she and her children remained fugitives until their deaths. Her daughters predeceased her by more than a decade, and it is unknown what happened to her son.

Ona Judge Staines died in Greenland, New Hampshire, on February 25, 1848.

== Interviews on slavery ==
Interviews with Judge Staines were published in the May 1845 issue of The Granite Freeman and the January 1847 issue of The Liberator, both abolitionist newspapers. They contained a wealth of details about her life. She described the Washingtons, their attempts to capture her, her opinions on slavery, her pride in having learned to read, and her strong religious faith. When asked whether she was sorry that she left the Washingtons since she labored so much harder after her escape than before, she said: "No, I am free, and have, I trust, been made a child of God by the means."

== Legacy and honors ==
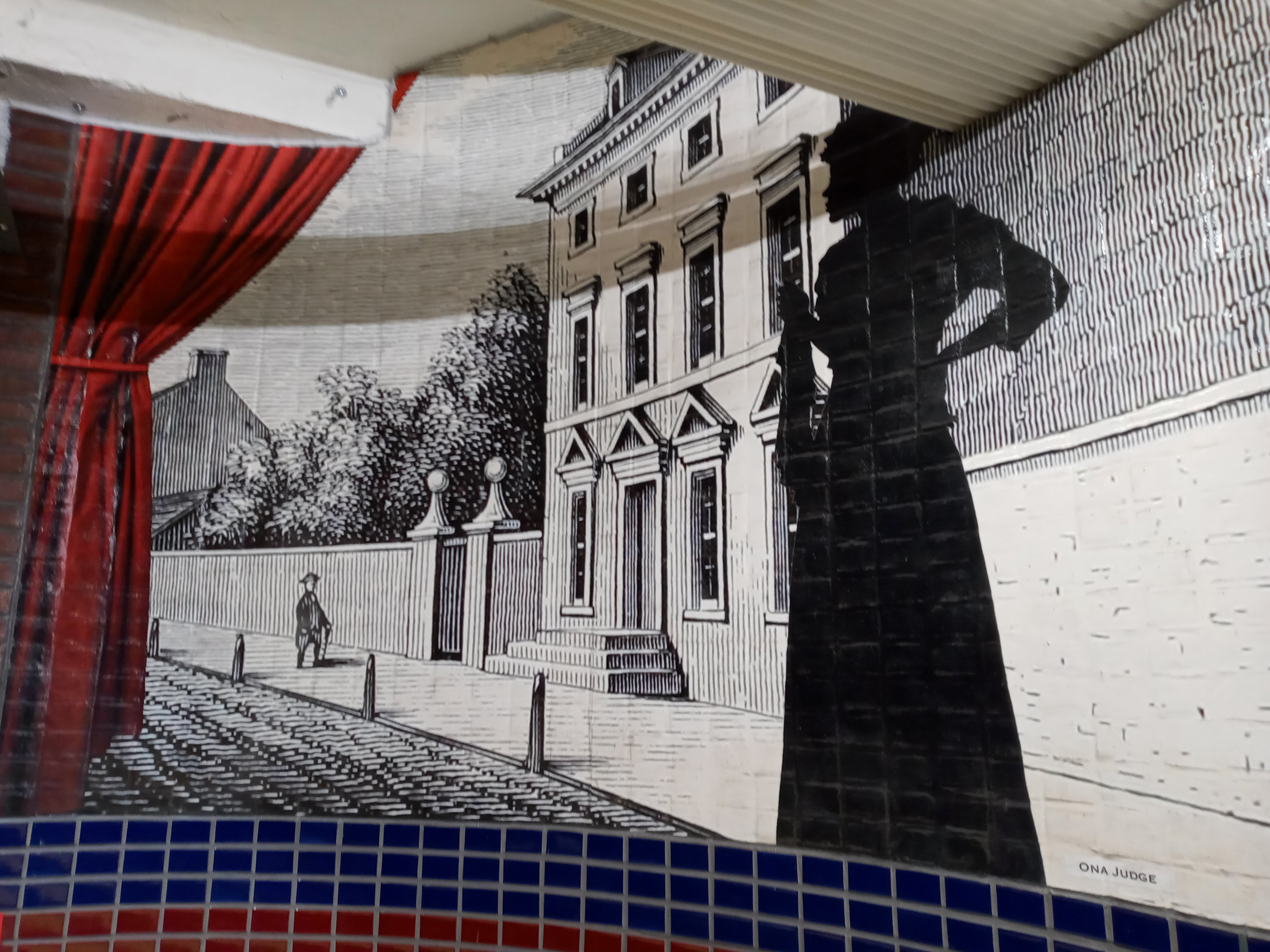
Silhouette portrait of Judge at 5th Street/Independence Hall station.

On February 25, 2008, the 160th anniversary of Judge's death, Philadelphia celebrated the first "Oney Judge Day" at the President's House site. The ceremony included speeches by historians and activists, a proclamation by Mayor Michael A. Nutter, and a memorial citation by the City Council.

In January 2026, President Donald Trump ordered that this exhibit be removed. The next month, on President's Day, a federal holiday honoring Washington's legacy, U.S. District Judge Cynthia Rufe ruled that the exhibit be restored to its original condition. She cited a quote from George Orwell’s dystopian novel Nineteen Eighty-Four “Ignorance is Strength.” The George W. Bush appointee compared the Trump administration to the book's Ministry of Truth, which altered historical records to suit its false narrative.

"Oney Judge Freedom Day," the 214th anniversary of her escape to freedom, was celebrated at the President's House site on May 21, 2010. The President's House Commemoration: Freedom and Slavery in the Making of a New Nation, at 6th & Market Streets in Philadelphia, opened in December 2010. It includes a video about Oney Judge and information about all nine enslaved people held at the house. It also honors the contributions of African Americans to Philadelphia and the U.S.

On June 19, 2021, known as Juneteenth, a Virginia State Historical Marker honoring Judge was unveiled on Mount Vernon Memorial Highway near the Mount Vernon estate in Fairfax County, Virginia.

On May 3, 2025, the Black Heritage Trail of New Hampshire unveiled a marker honoring Judge in Greenland, New Hampshire.

In April 2026, the Philadelphia City Council voted to create an annual "Ona Judge Day", celebrated every May 21 to recognize and honor her memory.

== In popular culture ==
=== Books ===
- Taking Liberty (2002), a novel by Ann Rinaldi
- The Escape of Oney Judge (2007), a children's book by Emily Arnold McCully
- My Name Is Oney Judge (2010), a children's book by Diane D. Turner
- Oney: My Escape From Slavery (2017), a novel by Diana Rubino and Piper Huguley
- Never Caught: The Washingtons' Relentless Pursuit of Their Runaway Slave, Ona Judge (2017), a biography by Erica Armstrong Dunbar
- Never Caught, the Story of Ona Judge: George and Martha Washington's Courageous Slave Who Dared to Run Away (2017), a Young Readers Edition by Erica Armstrong Dunbar and Kathleen Van Cleve
- Runaway: The Daring Escape of Ona Judge (2021), a children's book with verse by Ray Anthony Shepard and illustrations by Keith Mallett
- My Name is Ona Judge (2022), a novel by Suzette D. Harrison

=== Theater ===
- A Thirst for Freedom (2000), a play by Emory Wilson, produced at The Players' Ring Theater in Portsmouth, New Hampshire
- A House with No Walls (2007), a play by Thomas Gibbons, initially produced at InterAct Theatre Company in Philadelphia, with subsequent productions throughout the United States.
- Parallel Destinies (2010), a dance and theater piece by choreographer Germaine Ingram, composer Bobby Zankel, and visual artist John Dowell, a work-in-progress at the Philadelphia Folklore Project

=== Video ===
- Oney Judge's Escape from the Washingtons (2008), the third episode of Drunk History on Comedy Central in which stand-up comedian Jen Kirkman recounts Judge's life for the Funny or Die web video series
- The Freedom Quest of Oney Judge (2015), a video by HERO Live! in Colonial Williamsburg for students in fourth to eighth grades that uses 21st-century technology and dramatizations with reenactors to play the roles of historical figures

== See also ==
- Alexander Macomb House, the second presidential mansion in Lower Manhattan
- George Washington and slavery
- List of enslaved people
- List of enslaved people of Mount Vernon
- Samuel Osgood House, the first presidential mansion in the Civic Center neighborhood of Manhattan
