= John F. Cook Jr. =

19th century businessman, civil rights activist

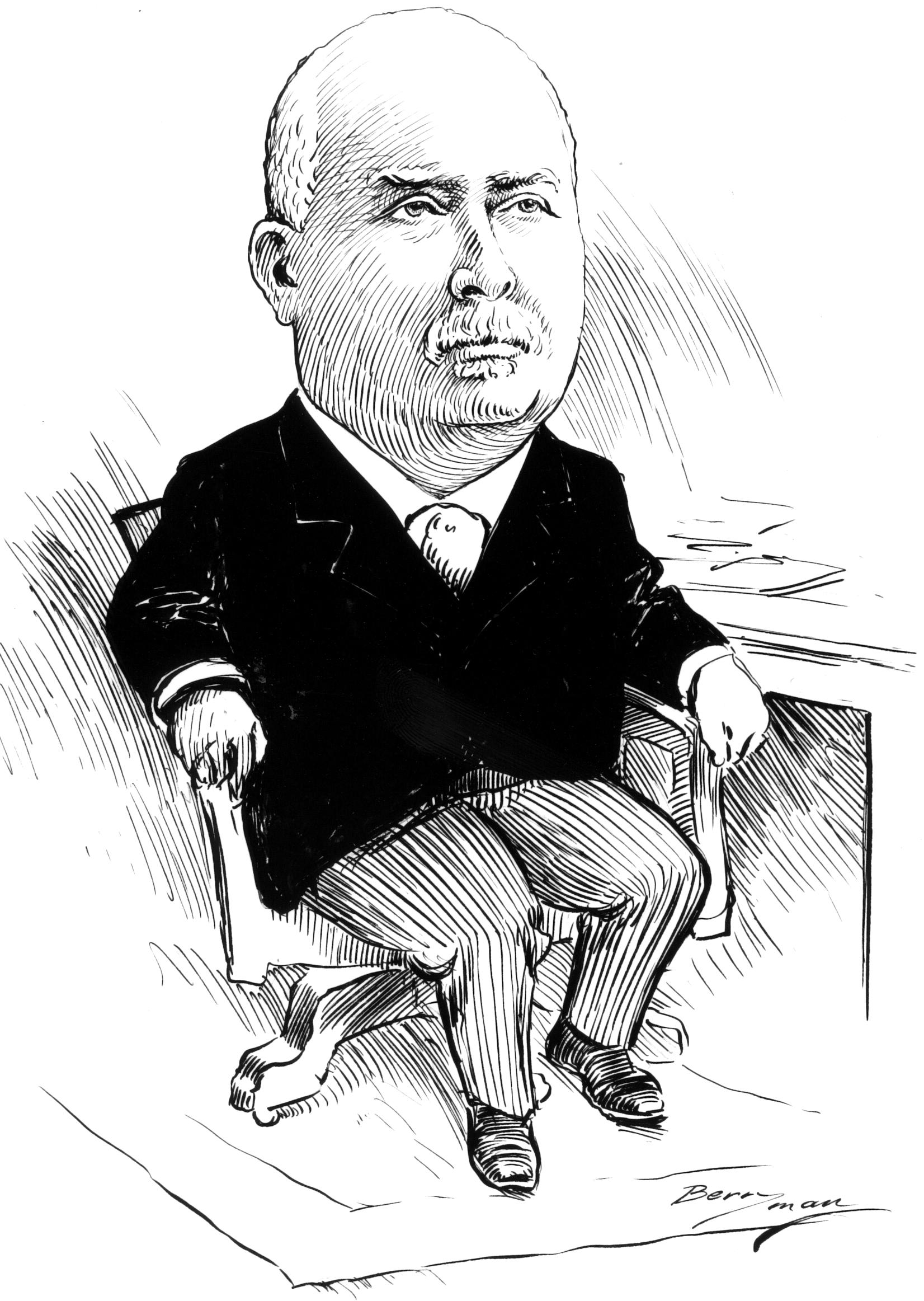
- 1905 caricature by Clifford K. Berryman
- Born: September 1833; Washington, D.C., United States
- Died: January 20, 1910 (aged 76)
- Occupations: Educator, politician, tax collector, businessman
- Known for: Civil rights activism
- Spouse: Helen Appo (m. 1864)
- Children: 5
- Father: John F. Cook Sr.

John Francis Cook Jr. (September 1833 – January 20, 1910) was a prominent businessman, politician and civil rights activist who was a member of the Washingtonian African-American elite of the late 19th century. Born into an established, middle-class family in Washington D.C., Cook was believed to at point point to be D.C.'s richest black resident.

Over his career, he served as a tax collector, educator, and community organizer, among other roles. Cook was also a staunch opponent of Jim Crow laws and the Colonization movement.

== Early life and education ==
John Francis Cook Jr. was born in September 1833 to one of Washington D.C.'s most wealthy and distinguished African-American families. His father, John F. Cook Sr. (1810-1855), was born a slave in the Washington DC area. At 16 years old, Cook Sr.'s industrious aunt, Alethia "Lethe" Tanner, bought him, his mother and several of his siblings freedom for $1,450. Cook Sr. went on to become a prominent figure in Washington D.C.'s religious and educational community for freed blacks. Among other things, Cook Sr. led Union Seminary, a school for black students in D.C., founded the Young Man's Moral and Literary Society, an antebellum abolitionist debating society for free and enslaved blacks, and co-founded Union Bethel Church. Cook Sr. also founded the Fifteenth Street Colored Presbyterian Church in Washington, DC and served from 1843 to 1855. John F. Cook Jr.'s mother, Jane Mann, was the daughter of Rachel Mann who was 'full-blood' Native American and Congressman John Randolph of Roanoke.

Cook Jr. was first educated at Union Seminary while his father was the headmaster. He attended Oberlin College in Ohio at the age of twenty with his younger brother, George F.T. Cook (1835–1912), from 1853–1855. Cook Jr. and George left Oberlin before finishing their undergraduate studies and returned to D.C. in 1855 at the news of their father's death.

== Career ==
=== Education ===
Upon returning to Washington, D.C. in 1855, Cook became the head of Union Seminary, replacing his late father. Cook led Union Seminary until 1857 when his younger brother, George, succeeded him. Though no longer in charge, Cook remained active in Union Seminary until its closure in 1867, the same year public schools were opened for black children. During that ten-year period, Cook continued teaching, even doing so at a great personal risk. In 1859, he was warned by government officials in D.C. that if he were to continue teaching black students, he would be arrested. This prompted Cook to move to New Orleans where he opened a school for black students and continued to teach. After a few years, however, he caught the attention local authorities and was issued a similar warning. By that time, the threat had subsided in D.C., and Cook returned to embark on a long and illustrious career in politics and activism.

Returning to D.C. in 1862, Cook recognized a shortage of schools in D.C. as a result of the increased population during the Civil War. He erected a school for black children and named it after his father, the late John F. Cook. A lifelong educator like his father, Cook was also on the board of trustees and executive committee for Howard University (1875-1910) and served on the District's Board of Education (1906-1910).

=== Politics and public service ===
Following the closure of Union Seminary, Cook entered local government—and local politics soon after. In 1867, he began a clerkship in the office of the District tax collector. He would later be appointed by President Ulysses S. Grant to be D.C.'s chief tax collector, serving for ten years from 1874 to 1884. In 1868, Cook was elected to the Board of Aldermen in the second elections in which black residents could vote. In 1869, Cook was appointed as a Justice of the Peace and served as such until 1876. In 1868, Cook began to get involved in local Republican politics, utilizing his wealth and connections to gain influence. Cook served as the District's delegate to the Republican National Convention in 1872 and 1880. Cook was also appointed to be D.C.'s Jury Commissioner in 1889 and was a member of the Board of Children's Guardians from 1892 to his death in 1910.

=== Political activism ===
Cook's social and political activism and influence was not limited to his work within government; he was a committed community organizer and activist in the black community and beyond. Cook was a trustee for many cultural and philanthropic institutions throughout his adult life, including the Frederick Douglass Memorial and Historical Association, the Home for Destitute Women and Children, and the Coleridge-Taylor Musical Society, among others. These institutions, in tandem with Cook's educational and political efforts, strived to enrich African-American culture and uplift the black community of D.C. However, Cook also had to expend his effort, money, and political influence to battle dangerous and discriminatory laws and practices against the black community.

In response to the Colonization Movement—which proposed (and executed) the practice of transporting former slaves and free blacks to colonies in Africa and South America—, Cook helped launch the Social, Civil, and Statistical Association, a group of elite black Washingtonians who opposed colonization. Cook and two other members of the SCSA were in a committee of five African-Americans who on August 14, 1862 addressed an unimpressed President Lincoln on the subject—Lincoln being an advocate of colonization. While unsuccessful in their attempts to dissuade the President from his plans, the visit marked the first time an all-black delegation had the opportunity to address the President. However, Cook was wary about "taking the responsibility of answering the President on a matter in which more than four million of his people were concerned." The delegation included Cook, Benjamin McCoy, John T. Costin, Cornelius Clark, and chaired by Edward Thomas. Cook, Thomas and Clark were SCSA members.

Cook was one of the leaders of the First Ward Civil Rights Association, and he helped to get a petition signed by 2,500 citizens and into Congress to be debated, which pushed for democratic representation and the boycotting of many segregated white establishments. Cook was also a vocal critic of Jim Crow laws and used his political influence to stifle their presence in D.C.

Following the Emancipation Proclamation, Cook and other elite, black Washingtonians harbored fears that the influx of former slaves to D.C. would reverse much of the black community's progress. Despite these concerns, Cook presided over a July 4 parade that many freed blacks attended, celebrating the Emancipation Proclamation, the Union Army's victory, and the passing of the 13th Amendment.

=== Freemasonry ===
John F. Cook Jr. was very active in African American Freemasonry (also known as Prince Hall Affiliation) in Washington, DC. Cook was made a Freemason in Eureka Lodge #5. After serving as Worshipful Master of his lodge he was eventually elected Grand Secretary and then Grand Master of what was then known as the Union Grand Lodge (Now known as the Most Worshipful Prince Hall Grand Lodge of the District of Columbia) in 1866. John F. Cook Jr. would be the longest serving Grand Master in his masonic jurisdictions history. In 1871, John F. Cook Jr. oversaw the severance of ties between his Grand Lodge and the National Grand Lodge (Compact). John F. Cook Lodge #10 in Washington, DC is named in his honor.

== Personal life ==
John F. Cook Jr. was married to Helen Appo Cook (1837-1913), and together they had five children: Elizabeth Appo, John Francis III, George Frederick, Charles Chaveau, and Ralph Victor. Helen Appo was a prominent and influential activist in her own right. She helped found the National Colored Women's League and served as its president for decades.

With his inheritance, Cook made real estate investments, and in 1895 he was reported to be D.C's wealthiest black resident, worth over $200,000. Due to this wealth, in addition to his political power, Cook and his wife repeatedly appeared on D.C.'s "elite black 400," a list of prominent African-American socialites. His wealth and high social standing drew criticism from other blacks, and he did not earn the respect of many whites. Wealthy whites believed that Cook was trying to create an aristocratic society of wealthy blacks who, "clamored for admission to the theatres on the white level," and believed they were worthy of the same respect as whites. Low to middle-class blacks believed that Cook only cared about the wealthy blacks, and could not identify with him, as they believed he was only concerned with the elite black community. Cook also served for ten years as Grand Master of what is now the Most Worshipful Prince Hall Grand Lodge of the District of Columbia (MWPHGLDC). He was a Worshipful Master of Eureka Lodge #5, one the oldest and most prestigious Free Masonry lodges in D.C.

Cook also served many years on the board of trustees for the Columbian Harmony Society, which owned one of the largest African American cemeteries in Washington, D.C. Cook was buried at Columbian Harmony Cemetery, and later, his wife, Helen Appo Cook, and other Cook family members.

== Legacy ==
John F. Cook Jr. dedicated his life to the advancement of the black community in Washington D.C. As an educator, politician, activist, and philanthropist, Cook promoted political and cultural causes, tasked with uplifting D.C.'s African American community, in addition to fighting racist and discriminatory policies and practices. And as a member of Washingtonian's black elite, Cook demonstrated living proof that a black man in 19th century United States could infiltrate the three main spheres of influence in American life: the political, the social, and the economic.
