= Jane the Runaway, Bridge Town =

Jane was an enslaved woman from Bridge Town, Barbados who lived during the late 18th century. Enslaved by a white colonist named John Wright, Jane's life illustrates a bigger picture regarding slavery and violence in the British West Indies. Jane was enslaved in West Africa and brought over through the Atlantic slave trade to Barbados. She was described by her markings in her runaway advertisement which made Jane’s body seem vulnerable. The exact date of Jane’s self-liberation from Wright is unsure but it was possibly a few days prior to 13 January 1789 when he published a runaway advertisement for Jane in the Barbados Mercury. Wright offered a 20 shilling reward for the person who would return Jane to him.

== Country Marks vs Enslaved punishment marks ==
Historian Marisa J. Fuentes, in her work Dispossessed Lives: Enslaved Women, Violence, And The Archive discusses the life of Jane in her first chapter of her book."Left only with the newspaper trace of her scarred body, we lose her alongside 'all the lives that are outside of history.'"

"Jan. 13, 1789 "RUNAWAY: A short black skin negro women named JANE, speaks broken English, has her country marks in [sic] her forehead and a fire brand on one of her breasts, likewise a large mark of her country behind her shoulder almost to the small of her back, and a [stab] of a knife in her neck. Whoever will bring said negro to the subscriber in Bridge Town shall receive 20 shillings... John Wright." -Barbados Mercury.

The ad was intended to make the public aware of an enslaved woman who ran away so that she would be returned to her owners. Fuentes discusses the scars that were inflicted on enslaved people’s bodies to show who they belonged to. Jane’s scars included a mark on her forehead, a firebrand on her breast, on her shoulder, as well as a stab of a knife on her neck. Some of these marks would be a constant reminder of "pain and unfreedom;" historians believe Jane's "country marks" on her forehead and a few other places on her body were ritual marks or scars given to her in Africa. The rest of the marks inflicted on Jane were punishment scars, showing a key fact of ownership: someone is able to abuse you.

== Enslaved Sexual Vulnerability ==
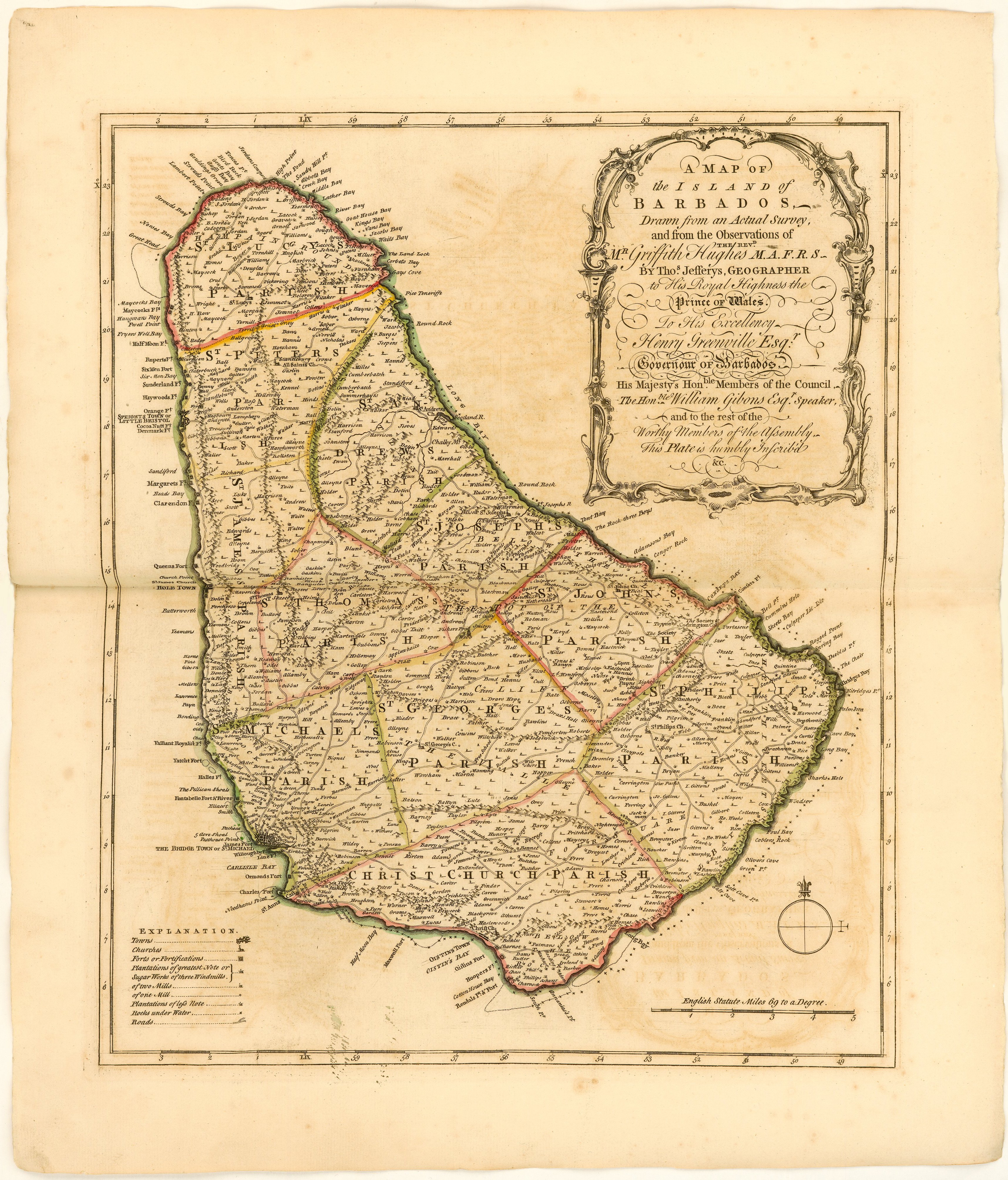
Thomas Jeffery 1750: map of Barbados

Enslaved women were subjected to the power and control of their owners in multiple spaces, such as work and living spaces. These enslaved women were vulnerable to any kind of treatment from the privileged white men in the household or even within the community. The primary work of the enslaved women in Barbados was agricultural labor on sugar cane plantations but some enslaved women also did domestic work inside the homes of white Barbadian colonists, especially in settlements such Bridge Town. Domestic work for an enslaved woman included cooking, cleaning, as well as sewing. This kind of work could mean sexual danger for these urban women since they were so close to the colonists that could possibly inflict violence.

As a runaway in Bridge Town, Jane could have possibly experienced the fear of being a woman alone in the town surrounded by white and Black free men. Rape was a constant fear for the enslaved black women. Enslaved women were not able to resist sexual assaults on their bodies. Jane could have possibly experienced these same fears as a runaway slave in Bridge Town. There was no easy direct way off the island so Jane would have had to survive concealed in the busy midst of the town.

Being generally vulnerable to sexual relations, enslaved women in Barbados might conceive of a pregnancy. Any children bore from the maternal side of an enslaved would result in the offspring being enslaved as well. This exploitation of the enslaved women's bodies was a statement that their bodies and anything that came from them was owned and enslaved.

The control of an enslaved women's body was also profit and more control for the slave owners. Pregnancy generally made it more difficult for enslaved women to escape. Sometimes slave owners tried to get their female slaves pregnant, as it was a profit to the owners. This exploitation of an enslaved women's bodies with forced sex, reminded these Black women that they had no control, not even over their own bodies or reproductive system.

== Concubinage and Sexual Exploitation ==
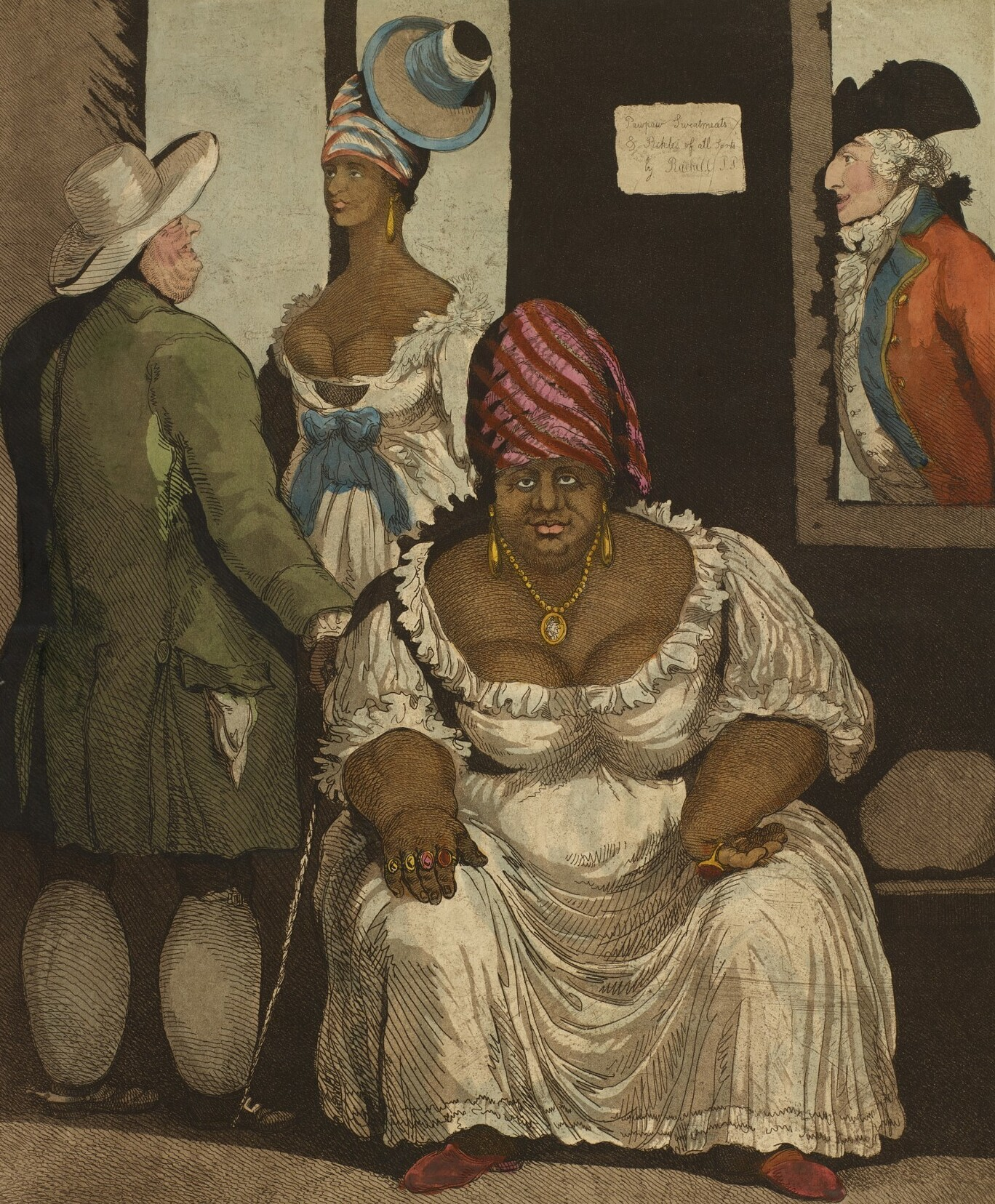
1796 portrait of Rachel Pringle Polgreen

Bridge Town, Barbados in the late eighteenth century was a busy trade port for the island. The free Black population in Bridge Town was small but eventually grew. Even though some Black men and women were free from slavery, there was still no escape from the social, political, and economic oppression. Fuentes believes that Jane would have run to Bridge Town to look for work to blend in with the rest of the community. Most of the work opportunities for the free Black women were small trades, domestic work in homes, store keeping, and prostitution.

The main occupation for enslaved women was prostitution. Slave owners could profit from enslaved women bodies not only by encouraging pregnancy, but also by selling sexual access to white men, violating these women's bodies. Rachael Pringle Polgreen was a freed, elite, Black woman in Bridge Town, Barbados in the late eighteenth century. Polgreen owned slaves and a brothel to sustain herself economically. She was well known all over Bridge Town to the newspaper, the Royal Navy, to white elites, as well as to other freed black elites in the community.

Polgreen's brothel was to serve the sexual desires of those willing to pay for the services. Polgreen's enslaved women were available and disposable in the sexual labor. This forced "hiring-out" of enslaved women's bodies made them vulnerable to violence and reinforced their status as sexual objects. Fuentes has written that the historical record on Jane does not contain information on her eventual fate. In her work on Jane, Fuentes notes that the sexual violence that she was likely to have faced from the white Barbadian colonists during her life, placing the lack of information on such violence into a larger pattern of sexual assaults against enslaved Black women in Barbados and the wider Atlantic World going unreported.
