= Alice Clifton =

Enslaved woman tried for infanticide

Alice Clifton (born c. 1772) was an African-American teen enslaved by John Bartholomew in Philadelphia. She was brought to trial on April 18, 1787, for the murder of her infant daughter, found guilty, and sentenced to death. Following the sentence, a mob formed to prevent her execution out of protest for unjust circumstances because she was coerced into killing her baby by the father of the child, Jack Shaffer. Clifton was between fifteen and sixteen years old at the time of the trial. Clifton was mentioned in only one primary source known to date, the court record for her case.

Alice Clifton was an enslaved African-American woman owned by John Bartholomew in Philadelphia. She was brought to trial on April 18, 1787 for the infanticide murder of her infant daughter, found guilty, and sentenced to death. At the time of the trial, Clifton was between fifteen and sixteen years old. Alice Clifton was mentioned in only one primary source known to date, the court record for her case and consequently disappeared from historical archives following her trial.

== Background ==
Slavery had existed in Pennsylvania since 1639 when there were mentions of enslaved blacks by New Netherlands officials. Groups such as the Quakers, a Christian group known for their tolerance, had members that believed that Black people and whites should be allowed to attend church together. However, Pennsylvania was still accepting of slavery in their colony and did not treat enslaved individuals as equals. Although the slave market was not as massive as it was in the Deep South, it was still present. While Pennsylvania did not have the largest population of slaves compared to other states such as the Carolinas or Virginia, the people of Pennsylvania were extremely intolerant towards slaves.

Around the time that Alice Clifton’s Trial started, there were 6 thousand enslaved individuals that were recorded in the colony of Philadelphia in 1780. Slaves during this time were stripped of their rights and free will and treated as property, Black women at this time were not only seen as property, but their children were as well. Because of this, Black women were highly valued for their ability to give birth to children that could be subject to slavery once born, thus giving plantation owners access to free property.

Evidence of Trial in Pennsylvania Colonial Records pg.1

Although there is only one primary source on Alice Clifton, it is established that she was from Philadelphia and was owned by a slave holder named John Bartholomew. In 1787 Alice Clifton had given birth to a child at the age of sixteen after she had been sexually assaulted by Jack Shaffer, she then murdered her child after being coerced by Shaffer within the home of her master.

== Trial ==
On April 18th, 1787 Alice Clifton was brought to trial for the murder of her newborn daughter. At this time in Pennsylvania slaves and freed slaves were supposed to be tried in the same manner as white people. However, due to the severity of her crime, Alice was tried according to the old laws that were used in the slave courts. During the entirety of the trial, Alice was never allowed to defend herself or make her own case. Instead, multiple witnesses and medical professionals were brought up to the stand to speak about the incident on her behalf. Over the course of the trial, it is revelaed that Alice had been pregnant for six months leading up to the birth and death of her child and that she had repeatedly denied being pregnant to her owners up until the dead body of her child was found. The body was found wrapped in a petticoat and hidden at the bottom of a chest in the room opposite to where Alice had given birth and its throat had not been slit. Upon the discovery of the child, Alice had been left alone with her daughter for ten minutes while the rest of the house was gathered and an inquest was called for. It is believed that it was during this time that she slit the child’s throat.

Evidence of Trial in Pennsylvania Colonial Records pg.2

The two medical doctors that were brought up to the stand to state their professional opinions on the matter, Dr. Jones and Dr. Foulke, both state that they believed the child had been born dead, adding that the slit on its throat was not its actual cause of death and instead was done later due to promises made to Clifton by the child’s father. On top of that we come to find out that Alice had in fact been raped repeatedly by John Schaffer, a traveling merchant who worked with her owner John Bartholomew, who had promised to buy her freedom and spoil her with riches if she was able to hide the birth, kill the child, and get away with it. Despite the evidence presented that showed that the child had been born deceased and that its mother had been coerced into the concealing of its birth and the slitting of its throat, Alice was still charged with the murder of her child and given the death penalty. The jury felt that an acquittal was needed due to the evidence provided but the judge had left them no room to do so, so they instead asked for an executive pardon, which she was later granted.

== Analysis ==
An excerpt shared within a local newspaper. The Pennsylvania Packet, May 28,1787. pt.1

The trial itself leaves one with many unanswered questions. It is important to analyze each of the aspects that played a key role in the results of the trial, it is critical to understand these not as separate incidences but as part of the entire narrative that was occurring to many enslaved women during these times.

An excerpt shared within a local newspaper. The Pennsylvania Packet, May 28,1787. pt.2

=== Importance of Enslaved Women's Bodies ===
Enslaved women during this time, specifically those that were fertile, were taken care of only to a certain extent, merely due to the fact that their bodies were capable of bearing more enslaved property for their masters. In the book They Were Her Property: White women as Slave Owners in the American South, historian Stephanie Jones-Rodgers recognizes that the majority of the slave economy within the United States was ran by Southern white women who were the masterminds behind trading and exploiting enslaved women to suit the needs of the plantation owners and the families they did business with. White women determined when these enslaved women and wet nurses would best serve them and their families. They eventually would either trade or sell enslaved women due to the needs of others around them.

==== Rape ====
The father of Clifton's baby was found to be Jack Shaffer. Doctor Foulke, one of the doctors questioned in the court record, testified that Clifton confessed to him many incidences of forced sex by Jack Shaffer, resulting in the conception of her daughter. The fact that Alice had been raped was only minorly addressed within the court trial, but during this time it was widely known that neither law or culture openly acknowledged the dark reality of enslaved women being sexually violated by white men. Conception in many of these cases was considered a defense to rape rather than evidence for it: conception requires orgasm; orgasm is pleasurable; pleasurable intercourse is consensual; thus, conception equals consent. White men’s racial and class identity allowed them to coerce sex from enslaved women, and redefined this narrative as consent.

===== Discourse of Infanticide and Law in Pennsylvania =====
Alice Clifton was accused and tried never having spoken within her trial, which was a harsh reality of many enslaved individuals being criminally charged in early American societies. Enslaved women had no legal right to shape the laws that were put in place to control these aspects of their lives, nor could they control the circumstances surrounding their conception, but they held total autonomy over whether the pregnancy was discovered or whether the baby survived. Some African American enslaved women also used abortifacients in an attempt to control their birth rates.

Another well known account that involved infanticide is case of Margret Garner. Margret loved her children so deeply that she killed them in order to assure they would never live as salves. The choice of infanticide could have been done for a number of reasons, including not wanting to bear a child into slavery or claiming agency over their own body by being the ones to determine if and when they had children.

Infanticide laws were treated equally as criminal laws. Infanticide laws and their prosecutions as a whole provided historians of criminal justice with evidence on the status of women and servants within the community and how they addressed these problems within unwed, pregnant women. Race, of course, played a major role on how communities responded to infanticide. “Between 1670 and 1780, black women were found guilty of ... infanticide at a rate one and one-half times that for white women, despite the fact that blacks (men and women combined) constituted only 3 to 4 percent of the New England population”. Following Clifton’s case, as well as others that focus on slave infanticide, the murdered child was considered to be destroyed property of the slave owner adding an additional legal dimension to each of these situations.

== See also ==
- Suicide, infanticide, and self-mutilation by slaves in the United States
