= Edward C. Gleed =

US Army Air Force officer with Buffalo Soldiers (1916–1990)

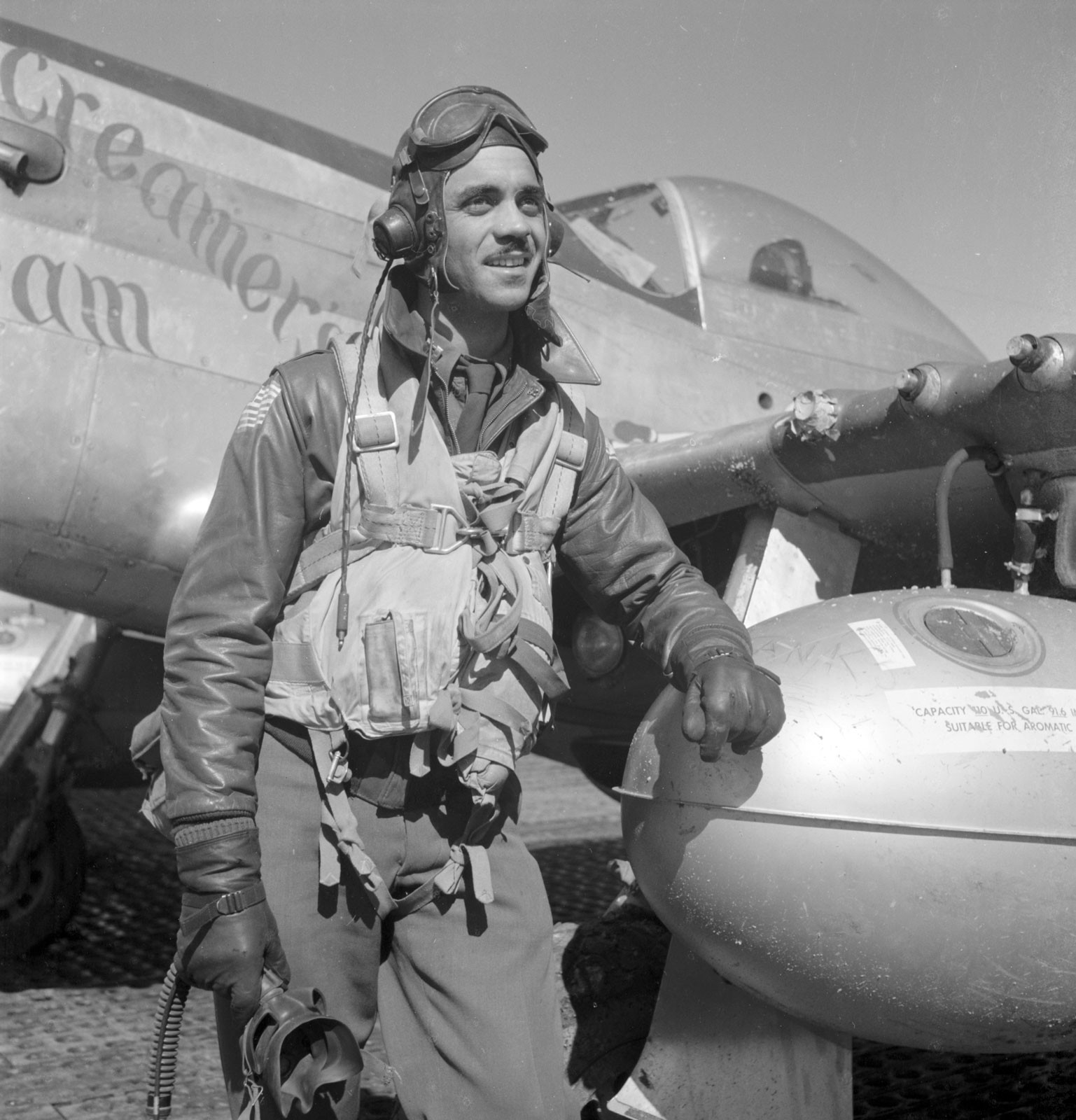
Tuskegee Airman Edward Gleed with his P-51

Edward Creston Gleed (November 5, 1916 – January 25, 1990) was a U.S. Army Air Force officer with the famed Buffalo Soldiers/9th Cavalry Regiment (United States), 332nd Fighter Group’s operations officer, and combat fighter pilot with the 99th Fighter Squadron, best known as the Tuskegee Airmen. He was one of the more prominent members of Tuskegee Airmen's ninth-ever aviation cadet program, as well as one of 1,007 documented Tuskegee Airmen Pilots. His classmates included Robert B. Tresville (May 9, 1921 – June 24, 1944), West Point's seventh African American graduate and the 100th Fighter Squadron's Commanding Officer.

Gleed is well known for his P-51D Mustang aircraft, "The Creamer's Dream", which has been the subject of several famous, widely distributed photographs.

== Early life, family, ties to First Lady Martha Washington, Robert E. Lee ==
Gleed was born on November 5, 1916, in Lawrence, Kansas. He was the son of Herbert J. Gleed Sr. (1885–1965) and Carrie Syphax Joseph Gleed (1888–1943), a former home economics professor at Tuskegee Institute and scion of the powerful Syphax family, one of the most elite African-American families during the 19th century.

Gleed's mother Carrie was the grandchild of Nancy Syphax, granddaughter of Maria Carter Syphax. Maria was the mullato daughter of George Washington Parke Custis, First Lady of the United States Martha Washington's grandson. Maria Carter Syphax's white half-sister through George, Mary Custis, was the wife of Confederate General and Washington and Lee President, Robert E. Lee.

Gleed had one sibling, older brother Herbert Joseph Gleed Jr. (1915–2006).

After attending high school in Lawrence, Gleed attended and graduated from the University of Kansas. He also attended Howard University School of Law before departing for the U.S. Army Air Corps.

He was married to Lucille Elbertha Graves Gleed (1917–2004). They had three daughters: Elizabeth Gleed Ingersoll, Elaine Gleed Williams, and Carol Gleed Weaver.

== Military career, Buffalo Soldier, Tuskegee Airmen ==
On February 8, 1941, Gleed enlisted in the U.S. Army's famed Buffalo Soldiers/9th Cavalry Regiment (United States) at Fort Riley, Kansas where he briefly served in military intelligence. In 1942, the U.S. Army Air Corps reassigned Gleed to Tuskegee, Alabama where he entered the Tuskegee Flight School's aviation cadet program. On December 13, 1942, Gleed graduated as a member of the Single Engine Section Cadet Class SE-42-K, receiving his wings and commission as a 2nd Lieutenant, service number 0-794598. His classmates included Robert B. Tresville (May 9, 1921 – June 24, 1944), West Point's seventh African American graduate and the 100th Fighter Squadron's Commanding Officer.

The U.S. Army Air Corps assigned Gleed to the 332nd Fighter Group, where he became its Operations Officer as well as the Squadron Commander for its 301st Fighter Squadron. He also served in leadership in the 477th Bombardier Group.

On July 27, 1944, Gleed earned two official kills after shooting down two enemy German Focke-Wulf Fw 190 during a German armament plant strafing mission near Budapest, Hungary. For his heroics, the U.S. Army Air Corps awarded Gleed the Distinguished Flying Cross. He flew numerous bomber escort, patrol and strafing missions where he and his squadron destroyed bridges, oil refineries, supply dumps, and grounded aircraft. He is well known for his P-51D Mustang aircraft "The Creamer's Dream", which has been the subject of several famous, widely distributed photographs.

After World War II, Gleed served in both the Korean War and the Vietnam War. In 1947, the 332nd Fighter Wing at Ohio's Lockborne AFB was activated under Gleed's command, with the 332nd Fighter Group as a key component. In 1970, Gleed retired from the military as a full Colonel after nearly 30 years and 6,000 flying hours in the U.S. Army Air Corps and the U.S. Air Force.

== Post-military ==
After his retirement from the U.S. military, Gleed worked as a system program manager and chief administrator/contract negotiator for two defense contractors.

In 1976 at the age of 60, Gleed graduated from Los Angeles, California's Southwestern University School of Law.

== Death ==
Gleed died on January 25, 1990. He was 73. Gleed was interred at Riverside National Cemetery, Plot Section 43, site 1462, in Riverside, California.

== See also ==
- Executive Order 9981
- List of Tuskegee Airmen
- List of Tuskegee Airmen Cadet Pilot Graduation Classes
- Military history of African Americans
