= Philip Lee (valet) =

Enslaved American (b. c. 1785)

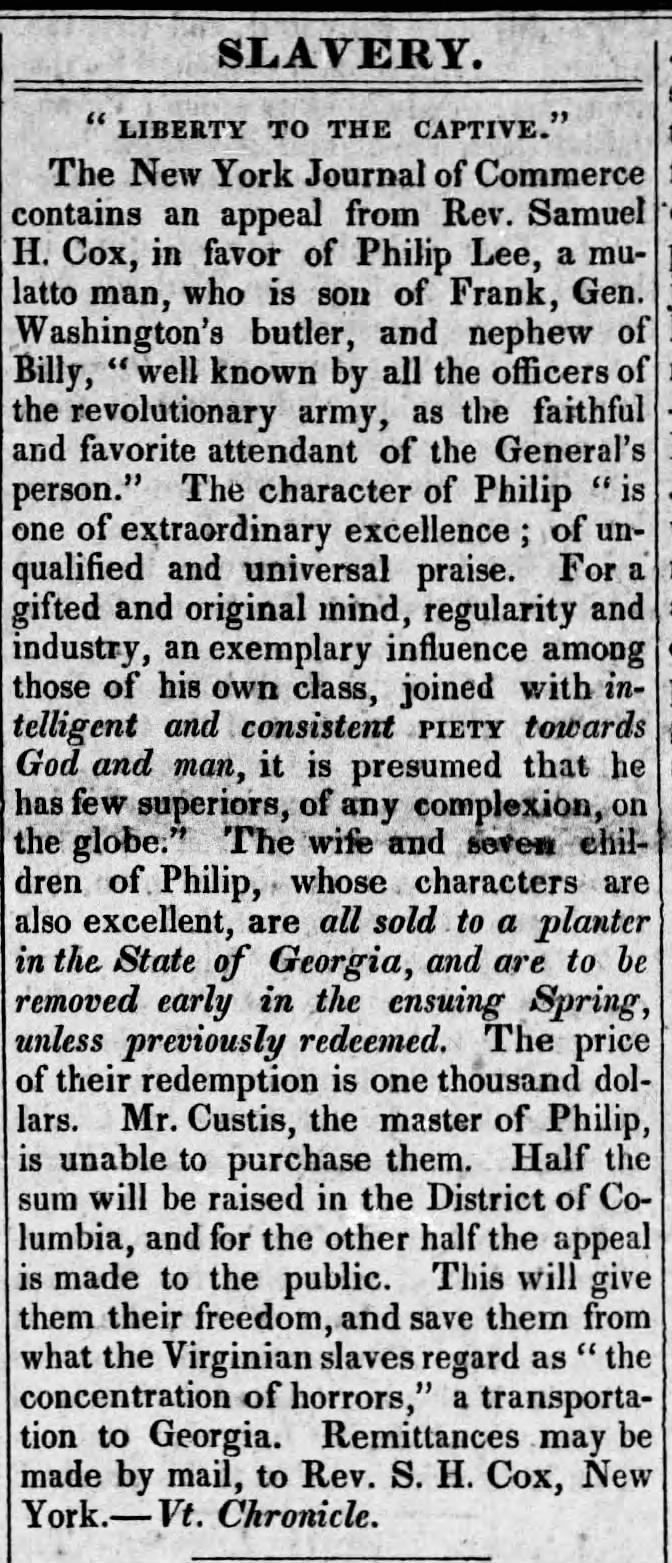
- "Liberty to the Captive" February 6, 1829
- Born: c. 1785; Virginia, U.S.
- Other names: Phil, Uncle Phil

Philip Lee (c. 1785 – ?), also known as Phill and Uncle Phil, was an enslaved American of mixed race who lived for most of his life at Arlington House plantation, now the site of Arlington National Cemetery. Lee was kin to a number of key servants at Mount Vernon plantation in Virginia. Lee served as valet and body servant to George Washington Parke Custis for at least 32 years, beginning in 1800. G. W. P. Custis was the step-grandson of U.S. president George Washington and father-in-law of Confederate Army general Robert E. Lee. Custis repeatedly described Lee as a man of sterling character, and considered him a friend. Custis trusted Lee with long-distance errands such as delivering George Washington memorabilia to New York City and delivering four Virginia opossums to the Marquis de Lafayette.

In 1829, Lee's wife and seven children, who had a different legal owner than Lee and lived on a different plantation, were to be sold to slave traders and transported to Georgia. With fundraising publicity organized by Custis, businessmen Arthur Tappan, Richard Varick, and Eleazar Lord, and ministers Ralph Randolph Gurley and Samuel Hanson Cox, New Yorkers and people of the District of Columbia donated the $1,000 necessary to purchase Lee's wife and his seven children (all under 11 years old), thus saving them from being sold south.

== Early life ==
Philip Lee was most likely born in the 1780s, possibly in 1785. He was part of a notable kinship network of slaves attached to Mount Vernon and the Washington–Custis–Parke–Lewis–Lee family of slave owners. Because the legal status of "slave" was matrilineal, when Lee was born he was considered one of the "dower slaves" that Martha Washington had inherited from the Custis family. Philip Lee was the son of Lucy, who worked as a cook, and butler Frank Lee, who served as the butler at Mount Vernon "for nearly half a century." He was also a nephew of William Lee (who had served as General Washington's body man during the American Revolutionary War), a cousin of Christopher Sheels, and the grandson of Old Doll. Lee had at least two siblings, Mike Lee and Patty Lee, and possibly a third, named Edmund, who died young. Philip Lee was listed on an index of Custis dower slaves as "Phill" and was valued at £90. Lee was described as "mulatto" and his association with the aforementioned servants of General Washington provided him with some measure of social capital, which allowed him access to people and places that were typically off-limits to slaves.

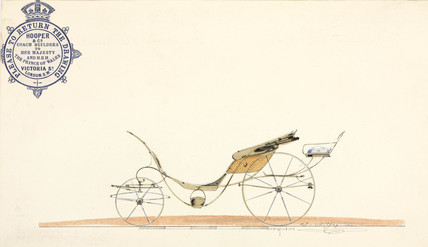
A phaëton such as driven by Custis and Lee was a rather sporty horse-drawn carriage

According to the diary of Martha Custis Williams, who was "second cousin of Mary Custis Lee (the wife of Robert E. Lee) and a grandniece of George Washington Parke Custis," the association of Lee and G. W. P. Custis may have predated the death of Martha Washington. Writing in 1854, Williams recorded the following anecdote:

This evening Uncle was telling me some of the incidents of his younger days. Among others the time when he first got his new Phaton. Grandmama Washington, he said gave him the Mount Vernon Fisheries for a year & he made by it a thousand dollars – With 600 of this, he determined to get a [blank] He wrote to some friends in Philadelphia who procured an elegant one – Kings yellow & black was the body & the wheels were scarlet – & so the part underneath – The equipage arrived in Alexandria & Uncle with his servants & horses went up from Mount Vernon – 'Never, said he shall I forget the joy of that day, nor the great to do, that was made, when I arrived at Mount Vernon in it – they all came out to see me – I sent to England to know what were my coat of arms Livery & got for answer blue & white – so, Phill my servant, in his blue & white livery trimmed with white worsted lace, all of wh[ich] was procured in England, was sometimes mounted by my side and I drove four horses. Oh! those were happy days my child, that will never come again!

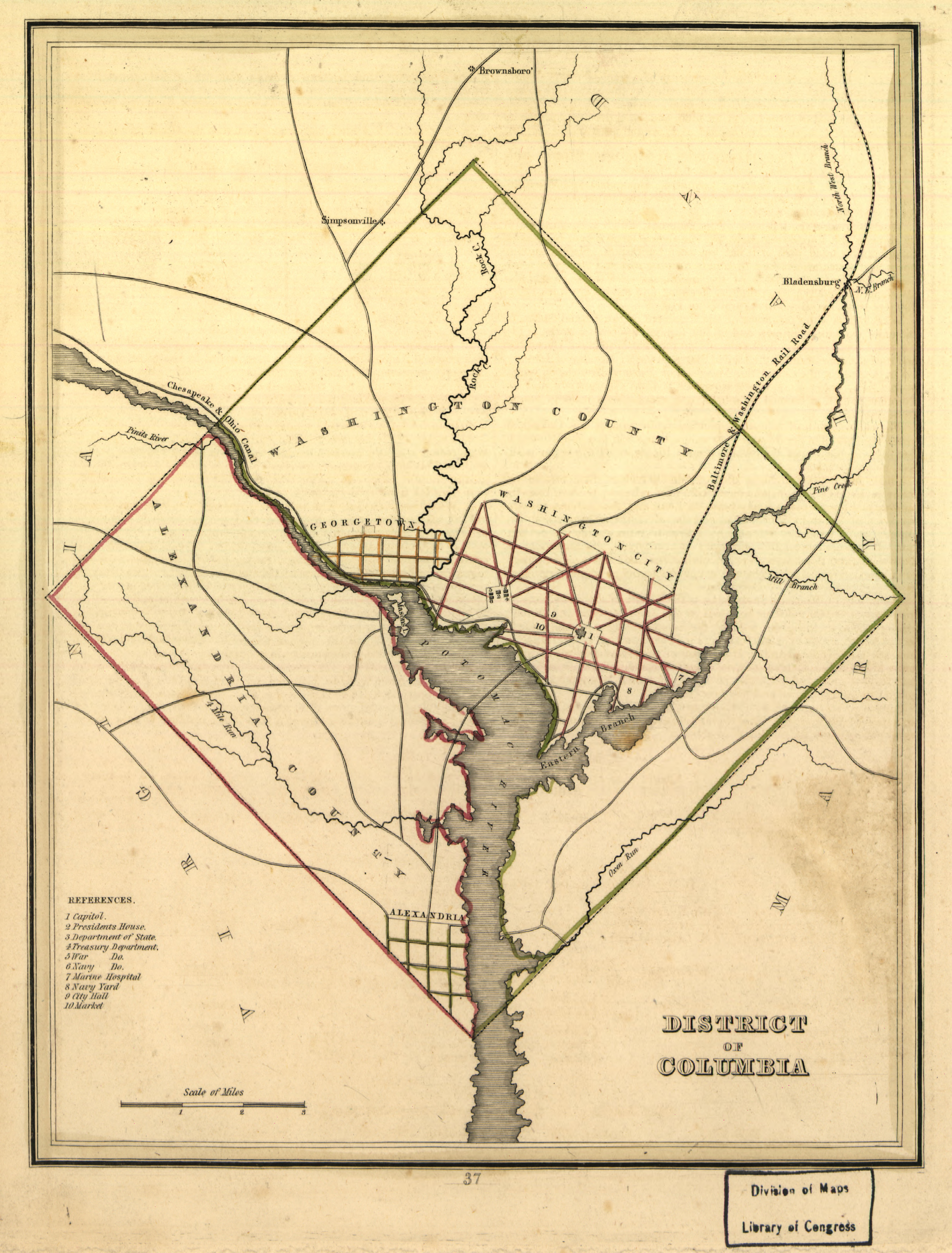
Map showing boundaries of the District of Columbia from 1800 until the retrocession in 1847; Arlington is located right below Mason's Island in what was then the District's Alexandria County

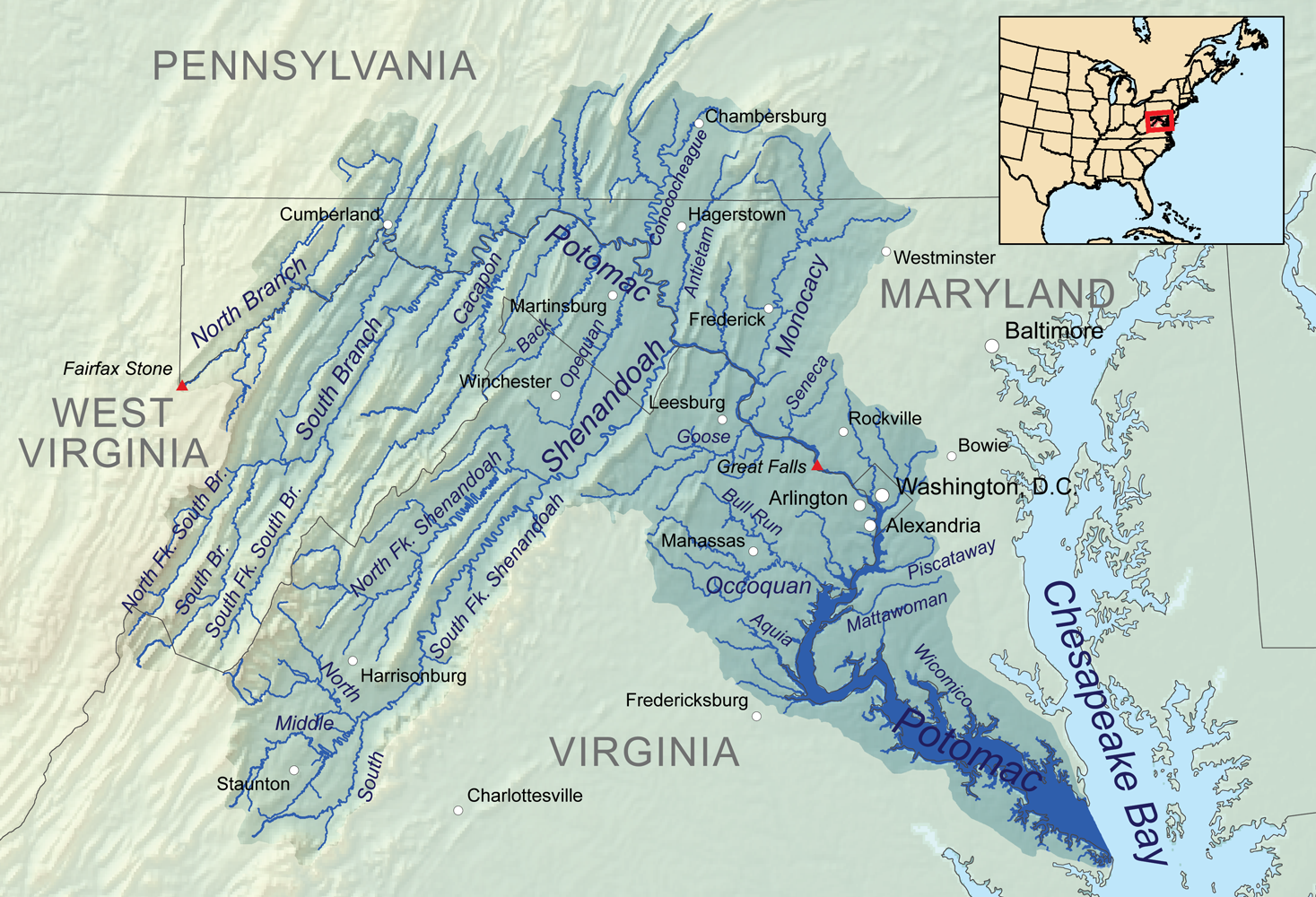
Potomac River watershed (Map: kmusser)

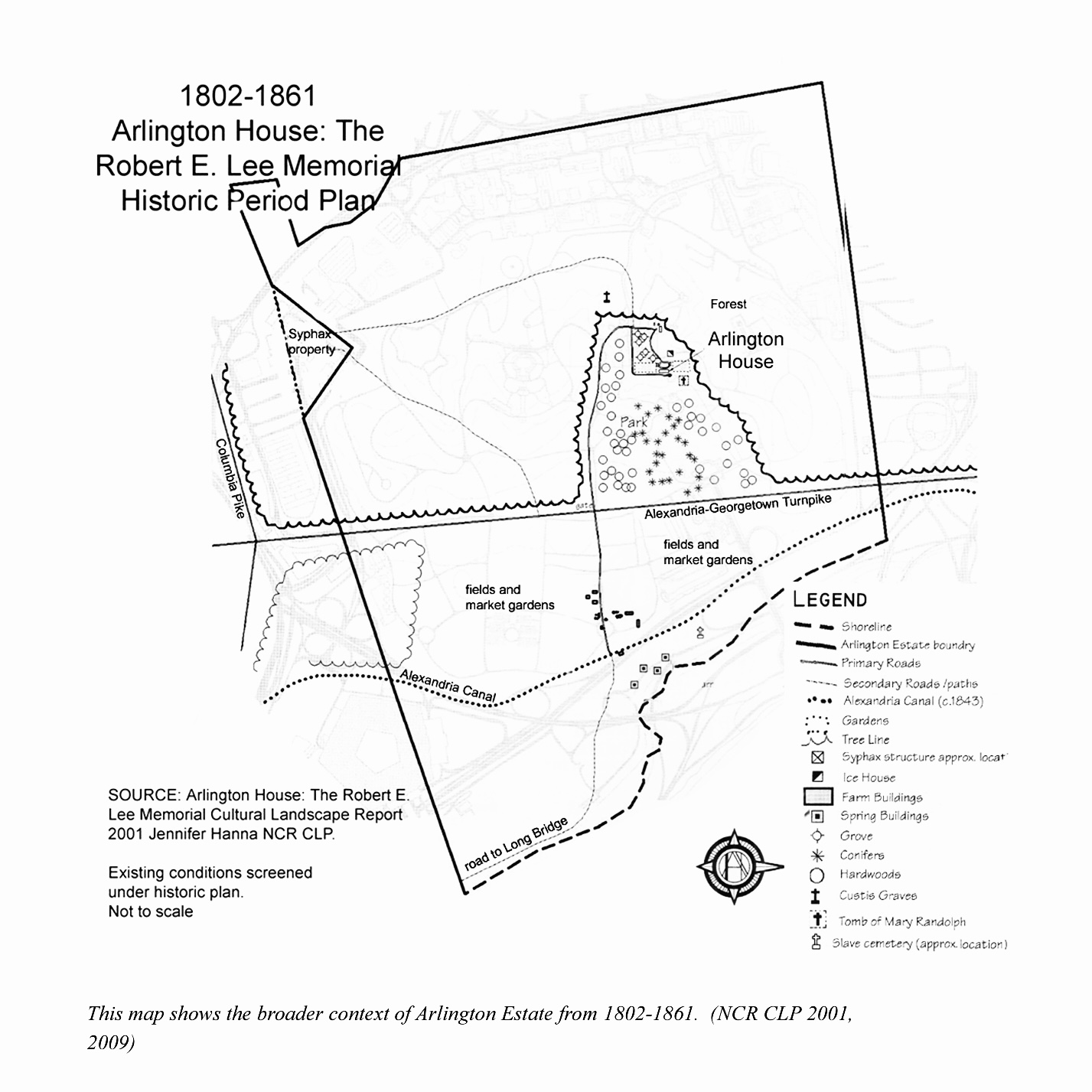
1802–1862 historic period map showing local context of Arlington Estate (Map: Jennifer Hanna, U.S. National Park Service)

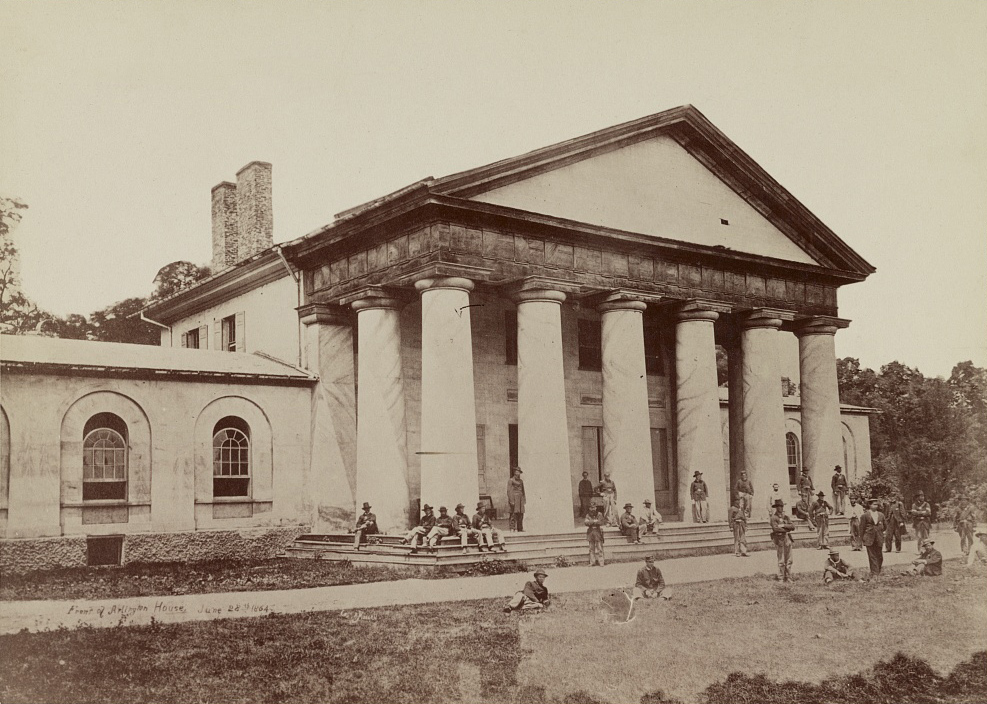
Arlington House, now known as the Custis–Lee Mansion, photographed 1864

In 1802, after Martha Washington died, ownership of Philip, his siblings, and his mother, passed to Eleanor (Nelly) Parke Custis Lewis. According to Mount Vernon historians, 17-year-old Philip Lee was then "sent to Arlington House" where he became valet to Washington's stepgrandson, George Washington Parke Custis. Arlington House, the headquarters of the 1,100-acre Arlington Plantation, "set upon the highest topographic point of the estate...designed and built between the years of 1803–1818 by George Hadfield, an English architect who is known for designing numerous classical residences as well as Treasury Building (1800) and the District of Columbia City Hall (1820). The house is notable for being the first temple-form residence built in the United States, and was purposefully set in a prominent position overlooking the growing capital city of Washington, D.C." Over the course of his life and work, one of Lee's responsibilities was "the nighttime illumination of Arlington House" for special events. While Lee lived there, he would have known the natural spring called Arlington Springs, as well as the market garden, orchards, pastures, and cropland. Over time, Philip Lee came to be called "familiarly, uncle Phil, and [was] known by that title very extensively in the vicinity" of Washington City and Arlington, D.C.

Philip married a woman named Nelly, although slave marriages were not legally recognized in Virginia. Nelly lived on another plantation, making her what was sometimes called a "broad wife." Philip and Nelly had 14 children together, the first seven of whom died in infancy. According to a 1829 profile of Lee, "Their character is also excellent. The first seven of his children followed each other in the grave; for his wife, then, and at present, the slave (with her children) of another master, buried them in quick succession, and at an early age. Phil interceded with her master, and he consented to change her sphere of toil for one more suited to her strength, since which she has never lost a child." The oldest surviving child was born in 1818.

In 1825, at the end of his tour of the United States, the Marquis de Lafayette sought American wild turkeys and opossums to take back to Europe with him. The Baltimore American Farmer newspaper published a letter written by Custis from Arlington:

Dear Sir, I have read in your last number an inquiry for opossums, to send to La Grange. I am happy to inform you that my servant Philip Lee, has procured for General Lafayette, two male and two female opossums, one of the latter with young, and that they are now on their way to Europe. The good General recognized Philip, from his likeness to his uncle Billy, an old army acquaintance, and the body servant of the commander in chief, in the war of the revolution, called Philip to him, and shook him heartily by the hand; and permit me to say, in justice to the most faithful and most attached of servants, for a period of more than 27 years, that of the thousands of "gratulating hands," the good Lafayette has not grasped the one of an honester man, or of one more respectable in his station in life, than of Philip Lee.

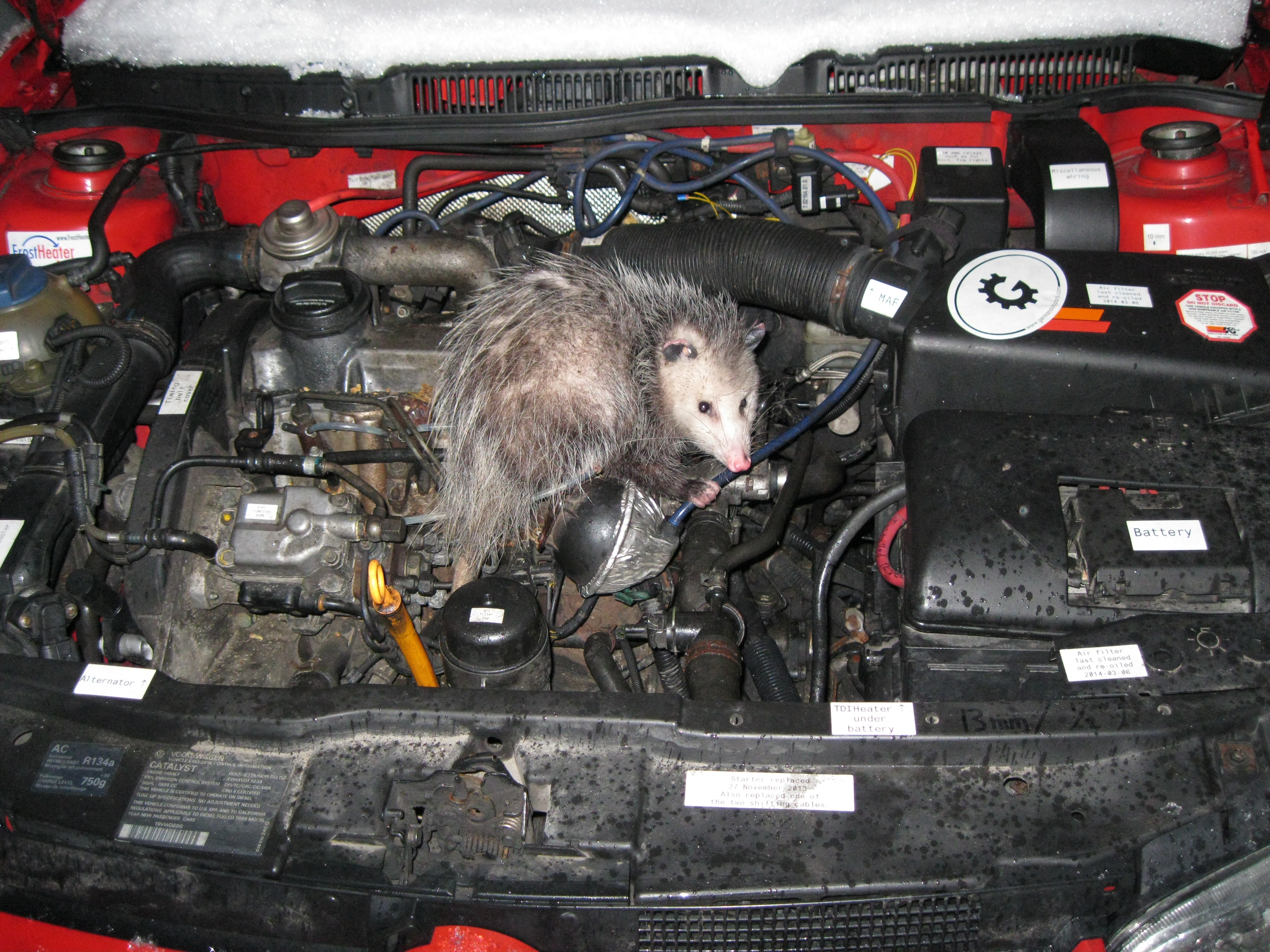
A renegade Virginia opossum (Didelphis virginiana), such as described by the American Farmer in 1825

The newspaper further reported that "One was left, one night, in the office of the American Farmer, very securely confined in a box, with her young ones, as large as middle-sized rats. In the night she decamped, with all her family in her pouch, or false belly, ascended the chimney of a three-story house, and made her escape. It had not been to communicated that her destination was to La Grange."

== Saving his wife and children ==
In 1829, Nelly's owner decided to sell her and the children to Georgia, but "Philip set out on a campaign to raise $1,000 to purchase them." Custis allowed him to do this and seems to have participated in the publicity, suggesting that Philip Lee was what has been called a "key slave," who was especially trusted by his enslaver and granted an unusual degree of both responsibility and freedom. Philip Lee himself is quoted as saying, "If you can procure the sum of $500 in New-York, you may, and I desire that you would, take them all to the north, and own them and make them serve in payment as long as your laws will allow. My wife shall bind herself there to any kind master there as long as he pleases, and my children also shall be bound; and if I never see them again in this world, I shall be happy: but how can I bear to have them sent to Georgia?" (Note: Since New York passed full and total abolition of slavery on July 4, 1827, it would have been illegal "to own them and make them serve in payment.")

The price of US$1,000 (equivalent to $30,234 in 2025) for mother and seven children was deemed "a very reasonable sum, they say, who seem to be judges in the case of 'sinews, bought and sold.'" In a column about the plight of Nelly and the children, Presbyterian minister Samuel Hanson Cox wrote:

[Lee's] character is one of extraordinary excellence; of unqualified and universal praise. For a gifted and original mind, regularity and industry, an exemplary influence among those of his own class, jointed with intelligent and consistent piety towards God and man, it in presumed that he has few superiors, of any complexion, on the globe. I have his character from his master and mistress, from Rev. Mr. Gurley, agent of the Colonization Society, and other competent judges, whose united testimony is seconded in the conviction of all others by whom he is known. I scarce dare venture to publish all that I have heard of his singular moral and social worth. Mr. Custis said, among other things, to myself, "Phil has lived with me twenty eight years, and I can say that a more faithful and conscientious man never lived."

In describing the circumstances of the Lee family, Cox wrote, "—and now to the crisis! They are all sold to a planter in the state of Georgia, and are to be removed early in the ensuing Spring unless previously redeemed. The price of their redemption is the desideratum. If it can be obtained, the present owner has humanely pledged himself (and a formal reserve in the contract authorizes the averment on his part), to give them free to their husband and father. That price is one thousand dollars. It is thought by Mr. Gurley and others, that one half can be raised in the District, and for the other $500, all his hopes under heaven is from abroad; and, I may add, is connected with this appeal. A hope that it might be easily raised by proper measures in this city, has induced me thus to present the case to the generous and the good."

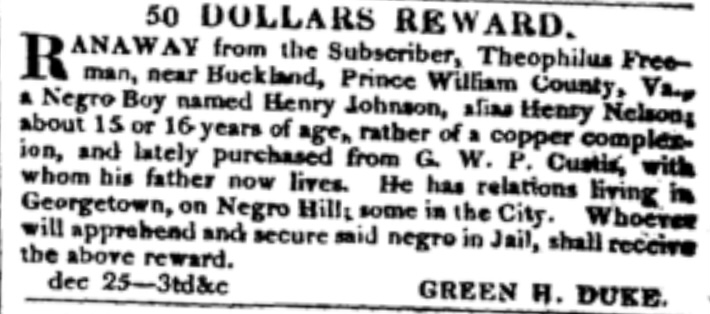
Slavery in the District of Columbia: In 1833, George Washington Parke Custis, step-grandson of George Washington and father-in-law of Robert E. Lee, sold a teenager named Henry Johnson to Theophilus Freeman, a native of Georgia. Freeman was the slave trader played by Paul Giamatti in the 2013 film 12 Years a Slave. (Washington National Intelligencer, December 28, 1833)

Mr. and Mrs. Custis could not pay the full $1,000, reportedly due to "the severe pressure of the times on the agriculturalist" but contributed some sum to the D.C. fund. People of New York who wanted to "subscribe" to the $500 freedom fund could send money in the care of New York City businessman Arthur Tappan (later an important abolitionist), public official Richard Varick, and banker Eleazar Lord. None of the pledges would be called unless the entire $1,000 was raised. The full amount was raised within weeks and the freedom of the family purchased.

Philip Lee's story was mentioned in the Genius of Universal Emancipation abolitionist newspaper in January 1830, in a regular column called "The Blacklist." The newspaper was edited by Benjamin Lundy, the column may have been written by a bold young writer named William Lloyd Garrison. The topic of the article was the increasing number of American slave ships departing from Virginia seaports and the moral consequences of family separation in American slavery.

Ten thousand from the single port of Norfolk! The above facts forcibly remind me of the case of Philip Lee, the son of Washington's servant, and the bursting of his grief in anticipation of that time, which, but for the interposition of friends, would have separated him forever from his wife and seven beloved children...Ten thousand, in the technics of the country, 'picked hands,' selected one here and another there! Who can estimate the number of families thus broken up? One day the degraded, yet comparatively happy slave is surrounded by a family equally degraded and happy. The next, he is on his way to the Georgia market, his children to Tennessee, and his wife to New-Orleans. Thus separated, the hammer of the auctioneer soon fixes their destinies for life. I say, think of the evils consequent on this trade. Think too of its guilt: But charge not this guilt exclusively upon our brethren at the south. No; you are a criminal too.

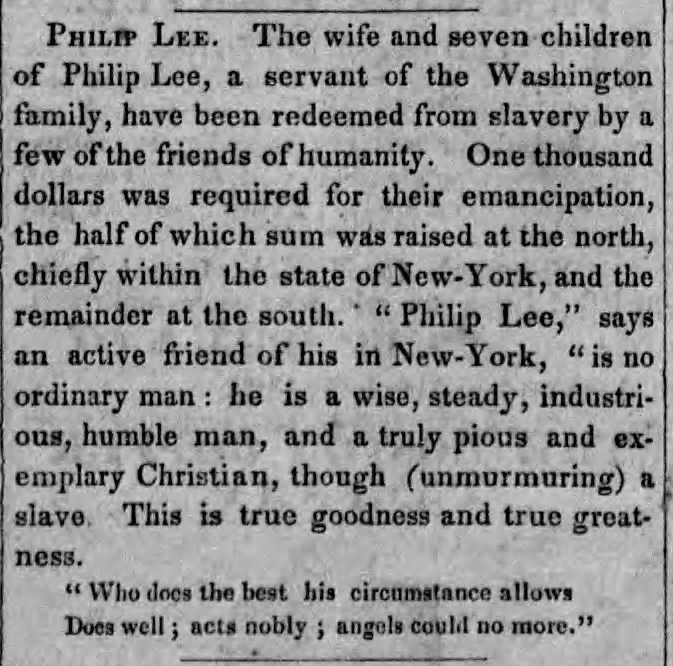
"PHILIP LEE" Journal of the Times, Bennington, Vermont, April 22, 1829

== Later life ==
On February 17, 1832, G. W. Custis wrote from Arlington House that he was sending to New York some clothes and a tent that had been used by Washington for the upcoming celebration of Washington's Birthday, stating, "My old favorite body servant, Philip Lee, will accompany the reliques. Philip is the nephew of Washington's celebrated revolutionary follower, Will Lee. Philip is a highly intelligent, nay, talented man, of gentlemanly manner, and worthy of every confidence and consideration. He will not be my slave much longer. He has been my friend for two and thirty years." The tent in question was huge, required three people to set up, was decorated in "laurels and honeysuckle," and on this occasion was "pitched in front of City Hall by the First Division of the New York State Artillery unit."

Seven months later, there had apparently been no progress on Custis' claim that Lee "would not be my slave much longer." In September 1832, Custis' wife Mary Lee (Molly) Fitzhugh Lee wrote him, "Philip is very unhappy...He wishes to hear from you, from family, and to know what are the wishes of his master. He evinces no disposition, that I can see to do wrong in any sense...I consider Philip the greatest sufferer...of his own responsibility and agency...All I want is that right should be done to all parties…If you can come to a decision about that, my dear husband, it ought not to be delayed."

It is unknown whether Philip Lee was ever emancipated. His date and place of death are also unknown.

== See also ==
- Category:People who were enslaved by George Washington
- Maria Carter Syphax – Matriarch of the Syphax family, daughter of Custis by an enslaved woman Arianna Carter
- Shadow family and children of the plantation
- Lee family – American political family
- First Families of Virginia
- History of slavery in Virginia
- Slave trade in the United States

== Sources ==
- n.a. (2009). "Arlington House, The Robert E. Lee Memorial, Cultural Landscapes Inventory" (PDF). U.S. National Park Service.
- Clark, Charles S. (2021). George Washington Parke Custis: A Rarefied Life in America's First Family. Afterword by Matthew Penrod. Jefferson, North Carolina: McFarland & Company, Inc. ISBN 978-1-4766-8662-2. LCCN 2021033676. OCLC 1430337127.
- Good, Cassandra (2020). "Washington Family Fortune: Lineage and Capital in Nineteenth-Century America". Early American Studies. 18 (1): 90–133. ISSN 1543-4273. JSTOR 26898693.
- Thompson, Mary V. (2022). ""She Did Not Come Up to 'Ole Mistis' in Mammy's Eyes!": Relationships between the Women, Enslaved and Free, of Mount Vernon". In Lewis, Charlene M. Boyer; Boudreau, George W. (eds.). Women in George Washington's World. University of Virginia Press. doi:10.2307/j.ctv3596wpg. ISBN 978-0-8139-4745-7. JSTOR j.ctv3596wpg. LCCN 2022007613. OCLC 1302330846.
- Williams, Martha Curtis (2023). Breton, Douglas (ed.). "The Arlington Journals of Martha Custis Williams" (PDF). U.S. National Park Service.
