= John B. Syphax =

American politician (1838–1916)

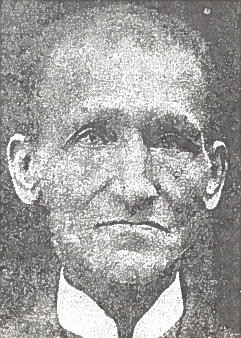
- Undated picture of John B. Syphax

Member of the Virginia House of Delegates for Alexandria City and Alexandria
- In office January 1, 1874 – March 31, 1875 Serving with Israel C. O'Neal
- Preceded by: S. Chapman Neale and Allen Pearce
- Succeeded by: William H. Fowle and George L. Simpson

Personal details
- Born: John Bryce Syphax c. 1838
- Died: September 8, 1916 (aged 77–78) Brooklyn, New York, U.S.
- Resting place: Cypress Hill Cemetery; Brooklyn, New York, U.S.
- Parents: Charles Syphax (father); Maria Carter Syphax (mother)
- Relatives: William Syphax (brother); George Washington Parke Custis (grandfather); Martha Custis Washington (great-great-grandmother)
- Occupation: Politician

John Bryce Syphax (c. 1838 – September 8, 1916) was an African-American politician during the Reconstruction era. Born free in Virginia, he served as a justice of the peace of the Arlington Magisterial Board. He served as a member of the Virginia House of Delegates, serving from 1874 to 1875. Later in life he moved to New York City, where he settled in Brooklyn.

== Life ==
Syphax was a son of Charles Syphax and Maria Carter Syphax. His mother was the natural daughter of an enslaved woman, Ariana Carter, and white planter George Washington Parke Custis. Custis was the only grandson of First Lady Martha Washington, by her first marriage. Custis permitted his mixed-race daughter and her chosen spouse, Charles Syphax, to marry at his mansion of Arlington in 1821.

In addition, Custis arranged in 1826 for Maria Syphax and her (then) two children to be freed by selling them to a Quaker apothecary. Because children's status was determined by that of the mother, this ensured that the remainder of the Syphax children were born free. In addition, he granted Maria 17 acres at his Arlington estate, where she and her family could live. She stayed there for the remainder of her life.

Among Syphax's siblings was his older brother William Syphax, who became active in Washington, DC, working for the Department of Interior and later on the school board for black schools.

John Syphax became active in politics after the Civil War. He was appointed as a justice of the peace of the Arlington Magisterial Board. Later, he was elected to the Virginia Assembly, serving two terms representing Alexandria and Alexandria County, from January 1, 1874, to March 31, 1875, alongside J. C. O'Neal.

In the late 19th century, Syphax migrated north to New York. He died in Brooklyn, New York, on September 8, 1916, and was buried in Cypress Hill Cemetery in that city.

== See also ==
- African American officeholders from the end of the Civil War until before 1900
