= Syphax family =

African-American family

Syphax
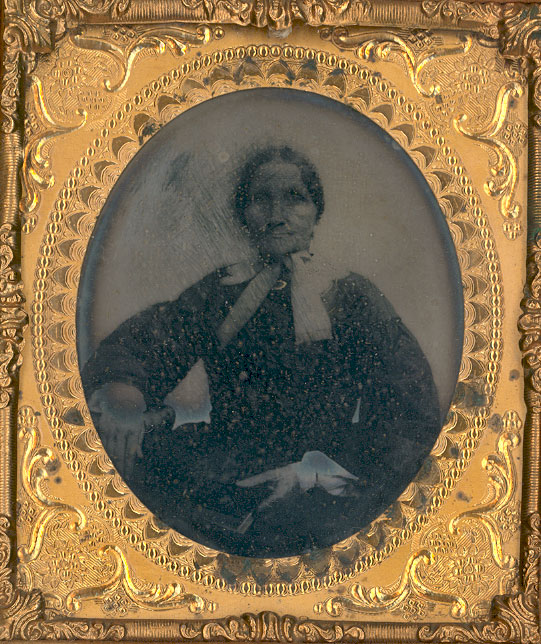
- Mariah Carter Syphax was the matriarch of the family.
- Parent house: Dandridge family Calvert family Custis family
- Current region: America
- Origin: Virginia
- Founded: 1825; 201 years ago
- Founder: Charles Syphax; Mariah Carter Custis Syphax
- Connected families: McKee family Yamamoto family
- Estate: Arlington

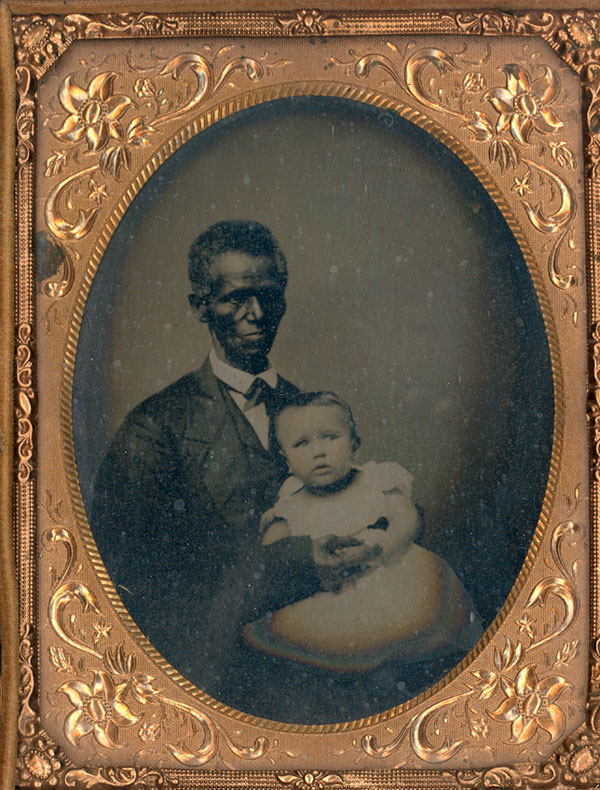
Charles Syphax and his grandson William B. Syphax

The Syphax family is a prominent American family of the District of Columbia area; as a part of the African-American upper class, the family is descended from Charles Syphax and Mariah Carter Syphax, both of whom were enslaved at Arlington House. Mariah was the illegitimate daughter of an enslaved woman and George Washington Parke Custis, the grandson of First Lady Martha Washington.

== History ==
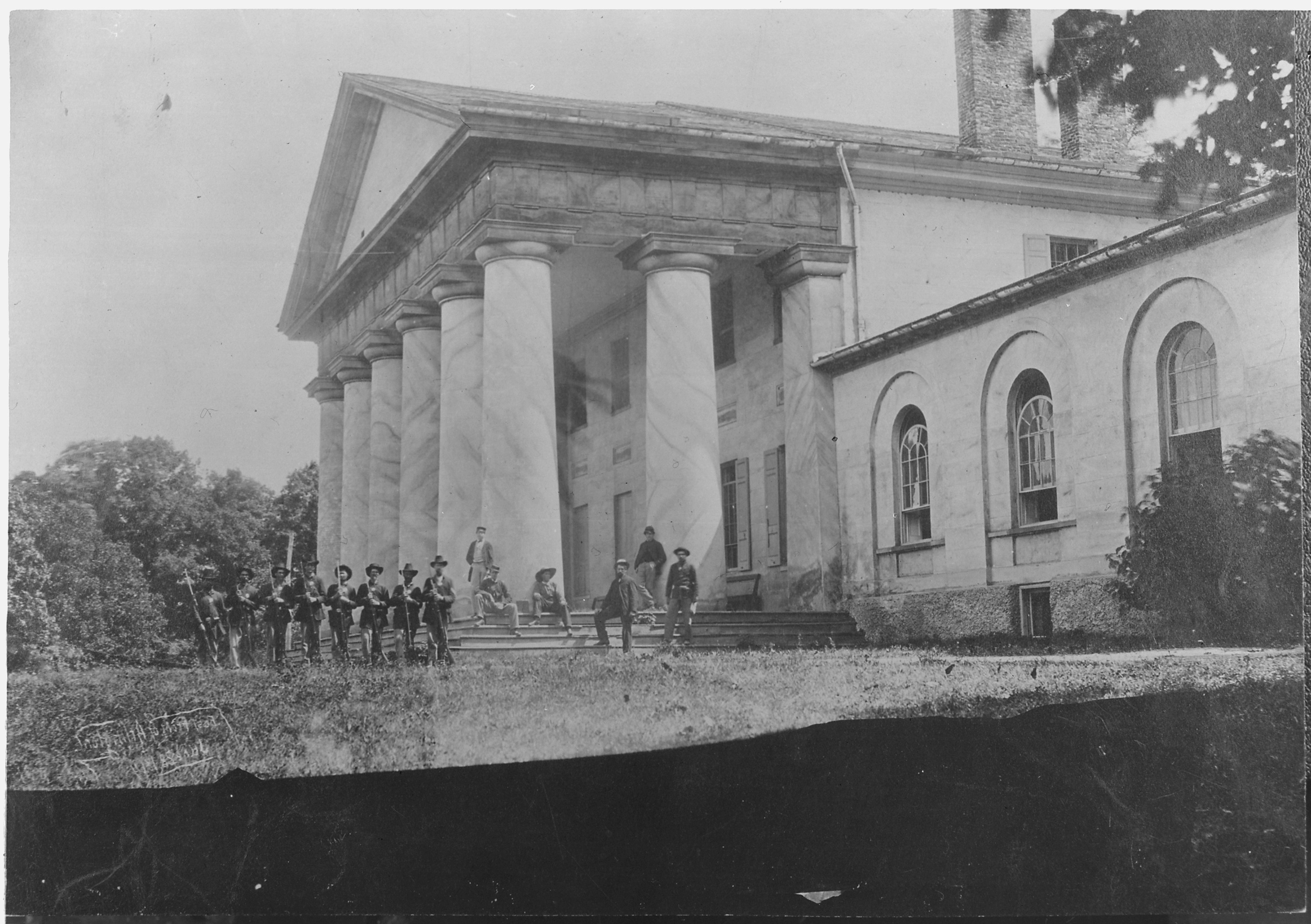
East front of Arlington Mansion in 1864. Charles and Mariah were married in the mansion in 1826.

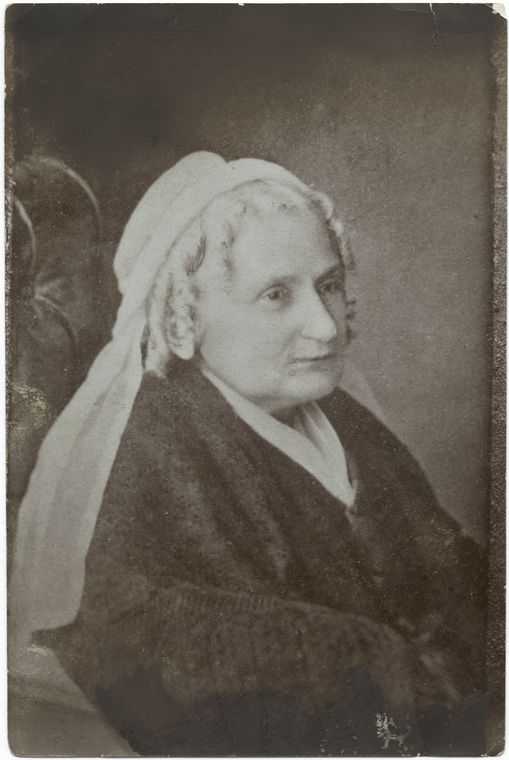
Mary Custis Lee (1808–1873), Mariah's half-sister.

The family became part of the free people of color in Washington, D.C., before the Civil War. Maria (Mariah) Carter was born into slavery, the mixed-race daughter of planter George Washington Parke Custis (1781–1857), the only grandson of Martha Washington through her first marriage. Mariah's mother was Ariana Carter, one of Custis's house slaves.

Considered part of the elite of African-American society, the Syphax family gained early advantages by their being freed before the war, and by Mariah Syphax being granted 17 acres of land at Arlington by her father Custis. That land later was acquired by the government to become part of Arlington National Cemetery.

When Mariah Carter asked her father for permission to marry Charles Syphax, one of his slaves, he allowed them the unusual benefit of marrying in his Arlington mansion. Later that year, he granted Mariah seventeen acres of his Arlington estate. (Note: The Arlington property remained in the Syphax family until the 1940s, when the Federal government asked the Syphax family to exchange it for land elsewhere in the district to accommodate expansion of Arlington National Cemetery. The Syphax family cemetery that had been on the land was transferred to the Lincoln Memorial Cemetery as part of the exchange.) Mary Custis (1808–1873), Mariah's white half-sister, married Robert E. Lee (1807–1870), who became a Confederate general when the Civil War broke out.

Mariah and Charles had ten children, several of whom achieved important political positions from the 1850s onward.

Several of the Syphax descendants became Catholics.

== Notable members ==
- William Syphax: The eldest son of Charles and Mariah, William gained positions in the Interior Department and as first African-American president of the School Board for Black schools in the District of Columbia. After his family's property was confiscated following the Civil War, he successfully petitioned for it to be restored to them by way of a relief Act of Congress. The head of the group that founded the first high school for African Americans, William "was described as a man of 'dauntless courage and unwavering integrity' who 'dared to demand what was due his race, fearing no man regardless of position or color.'"
- John B. Syphax: A son of Charles and Mariah, John was elected to the Virginia House of Delegates during the Reconstruction era.
- Douglas Syphax: Born in 1842, Douglas became one of the few black sergeants in the United States Colored Troops. After the war, he moved from Virginia to Philadelphia, Pennsylvania, where he went into real estate.
- Theophilus John Syphax: A son of the preceding, T. John Syphax passed as white beginning at about 20 to gain more opportunities and evade racial discrimination, under the assumed name of Theophilus John McKee.
- Charles Sumner Syphax: A prominent mathematician, Charles served as a dean of Howard University.
- Charles Sumner Syphax II: A son of the preceding, Charles II worked as a physician after graduating from the University of Michigan in 1924.
- Charles Sumner Syphax III: A son of the preceding, Charles III became one of the earliest African-American developers in Detroit.
- Mary Gibson Hundley: An educator and civil rights activist, Mary won a precedent-establishing case against restrictive residential covenants in the Jim Crow era.
- Julian Dixon: A U.S. congressman, Julian sponsored the attempt to impeach Ronald Reagan in the wake of the U.S. government's invasion of Grenada.
- Evelyn Reid Syphax: An educator who was chair of the Arlington Public Schools Board.
- Mary Syphax Gibson: An educator who was the first black Member of the Washington DC School Board.
- Burke Syphax: A surgeon who led the Howard University Hospital Department of Surgery and was one of the first black people to become Board Certified in Surgery.
- Edward C. Gleed: A Buffalo Soldier and Tuskegee Airman, Edward was one of segregated America's most prominent Black military servicemen.

== See also ==
- Ashworth family
- Bustill family
- Chavis family
- Gibson family (Virginia)
- McGill family
- Quander family
- Vaughan family

== Sources ==
- Graham, Lawrence Otis (1999-12-22). Our Kind of People: Inside America's Black Upper Class. HarperCollins. p. 8. ISBN 978-0-06-098438-0.
- Graham, Lawrence Otis (2007-07-03). The Senator and the Socialite: The True Story of America's First Black Dynasty. HarperCollins. p. 181. ISBN 978-0-06-098513-4.
