= Margaret Thomas (domestic worker) =

African American domestic worker

Margaret Thomas also known as Margaret Thomas Lee was a free Black woman and domestic worker who was employed by George Washington.

Thomas first joined Washington at his Cambridge, Massachusetts headquarters in February 1776. She traveled with Washington and was present at military encampments during the American Revolutionary War where she mended clothes and linens and worked as a laundress within Washington's household.

Thomas worked for Washington at Valley Forge from 1777 to 1778.

Thomas met William Lee, George Washington's enslaved valet, during her time with the General. The couple married in Philadelphia. After the war, Lee returned to Mount Vernon with Washington and Thomas remained in Philadelphia where she lived with Washington's former cooks, Hannah and Isaac Till.

Virginia did not recognize marriages of enslaved people. Lee petitioned Washington to allow Thomas to join him and Washington agreed. It is unclear if Thomas ever made it to Mount Vernon.
