= William Lee (valet) =

American slave and valet of George Washington

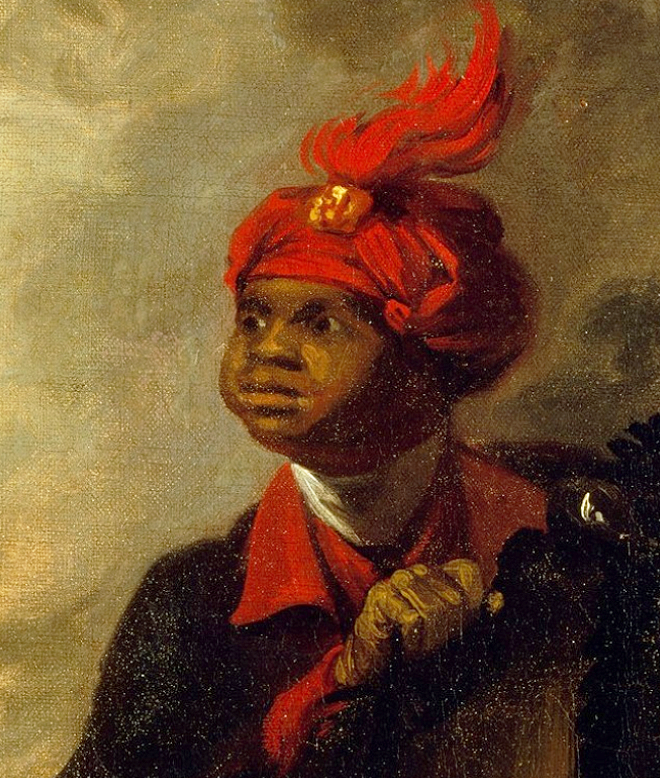
- Portrait by John Trumbull, 1780
- Born: c. 1750
- Died: 1810 (aged 59–60)
- Other names: Will Lee, Billy Lee
- Occupations: Slave and manservant
- Known for: Being George Washington's personal manservant.

William Lee (c. 1750 – 1810) was an American slave and personal assistant of George Washington. He was the only one of Washington's slaves who was freed immediately by Washington's will. With his service by Washington's side throughout the American Revolutionary War and occasional depiction next to Washington in paintings, Lee was one of the most publicized African Americans of his time.

== Early life ==
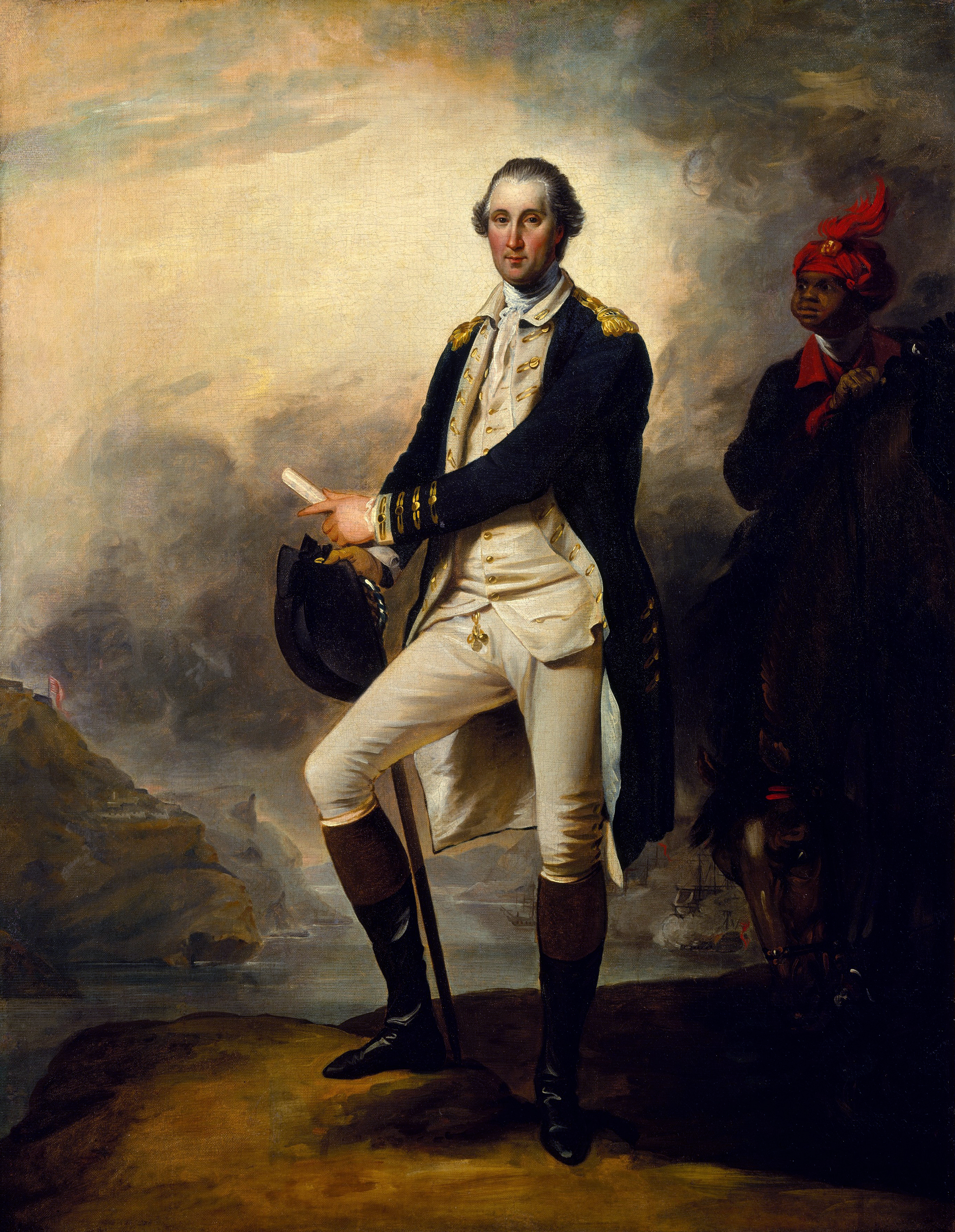
The man holding the horse in John Trumbull's George Washington, painted in London in 1780, possibly represents Lee and was painted from memory five years after Trumbull served on Washington's staff.

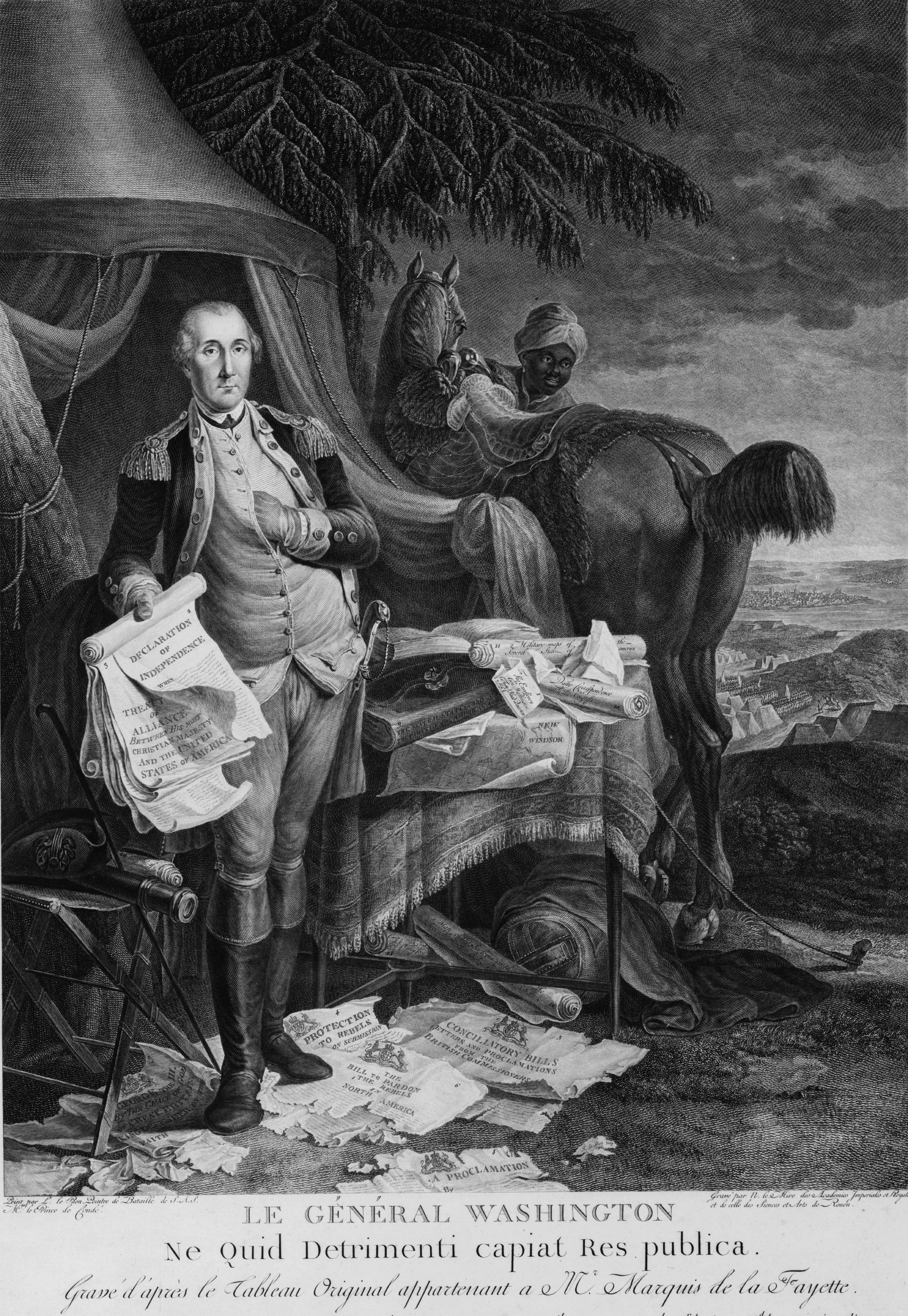
A French engraving, circa 1780, showing General Washington holding the Declaration of Independence. The black man with the horse is not identified but may represent Lee.

Born c. 1750, Lee was purchased on May 27, 1768, when he was just a teenager, by George Washington, as described in Washington's account book as Mulatto Will, from the estate of the late Colonel John Lee of Westmoreland County, Virginia, for sixty-one pounds and fifteen shillings. William kept the surname "Lee" from his previous owner. Also purchased at the time was William's brother Frank as well as two other people. Washington paid high prices for William and Frank, as they were to be household slaves, rather than field slaves. William and Frank were often chosen to serve as domestic servants. Frank became Washington's butler at Mount Vernon, and William served in a variety of roles, including Washington's valet or manservant. As the valet, Lee performed chores such as brushing Washington's long hair and tying it behind his head.

== Huntsman ==
Washington was a frequent fox hunter, and Lee became his huntsman and was in charge of the hounds, a role that required expert horsemanship and blowing horn calls, or signals, on a hunting horn. In his memoirs, Washington's step-grandson, George Washington Parke Custis, described Lee during a hunt:

Will, the huntsman, better known in Revolutionary lore as Billy, rode a horse called Chinkling, a surprising leaper, and made very much like its rider, low, but sturdy, and of great bone and muscle. Will had but one order, which was to keep with the hounds; and, mounted on Chinkling, a French horn at his back, throwing himself almost at length on the animal, with his spur in flank, this fearless horseman would rush, at full speed, through brake or tangled wood, in a style at which modern huntsmen would stand aghast.

The hunting horn aspect of William Lee's life and other Huntsmen of African and Creole descent are largely undocumented, but they are acknowledged as "exploited for the benefit of their indentures and enslavers."

== Revolutionary War ==
Before the Revolutionary War, Lee often traveled with Washington to the House of Burgesses in Williamsburg, or on journeys such as a surveying expedition to the Ohio Valley in 1770 and to the First Continental Congress in Philadelphia in 1774. Lee served at Washington's side throughout the eight years of the Revolutionary War, including the winter at Valley Forge and at the siege of Yorktown.

According to the historian Fritz Hirschfeld, Lee "rode alongside Washington in the thick of battle, ready to hand over to the general a spare horse or his telescope or whatever else might be needed."

== Later life ==
Lee's wife was Margaret Thomas Lee, a free African-American from Philadelphia who had worked as a servant in Washington's headquarters during the war. Slave marriages were not recognized by Virginian law, but in 1784, at the couple's request, Washington tried to arrange having Margaret move to Mount Vernon to live with her husband. Whether or not she ever came to Mount Vernon is unknown.

In 1785, Lee injured a knee on an expedition for Washington. Three years later, while he went to the post office in Alexandria, he fell and injured his other knee, which rendered him seriously disabled. After Washington was elected president in 1789, Lee attempted to make the journey to New York City for Washington's first inauguration but had to be left in Philadelphia for medical treatment. He was attended by several physicians, who made a steel brace for his knee, which allowed him to join Washington's presidential household. Frank's nephew, Christopher Sheels, assisted Lee in New York City and took over Lee's duties in 1790 at the Philadelphia President's House.

Even after Washington's 1797 retirement, Lee's disabilities prevented him from continuing his previous duties, and he spent the last years of his life as a shoemaker at Mount Vernon and struggled with alcoholism. The American Revolutionary War veterans who visited Mount Vernon often stopped to reminisce with Lee about the war.

When Washington died in 1799, he freed Lee in his will and cited "his faithful services during the Revolutionary War." Lee was the only one of Washington's 124 slaves to be freed outright in his will. According to the terms of Washington's will, his remaining slaves were to be freed upon the death of his wife, Martha Washington. (Note: Another 153 slaves living at Mount Vernon were the property of Martha's first husband's estate and so could not be freed by Washington.) Lee was given a pension of thirty dollars a year for the rest of his life and the option to remain at Mount Vernon, which he chose; he was buried there.

== Legacy ==
"If Billy Lee had been a white man," wrote the historian Fritz Hirschfeld, "he would have had an honored place in American history because of his close proximity to George Washington during the most exciting periods of his career. But because he was a black servant, a humble slave, he has been virtually ignored by both black and white historians and biographers."

== Portrayals ==
- Lee is portrayed by Ron Canada in the 1984 CBS miniseries George Washington.
- Lee is portrayed by Gentry White in the AMC series Turn: Washington's Spies (2014–2017). He is featured prominently in season-2 episode "Valley Forge".
- Hainsley Lloyd Bennett portrays Lee in the 2020 miniseries Washington.
- Lee is portrayed by actor Quinton Castle in the 2025 docudrama The American Miracle: Our Nation Is No Accident and also in the movie Elijah and George: A Revolutionary Tale.

== See also ==
- Philip Lee (valet), Will Lee's nephew
- List of enslaved people of Mount Vernon
- Samuel Osgood House – First Presidential Mansion.
- Alexander Macomb House – Second Presidential Mansion.
- List of slaves

== Bibliography ==
- Egerton, Douglas. Death or Liberty: African Americans and Revolutionary America. New York: Oxford University Press, 2009.
- Hirschfeld, Fritz. George Washington and Slavery: A Documentary Portrayal. University of Missouri Press, 1997.
- Wiencek, Henry. An Imperfect God: George Washington, His Slaves, and the Creation of America. New York: Farrar, Straus and Giroux, 2003.
