= William Syphax =

American community leader and educator (died 1891)

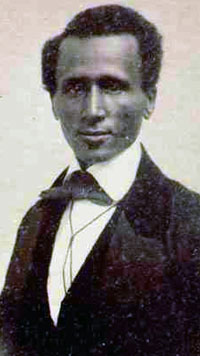
- Born: c. 1825; Alexandria County, Virginia, U.S.
- Died: June 15, 1891; Washington, D.C., U.S.
- Resting place: Columbian Harmony Cemetery (defunct)
- Occupations: Educator; community leader
- Political party: Republican
- Parents: Charles Syphax (father); Maria Carter Syphax (mother)
- Relatives: John B. Syphax (brother); George Washington Parke Custis (grandfather); Martha Custis Washington (great-great-grandmother)

William Syphax (c. 1825 — June 15, 1891) was born into slavery but manumitted when he was about one year old, along with his mother Maria Carter Syphax and sister. As a young man, he became a U.S. government civil servant in Republican administrations, and built a network in the capital city.

He gained passage of a relief bill in Congress in 1866 to restore 17 acres of land his mother had received from her father, planter George Washington Parke Custis, the only grandson of the late First Lady Martha Washington. After the Civil War, Syphax served as the first president of the Board of Trustees of Colored Schools of Washington and Georgetown in Washington, D.C.

== Life and career ==
Syphax was born into slavery in Alexandria County, Virginia, about 1825. His mother was Maria Carter, an enslaved mixed-race woman who was the daughter of Ariana, a slave, and planter George Washington Parke Custis. He owned the plantation known as Arlington, where Maria and her mother Ariana lived and worked. (Custis was the only grandson of Martha Custis Washington, by her first marriage, and the step-grandson and adopted son of George Washington). Syphax's father was Charles Syphax, a slave at Mount Vernon who had overseen construction of Arlington House. By the mid-1820s Charles had been taken by Custis to Arlington when he took over the property. Custis allowed Maria and Charles to marry in the house. His brother was John B. Syphax, member of the Virginia House of Delegates.

In 1826 Custis sold Maria Syphax, her eldest child Elinor, and William to a Quaker living in Alexandria, Virginia, perhaps so that the man could manumit Maria and her two children. In 1826 Custis gave Maria a bequest of 17 acres of land from the south part of the Arlington estate. (Note: The date of the slave sale can be determined because Smithsonian Magazine says that it occurred shortly before George Washington Parke Custis gave Maria Syphax 17 acres of land taken from the Arlington estate.) Charles Syphax was held as a slave until freed in 1857 by his next master, Robert E. Lee, under the terms of the George W. P. Custis will.

With his family, William Syphax settled in the District of Columbia when he was 11 years old. The city had a large community of free people of color, and the Syphaxes became part of the elite. As a young man, Syphax began working for the United States Department of the Interior in 1851. He also built connections throughout the city.

During the American Civil War, the Union confiscated Maria Syphax's property when it confiscated the remainder of the Arlington property. Custis had not legally documented this transfer of land to Maria Syphax (state law may have prohibited it). For a time the Union forces used it as a refuge for freedmen. William Syphax used his connections in Washington, DC to ensure his mother regained control of her property, through a relief bill enacted by Congress in 1866.

After the war, on July 8, 1868, Syphax was appointed to the Board of Trustees of Colored Schools, the school board that oversaw and ran the segregated public schools for students of color in the District of Columbia. The federal government operated the schools. Although they were segregated, black and white teachers were paid equally. Syphax was the second African American appointed to the three-man board (the first being Alfred Jones in 1867); Syphax was the board's first president. He supported the notion of a unified public school system and equal educational standards. He oversaw the construction of the Charles Sumner School and the Thaddeus Stevens School. In 1870, Syphax organized The Preparatory High School for Colored Youth, later named Dunbar High School, a prestigious academic high school.

=== Death ===
Syphax died of undisclosed causes at his home at 1641 P Street NW on June 15, 1891. He was interred at Columbian Harmony Cemetery in Washington, D.C.

== Legacy ==
He is the namesake of William Syphax School (historical) at 1322 Half Street, SW in Washington, D.C. In November 2020, District of Columbia Public Schools announced that William Syphax was one of seven finalists to serve as a replacement name for Woodrow Wilson High School in Washington, D.C.

== Additional reading ==
- Abbott, Dorothea E. (October 1984). "The Land of Maria Syphax and the Abbey Mausoleum" (PDF). Arlington Historical Magazine: 64–79.
- Thompson, Mary V. (2019). The only unavoidable subject of regret: George Washington, slavery, and the enslaved community at Mount Vernon. Charlottesville. p. 146. ISBN 978-0-8139-4185-1. OCLC 1137379215.
- "The Syphax Family - Arlington House, The Robert E. Lee Memorial (U.S. National Park Service)". www.nps.gov.
- "Syphax Family". George Washington's Mount Vernon.
- "Arlington's Oldest Families - Page 3 of 4". Arlington Magazine. March 1, 2018.
- "Family Tree: From George Washington To The Black Heritage Museum Of Arlington". WAMU.
- "Remembering Freedman's Village". www.army.mil. February 28, 2012.
- "Syphax Family history ties to Freedman's Village". www.army.mil. February 28, 2012.
- "Freedman's Village - Arlington House, The Robert E. Lee Memorial (U.S. National Park Service)". www.nps.gov.
- "Nancy Syphax – Life and Legacy". WHHA (en-US).
