= Arianna Carter =

Slave at Mount Vernon

- Born: c. 1770
- Occupation: Maid
- Children: Maria

Arianna Carter was born around 1770 and brought to Mount Vernon by Martha Custis, who married George Washington in 1759. Martha Custis brought her 84 slaves which she had acquired from a previous marriage with her to Washington's Mount Vernon Estate. Arianna Carter was an enslaved maid for the estate. George and Martha had no kids together, but Washington adopted Eleanor Parke Custis and George Washington Parke Custis who went by “Wash” and “Nelly”. George Washington Parke Custis and Mary Fitzhugh married in 1804 They had 4 children, but only one of them would survive into her adult life. George Parke Custis also had other children with slaves that Martha had brought from her previous marriage. George Washington Parke Custis had a child with Arianna Carter, in 1803 who was named Maria Carter.

== Family & background ==
Martha Custis and George Washington married on January 6, 1759. Martha Custis had a prior marriage to which she was widowed before marrying George Washington. George Washington adopted Martha's grandchildren Eleanor Parke Custis and George Washington Parke Custis, as his own children and raised them on his estate in Mount Vernon from when they were in their young teens. George Washington Parke Custis married Mary Fitzhugh in 1804 and they went on to have 4 children, only their daughter Mary Ann Rudolph Custis would make it to be an adult. George Washington Parke Custis had another daughter with one of Martha and George Washington's enslaved house maids, Arianna Carter in 1803 before he married Mary. Their daughter's name is Maria Carter. George Washington Parke Custis always had what some considered a soft spot for Maria as she was allowed to marry in the Arlington house in 1821 to Charles Syphax. Maria and Charles would go on to have 10 children.
