= Maria Carter Syphax =

Matriarch of the Syphax family

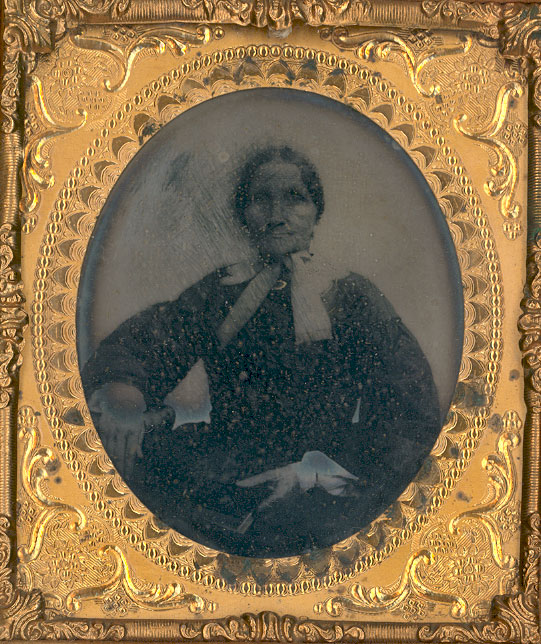
- Syphax, c. 1870
- Born: 1803
- Died: 1886 (aged 82-83)
- Occupation: Maid
- Spouse: Charles Syphax (m. 1821; died 1869)
- Children: 10, including William and John
- Parent(s): George Washington Parke Custis; Arianna Carter
- Relatives: Mary Anna Custis (half-sister) Martha Washington (great-grandmother)

Maria Carter Syphax, otherwise spelled Mariah (1803 – 1886), was the matriarch of the Syphax family, a prominent family of African Americans in the greater Washington, D.C., area who became civic leaders, civil servants, and educators. She was born into slavery as Maria Carter, daughter of the enslaved (and later freed) maid, Arianna Carter Syphax. She was the illegitimate daughter of George Washington Parke Custis who was the grandson of Martha Dandridge Custis Washington through her first marriage. Syphax was a great-granddaughter of First Lady Martha Washington.

Maria Syphax was manumitted by Custis in 1826, along with her two children, and that year he granted her 17 acres of his Arlington plantation. He later bequeathed freedom by his will for her husband Charles Syphax. The family was established as landowning free people of color before the Civil War. Although some of her land was initially confiscated with that of Arlington, her son William Syphax was able to use his connections and gain passage of a relief bill by Congress to return it to her. Her descendants continued to live in the Washington, D.C., area, working as leaders in many civic roles.

== Early life ==
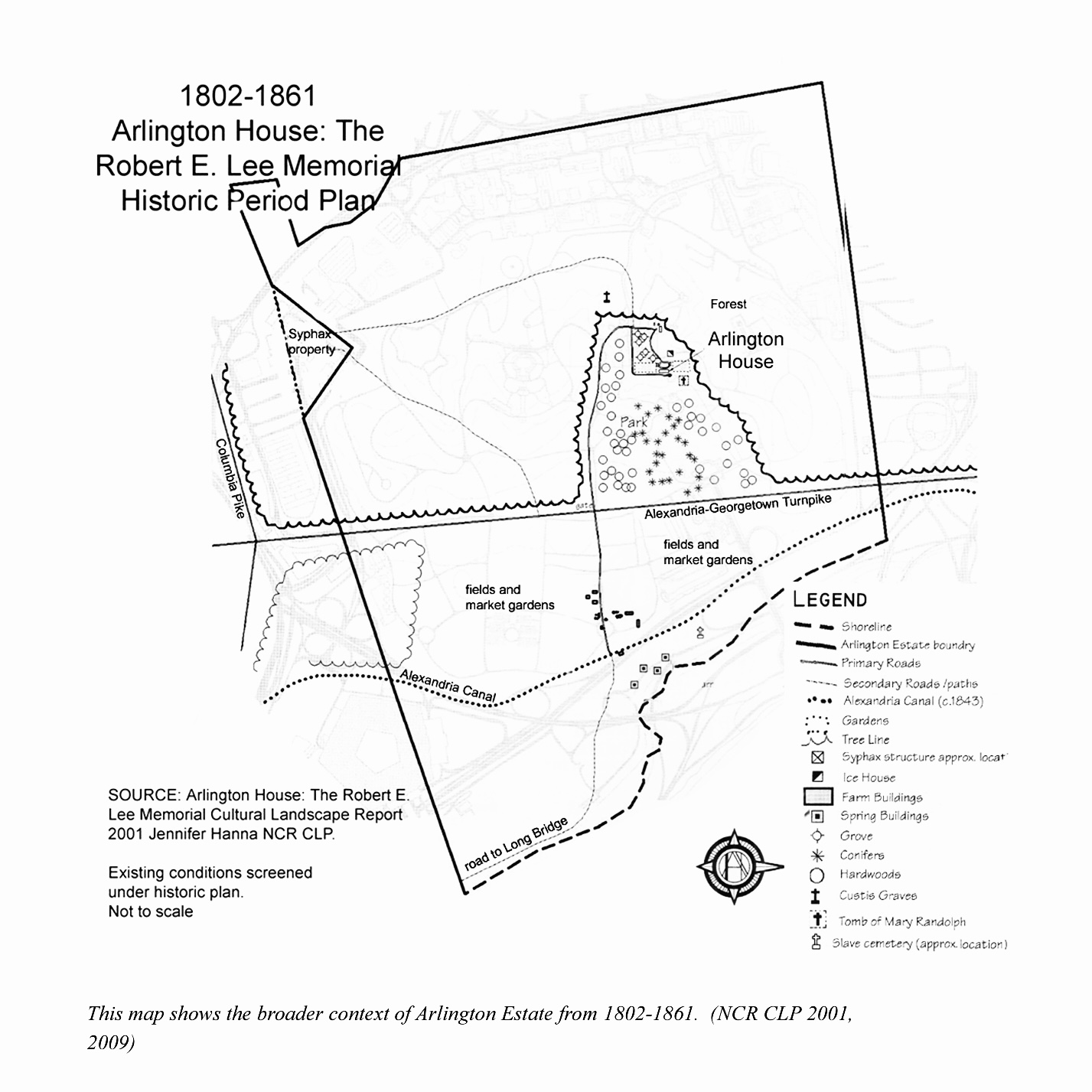
Historic map of Arlington Estate showing Syphax property (Map: Jennifer Hanna, U.S. National Park Service)

Maria Carter was born in 1803, the daughter of George Washington Parke Custis, grandson of Daniel Parke Custis, and a great-granddaughter of Martha Washington. Her mother was an enslaved maid at Mount Vernon named Airy or Arianna Carter. In an interview published decades later, Carter said that Custis had told her "face to face" that he was her father.

Until 1826 Carter worked in Arlington House, the mansion Custis built in Arlington, Virginia. There she met Charles Syphax, an enslaved man who oversaw Arlington House's dining room. Carter and Syphax were married in the parlor of Arlington House in 1826, a privilege not allowed to other slaves Custis owned. That same year Custis manumitted Maria Syphax and her two children and gave her 17 acres of the Arlington estate. Custis freed Charles Syphax by his will in 1857, after his death.

After Custis's death, his daughter Mary Anna Randolph Custis and son-in-law Robert E. Lee owned the Arlington plantation. During the American Civil War, the government seized Lee's property and the Syphax land along with it, as there was no written record of Custis's land transfer. The Freedman's Bureau created Freedman's Village on part of the Syphax property, where newly freed slaves took refuge.

Syphax's son William Syphax had become an employee of the US Department of the Interior and a significant part of Washington, D.C., civil life. He drew on his connections to assist his mother. In 1866, a "Bill for the Relief of Maria Syphax" was passed by the US Senate and signed into law restoring the Arlington land to the Syphax family.

== Family ==
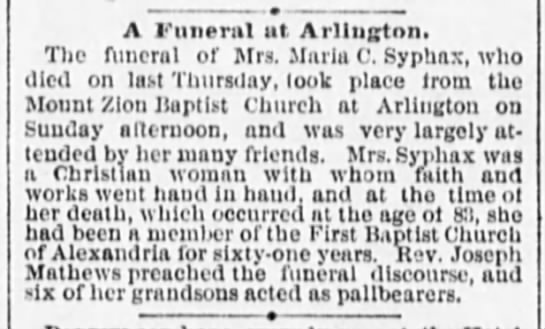
Syphax's funeral notice in the National Republican, February 2, 1886

Syphax had ten children:

- Elinor B. Syphax Reeves (1823-1910)
- William Syphax (1825-1891)
- Charles Syphax (1829-1885)
- Cornelius Syphax (1831-1885)
- Colbert Syphax (1834-1896)
- Austin Syphax (1836-1880)
- John B. Syphax (1838-1916)
- Shaulter Syphax (1840-1891)
- Ennis Syphax (1841-1880)
- Maria Syphax Frost (1844-1878)

== See also ==
- Philip Lee (valet) – Enslaved American (b. c. 1785)
