= William Syphax School =

- U.S. National Register of Historic Places
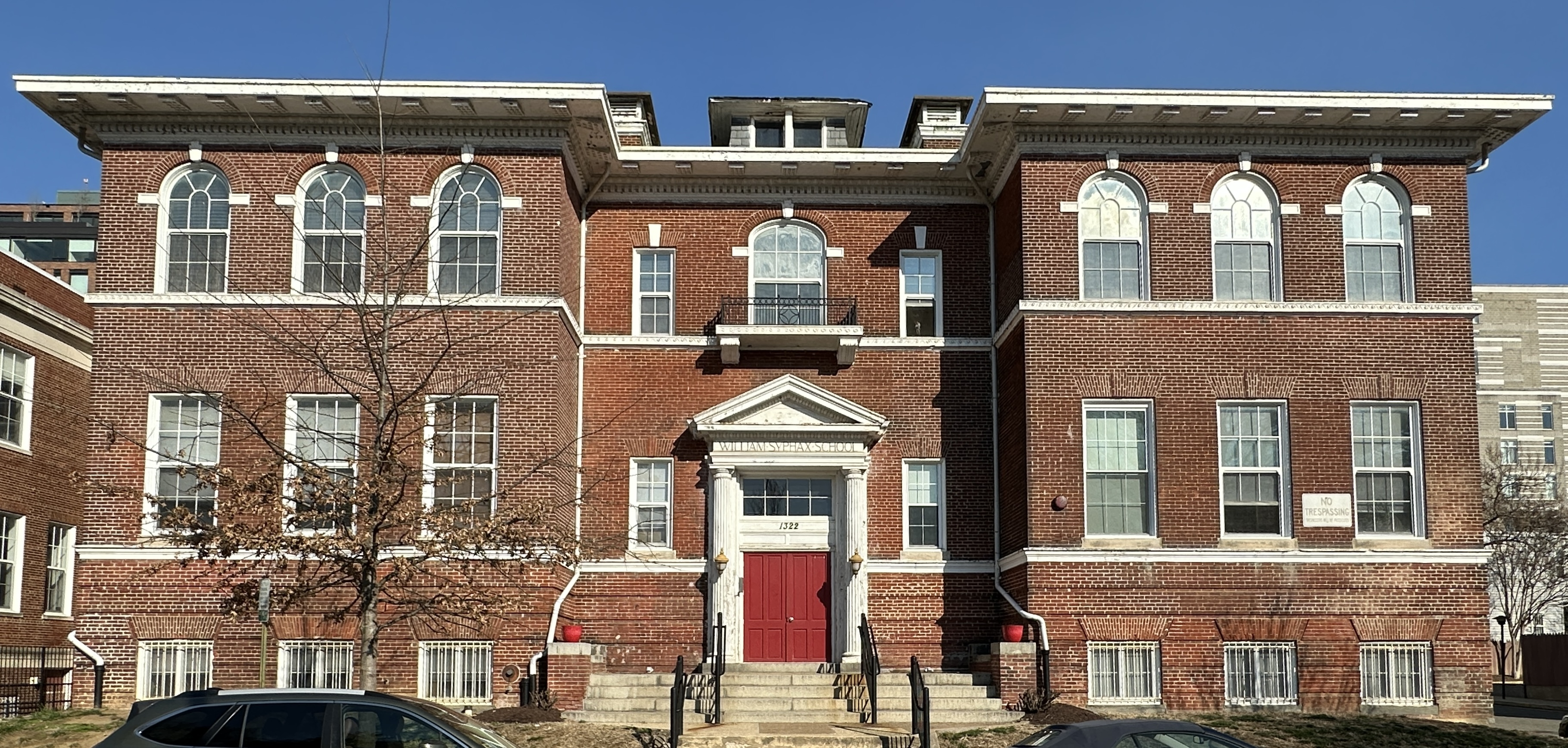
- William Syphax School in 2026

- Location within Washington, D.C. Location within the United States
- Location: 1322 Half St., SW; Washington, D.C.
- Coordinates: 38°52′33″N 77°0′31″W
- Built: 1901
- Architect: Marsh & Peter
- Architectural style: Colonial Revival
- MPS: Public School Buildings of Washington, DC MPS
- NRHP reference No.: 03000672
- Added to NRHP: July 25, 2003

William Syphax School, now known as Syphax Village, is a historic former school building in the Southwest Quadrant of Washington, D.C. that now houses condominiums. The building is listed on the National Register of Historic Places.

== History ==
The William Syphax School historically served African American students. It was named for William Syphax, the first president of the Board of Trustees of Colored Schools of Washington and Georgetown. He supported the notion of a unified public school system and supported equal educational standards. He was responsible for the construction of the Charles Sumner School and the Thaddeus Stevens School.

A building for the school was completed in 1901 and was expanded in 1941 and again in 1953. It ceased serving as a school in 1994. Three years later, residents complained that it had become a drug market and crack house. The Southwest Neighborhood Assembly began to aggressively seek out a developer and found one, which purchased the school in 1999. The old school building was officially declared a historic landmark in 2003, and the newer buildings were razed starting in 2001. Manna redeveloped the school building into a condominium development, which opened in 2005 as Syphax Village.

== Architecture ==
The building was designed in the Colonial Revival style. The D.C. Office of the Building Inspector commissioned its construction. It was designed by the architectural firm of Marsh & Peter. Municipal Architect Nathan C. Wyeth designed the 1941 addition. The original building is two and a half stories and is topped with a hipped roof. The exterior features a red brick façade arched windows and white terra cotta trim. The additions are also covered in red brick but have flat roofs, multi-paned windows, and limestone trim.
