= Leslie Mac =

American activist and community organizer

Leslie MacFadyen, known professionally as Leslie Mac, is an American activist and community organizer. She is a co-founder of the Ferguson Response Network, the co-creator of the Safety Pin Box monthly subscription service, and has created multiple digital campaigns such as #PayBlackWomen and #SlaveryWithASmile.

== Career ==
Mac attended Northwestern University's Medill School of Journalism before she dropped out. She also worked as a trainer helping open the international locations of corporate restaurants chains, and later became an event planner.

In 2014, she began grassroots organizing with the help of Feminista Jones, with whom she organized a National Moment of Silence (#NMOS14) vigil in the wake of Michael Brown's shooting death in Ferguson, MO. Mac then founded the Ferguson Response Network in 2014 to help train people in peaceful protest, and transitioned into full-time organizing. She has helped organized events such as the Reclaim MLK March in Philadelphia on January 20, 2015.

Mac was an activist in the Black Lives Matter of Unitarian Universalism.

She developed the Twitter hashtag #SlaveryWithASmile in January 2016 to protest the publication of a children's book, A Birthday Cake for George Washington, which depicted an enslaved chef baking a cake for George Washington. Authors such as Debbie Reese, Mikki Kendall, and Dr. Ebony Elizabeth Thomas joined the hashtag. The book was removed from circulation by Scholastic on January 17, 2016.

Together with fellow organizer Marissa Jenae Johnson, she developed Safety Pin Box in 2016, which is a monthly subscription box for "white people striving to be allies in the fight for Black Liberation." The idea was influenced by the popular safety pin concept developed by a woman in the UK who suggested wearing pins as a sign of solidarity to racial minorities after the Brexit vote. Each box offers specific steps white allies can take to engage in anti-racist allyship.

In December 2016 Mac posted on Facebook about racism, and shortly after actor Matt McGorry shared her post on his account in support, Mac's account was banned. After media coverage of the event, Facebook restored her account and stated that the banning had been an error.

Mac created the Twitter hashtag #PayBlackWomen in July 2018 to highlight the racial disparity in pay between Black women and white men. Politicians such as Rep. Barbara Lee and Rep. Yvette Clarke tweeted support of the hashtag.

== Personal life ==
Mac was born and raised in Flatbush, Brooklyn, New York to Jamaican immigrant parents. Mac is married and has been with her husband for 20 years.

== Awards ==
- Woke 100 Women, Honoree #33, Essence (2017)
- Voices of the Year, Impact Award, BlogHer (2017)
