= Ramin Ganeshram =

American food journalist and novelist (born 1968)

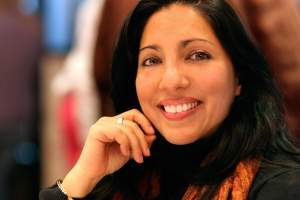
- Born: New York City, U.S.
- Education: Institute of Culinary Education; Columbia University Graduate School of Journalism
- Occupations: Food writer, novelist, nonprofit executive
- Spouse: Jean Paul Vellotti

Ramin Ganeshram (born June 21) is an American food journalist, novelist, and nonprofit executive. She is known for her work in polycultural American history and historic foodways.

== Early life and education ==
Ganeshram was born in New York City to a Trinidadian father and an Iranian mother. She attended Stuyvesant High School of Science and earned a master's degree in journalism from Columbia University, both in Manhattan. Later she trained at the Institute of Culinary Education, also in New York City. She later worked there as a chef instructor.

== Journalism career ==
In addition to contributing to a variety of major food publications, Ganeshram is the author of several cookbooks. She was a reporter and writer on Molly O'Neill's book One Big Table (Simon & Schuster 2010).

Ganeshram has received multiple awards for food writing, a nomination by the International Association of Culinary Professionals for a Bert Greene award in culinary journalism, and Cookbook of the Year Award.

In January 2010, she founded the charity Food 4 Haiti, to raise money for the UN World Food Programme's effort in the earthquake ravaged Haiti.

== Novelist ==
Ganeshram's first work of fiction, Stir It Up!, focuses on a teen chef who gets a shot at cooking competition show on Food Network. Ganeshram has appeared on Food Network on the show Throwdown! with Bobby Flay; she has also appeared on CNNfn, Good Day New York, and other news and lifestyle shows for both radio and television.

In 2018, Ganeshram published The General's Cook: A Novel (Skyhorse, NY), about Hercules Posey, the African-American chef enslaved by George Washington who self-emancipated in 1797. Ganeshram's children's book based on Hercules, A Birthday Cake for George Washington (Scholastic, 2016), drew criticism for what was deemed an overly positive portrayal of slavery and was recalled by the publisher shortly after publication. In early 2019, Craig LaBan of the Philadelphia Inquirer reported that Ganeshram and her Westport Historical Society colleague Sara Krasne uncovered compelling evidence that year suggesting Hercules, who had never been seen in public again after 1801, had lived for years in New York City. He was recorded to have died there on May 15, 1812. Their discovery offered scholarship on Hercules—including his surname—that earned Ganeshram and the Museum praise from historians at Mount Vernon and the writer/historian Professor Erica Armstrong Dunbar. Dunbar's work focused on Ona Judge, a woman enslaved by the Washington family, who left the household in Philadelphia and lived free in New Hampshire.

== Nonprofit director ==
Since 2018, Ganeshram has been the executive director of Westport Museum for History & Culture (formerly Westport Historical Society) in Westport, Connecticut. She has emphasized an inclusive history, representative of people of color, immigrants, women, and the LGBTQ community. In 2018-19 she curated the exhibit "Remembered: The History of African Americans in Westport", that focused on the history of enslavement and racial injustice toward African Americans in the Fairfield County, Connecticut town. Artifacts in the exhibit include "shackles and a reconstructed crawl space where two girls, household slaves, might have slept." The exhibit gained the museum awards from the Connecticut League of History Organizations, American Association for State & Local History, and the New England Museum Association. In October 2026, the museum announced that it needed to raise $750,000 by January 2027, or it might have to limit programs and sell its 230-year-old home..

== See also ==
- List of people from Westport, Connecticut
