= A Birthday Cake for George Washington =

Children's picture book

- Author: Ramin Ganeshram
- Illustrator: Vanessa Brantley-Newton
- Language: English
- Genre: Children's fiction
- Published: 2016 by Scholastic Press, an imprint of Scholastic, Inc.
- Publication place: United States
- Pages: 32
- ISBN: 978-0-545-53823-7

A Birthday Cake for George Washington is a children's picture book written by Ramin Ganeshram and illustrated by Vanessa Brantley-Newton, published by Scholastic and first released on January 5, 2016. It is narrated by Delia, the daughter of Hercules, one of George Washington's slaves who worked for him as a cook. The book tells the story of Hercules and Delia baking a birthday cake for Washington. Scholastic pulled the book on January 17, 2016 in response to criticism that the illustrations depicted an overly-positive portrayal of slavery.

== Criticism ==
While generally praised by traditional reviewers, Vicky Smith wrote about problems with the book in her article "Smiling Slaves in a Post-A Fine Dessert World" in Kirkus Reviews on January 4, 2016. Smith, Kirkus Reviews' children's and teen book editor, compared the book to A Fine Dessert by Emily Jenkins, another picture book which proved controversial because it depicted images of smiling slaves. She notes that Ganeshram did not mention in the narrative that when the real life Hercules escaped to freedom from Washington, he was forced to leave his daughter behind. Smith concluded that "It’s easy to understand why Ganeshram opted to leave those details out of her primary narrative: they’re a serious downer for readers, and they don’t have anything to do with the cake. But the story that remains nevertheless shares much of what ‘A Fine Dessert’’s critics found so objectionable: it’s an incomplete, even dishonest treatment of slavery.”

This was followed by more critiques, including of the illustrations of the characters as “smiling slaves” and thereby whitewashing the history of slavery and presenting an "offensively sanitized version" of slavery to children. Among the critics were Kiera Parrott, who wrote in School Library Journal that the book was "highly problematic" and that it "convey[s] a feeling of joyfulness that contrasts starkly with the reality of slave life". As of January 18, the book had received over 100 one-star ratings on Amazon.com.

On January 13, 2016, a critical review of the book by librarian Edith Campbell was posted on the Facebook page of the Washington, DC–based nonprofit Teaching for Change, alongside a photo of the book’s back cover. On this same day, Leslie MacFadyen of the National Ferguson Response Network entered the conversation and developed the hashtag #slaverywithasmile. This took the discussion beyond the children’s literature world to parents, educators, and activists. It also caught the attention of major media outlets, including the Atlanta Black Star, The Root, and Fusion. Thousands signed a protest petition at Change.org. Food historian Michael W. Twitty critiqued historical elements of the book in The Guardian while author Steve Sheinkin discussed the book in an Actually podcast. Debbie Reese of American Indians in Children’s Literature—who had played a major role drawing public attention to the Mexican American studies ban in Tucson—documented the evolution of events on her blog. Author Daniel José Older tweeted about the book. Older's tweets, the petition, and a summary of the campaign were published on Common Dreams.

The controversy evolved into discussions about how to present enslavement in children’s books.

== Withdrawal ==
Scholastic withdrew the book on January 17, 2016, following the criticism. In a statement, the publisher said:

Scholastic has a long history of explaining complex and controversial issues to children at all ages and grade levels. We do not believe this title meets the standards of appropriate presentation of information to younger children, despite the positive intentions and beliefs of the author, editor, and illustrator.

=== Reaction to withdrawal ===
The decision to withdraw the book was criticized by anti-censorship activists like the National Coalition Against Censorship (NCAC) and the PEN American Center, which released a statement saying that "Those who value free speech as an essential human right and a necessary precondition for social change should be alarmed whenever books are removed from circulation because they are controversial". The NCAC's statement also defended the book by saying that it had helped promote discussion about how Americans remember slavery. Scholastic responded to this statement by accusing both the NCAC and PEN of not correctly reading Scholastic's initial statement, and asserting that the book was withdrawn "not in response to criticism, but entirely and purposefully because this title did not meet our publishing standards" although Scholastic, not the author, or illustrator, was solely in charge of the publishing process.

In an interview with the Associated Press, the author responded to the public outcry and withdrawal of the book, stating that she had continually voiced concerns about the “over jovial” depiction of the enslaved characters but that she had been repeatedly ignored by the publisher. The book’s editor Andrea Davis Pinkney and illustrator Vanessa Brantley-Newton did not respond for requests for comment from the Associated Press.

Farah Mendlesohn wrote that the decision by Scholastic to withdraw the book was product recall, not censorship, and argued that if "it is acceptable and “free speech” to turn [the story of Hercules] into a happy little story about a slave serving his master joyfully, then I look forward to Scholastic producing a bright little picture book called The Children’s Choir of Terezin."

== See also ==
- Washington's Birthday
