= Hercules Posey =

Enslaved cook held at Mount Vernon (c. 1748–1812)

- Born: c. 1748; Virginia, Thirteen Colonies
- Died: May 15, 1812 (age 63-64); New York, United States
- Other name: Uncle Harkless
- Occupation: Cook to George Washington
- Known for: Cook; Fugitive slave
- Children: 3 (maybe 4)

Hercules Posey (c. 1748 – May 15, 1812) was an enslaved African American held at George Washington's plantation Mount Vernon in Virginia. "Uncle Harkless," as he was called by a grandson of Martha Washington, served as chief cook at the Mansion House for many years. In November 1790, Hercules was one of eight enslaved Africans brought by President Washington to Philadelphia, Pennsylvania, then the temporary national capital, to serve in the household of the President's House, as the third presidential mansion was known.

On February 22, 1797, Washington's 65th birthday, Hercules escaped from Mount Vernon and reached New York City, where he lived free under the name "Hercules Posey." Posey remained legally a fugitive slave until January 1, 1801, when he was manumitted under the terms of Washington's will. Because Posey's late wife Alice had been a "Dower" slave, owned by the estate of Martha Washington's first husband, their three children also had "dower" status and were not freed. Posey died in New York City in 1812 and was buried in the Shockoe Hill African Burying Ground (sometimes referred to as the "Second African Burying Ground").

== Life at Mount Vernon ==
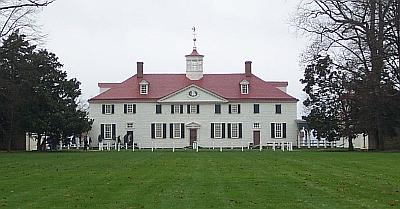
Mount Vernon from the north. Hercules was one of two cooks listed in the 1786 Mount Vernon Slave Census.

Hercules was probably born around 1748, and was acquired by Washington as collateral for an unpaid loan made to Hercules's original owner, Washington's neighbor John Posey. Hercules first appears on tax records for Mount Vernon in 1771.

Hercules chose Alice, one of Martha Washington's "dower" slaves, as his wife, and they had three children: Richmond (born 1777), Eve (born 1782), and Delia (born 1785). He, Alice, and the three children were listed in the February 1786 Mount Vernon Slave Census, which records him as one of two cooks in the Mansion House. Alice died in 1787.

Following Alice's death, he may have had another daughter. The sole source for this daughter is Louis Philippe's diary (see below). Louis Philippe's secretary estimated the girl's age as six, but she may have been Hercules's daughter Eve, who was listed in the June 1799 Mount Vernon Slave Census as "a dwarf."

== Presidential household ==
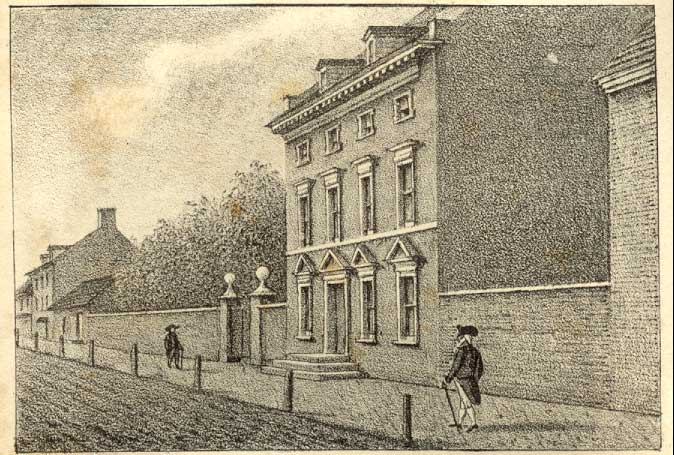
"Washington's Residence, High Street". Lithograph by William L. Breton, from John Fanning Watson's Annals of Philadelphia (1830).

Hercules was one of eight enslaved Africans brought to Philadelphia in 1790 by Washington to work in the presidential household. The others were Hercules's son Richmond (then 13 years old), Oney Judge, Moll, Austin, Christopher Sheels, Giles, and Paris. Following the December 20, 1794 death of Austin in Maryland while on a solo trip back to Mount Vernon, Washington brought "Postillion" Joe (Richardson) to Philadelphia.

In the memoirs of Martha Washington's grandson, G.W.P. Custis, Hercules was recalled as "a celebrated artiste ... as highly accomplished a proficient in the culinary art as could be found in the United States." The cook was given the privilege of selling the extra food from the Philadelphia kitchen which, by Custis's estimate, earned him nearly $200 a year, the annual salary of a hired cook. According to Custis, Hercules was a dapper dresser and was given freedom to walk about in the city.

Washington allowed Hercules's son Richmond to work alongside his father in the Philadelphia kitchen for about a year, before returning him to Virginia. In November 1796, Richmond was implicated in a theft of money at Mount Vernon. Washington had suspicions that the father and son were planning a joint escape.

=== Gradual Abolition Act ===
In 1780, Pennsylvania passed the Gradual Abolition Act, which freed all future children of the state's enslaved. (Note: Any future child of an enslaved Pennsylvania mother was born free, but also was required to work as an indentured servant for the mother's master until age 28.) The act also prohibited non-resident slaveholders living in Pennsylvania from holding slaves in the state longer than six months. (Note: By strict legal interpretation, a slave's residency could be terminated by spending one day outside the state. Non-resident slaveholders exploited this loophole until Pennsylvania eliminated it with a 1788 amendment to the Gradual Abolition Act. It was this amendment that Washington repeatedly violated. He was also careful never to spend six continuous months in Pennsylvania himself (which could be interpreted as his establishing legal residency), arguing that he remained a citizen of Virginia, and subject to its laws regarding slavery.) If held beyond that period, the act empowered those slaves to register as Pennsylvania residents, and petition for their freedom. Members of Congress and their slaves were specifically exempted from the act. Officers of the executive and judicial branches of the federal government were not mentioned, since those branches did not exist until the U.S. Constitution was ratified, in 1789.

When the national capital moved to Philadelphia in 1790, there was uncertainty about whether Pennsylvania law would apply to federal officials. Washington argued (privately) that he was a citizen of Virginia, that his presence in Pennsylvania was solely a consequence of Philadelphia's being the temporary national capital, and that the state law should not apply to him. Rather than challenging the state law in court, Washington took the advice of his attorney general, Edmund Randolph, and systematically rotated the President's House slaves in and out of the state to prevent them from establishing a continuous six-month residency. In Prigg v. Pennsylvania (1842), the U.S. Supreme Court found that federal law trumped state law, and Pennsylvania's 1788 amendment to the Gradual Abolition Act was an unconstitutional challenge to the property rights of slaveholders, both inside and outside the state.

== New research ==
=== 2010 ===
Stephen Decatur Jr.'s book The Private Affairs of George Washington (1933) stated that Hercules escaped to freedom from Philadelphia in March 1797, at the end of Washington's presidency. Decatur, a descendant of Washington's secretary, Tobias Lear, discovered a cache of family papers unavailable to scholars, and presented Hercules's escape from Philadelphia as fact.

New research documents that Hercules was left behind at Mount Vernon following Christmas 1796, when the Washingtons returned to Philadelphia. Historian Anna Coxe Toogood found Hercules and Richmond listed in the Mount Vernon farm records during the winter of 1796–97. With the Washingtons away, they and other domestic servants were assigned as laborers, to pulverize stone, dig brick clay, and grub out honeysuckle.

In November 2009, Mary V. Thompson, research specialist at Mount Vernon, discovered that Hercules's escape to freedom was from Mount Vernon, and that it occurred on February 22, 1797 – Washington's 65th birthday. The president celebrated the day in Philadelphia, but it was also a holiday on the Virginia plantation. An entry in that week's Mount Vernon farm report noted that Hercules "absconded 4 [days ago]".

=== 2019 ===
As reported by Craig LaBan in The Philadelphia Inquirer in March 2019, Ramin Ganeshram uncovered new research about Hercules's likely whereabouts following his escape. Ganeshram, and her colleague Sara Krasne at the Westport Historical Society, found compelling evidence suggesting that Hercules, of whom there was no record after 1801, lived and died in New York City. Krasne found an index entry that listed a Hercules Posey of Virginia, aged 64, as having died of consumption on May 15, 1812, and having been buried in the Second African Burying Ground in New York City. Their new research was published by the Westport Historical Society in 2019.

== Freedom for some ==
Louis-Philippe, later king of France, visited Mount Vernon in the spring of 1797. According to his April 5 diary entry:

The general's cook ran away, being now in Philadelphia, and left a little daughter of six at Mount Vernon. Beaudoin ventured that the little girl must be deeply upset that she would never see her father again; she answered, "Oh! Sir, I am very glad, because he is free now."

Hercules remained in hiding. In January 1798, the former President's house steward, Frederick Kitt, informed Washington that the fugitive was living in Philadelphia:

Since your departure I have been making distant enquiries about Herculas but did not till about four weeks ago hear anything of him and that was only that [he] was in town neither do I yet know where he is, and that it will be very difficult to find out in the secret manner necessary to be observed on the occasion.

The 1799 Mount Vernon Slave Census listed 124 enslaved Africans owned by Washington and 153 "dower" slaves owned by Martha Washington's family. Washington's 1799 Will instructed that his slaves be freed upon Martha's death. Washington died on December 14, 1799. At Martha Washington's request, the three executors of Washington's Estate freed her late husband's slaves on January 1, 1801. It is possible that Hercules did not know he had been manumitted, and legally was no longer a fugitive. In a December 15, 1801, letter, Martha Washington indicated that she had learned that Hercules, by then legally free, was living in New York City. Nothing more is known of his whereabouts or life in freedom.

=== Descendants ===
Hercules and his wife Alice had three children: son Richmond (born 1777) and daughters Eve (also Evey; born 1782) and Delia (born 1785). Alice was a "dower" slave, and belonged to the Estate of Daniel Parke Custis, Martha Washington's first husband. Louis Philippe I, later the last King of France, visited Mount Vernon in 1797, and wrote in his diary of Hercules's escape to freedom and how he had left behind his six-year-old daughter. This may have been Eve, or it may have been an unidentified fourth child fathered by Hercules after his wife's death.

A slave census taken in June 1799, only a few months before George Washington's death, shows that Richmond, in his early twenties, was working at the River Farm, on the outlying part of Mount Vernon, while Eve and Delia, in their teens, were working at the Mansion House.

Hercules and the other African Americans enslaved by George Washington were ultimately freed in 1801, but Hercules's children were not freed. Neither Martha Washington nor George Washington owned the "dower" slaves, and because Alice had been a "dower," her children had the same legal status. Following Martha Washington’s death, the Daniel Parke Custis Estate was dissolved and its assets distributed. Richmond, Eve and Delia would have been divided among Martha Washington's four grandchildren, but it is not known who was sent where.

== Legacy ==
c. 1780 portrait of a man often identified as Posey. Recent research reveals he was most likely a Dominican in England.

A new building for the Liberty Bell opened in Philadelphia in 2003. During excavation in 2000, remnants of the icehouse of the long-demolished President's House were uncovered. A more extensive archeological excavation was undertaken in 2007, which revealed foundations of the kitchen, an underground passage that connected the kitchen to the main house, and foundations of the Bow Window (a precursor to the Oval Office). A memorial has been created on the site of the President's House to commemorate the house and all its residents, and honor the contributions of the slaves there and in Philadelphia's history and American history.

A portrait long attributed to Gilbert Stuart, now at the Thyssen-Bornemisza Museum in Madrid, Spain, and thought to portray Hercules was examined by experts in 2017. They determined that it was not a portrait of Hercules. In addition, it was not painted by Stuart. Dorinda Evans concluded it was most likely from the circle of Sir Joshua Reynolds.

A picture book for young children about Hercules, A Birthday Cake for George Washington, illustrated by Vanessa Brantley-Newton and authored by Ramin Ganeshram, was published by Scholastic Trade Publishing in January 2016. After receiving severe and widespread criticism for illustrations "depicting happy slaves", it was pulled by its publisher. In 2018, Ganeshram published The General's Cook, the novel she had been working on prior to the publication of Birthday Cake. In the novel's acknowledgements, the author reprised public statements regarding her objections to and attempts to persuade the publisher to alter what she called the "offensive nature" of the picture book's illustrations.

== See also ==
- George Washington and slavery
- List of enslaved people of Mount Vernon
- List of enslaved people
