= George Washington and slavery =

George Washington's relationship with slavery

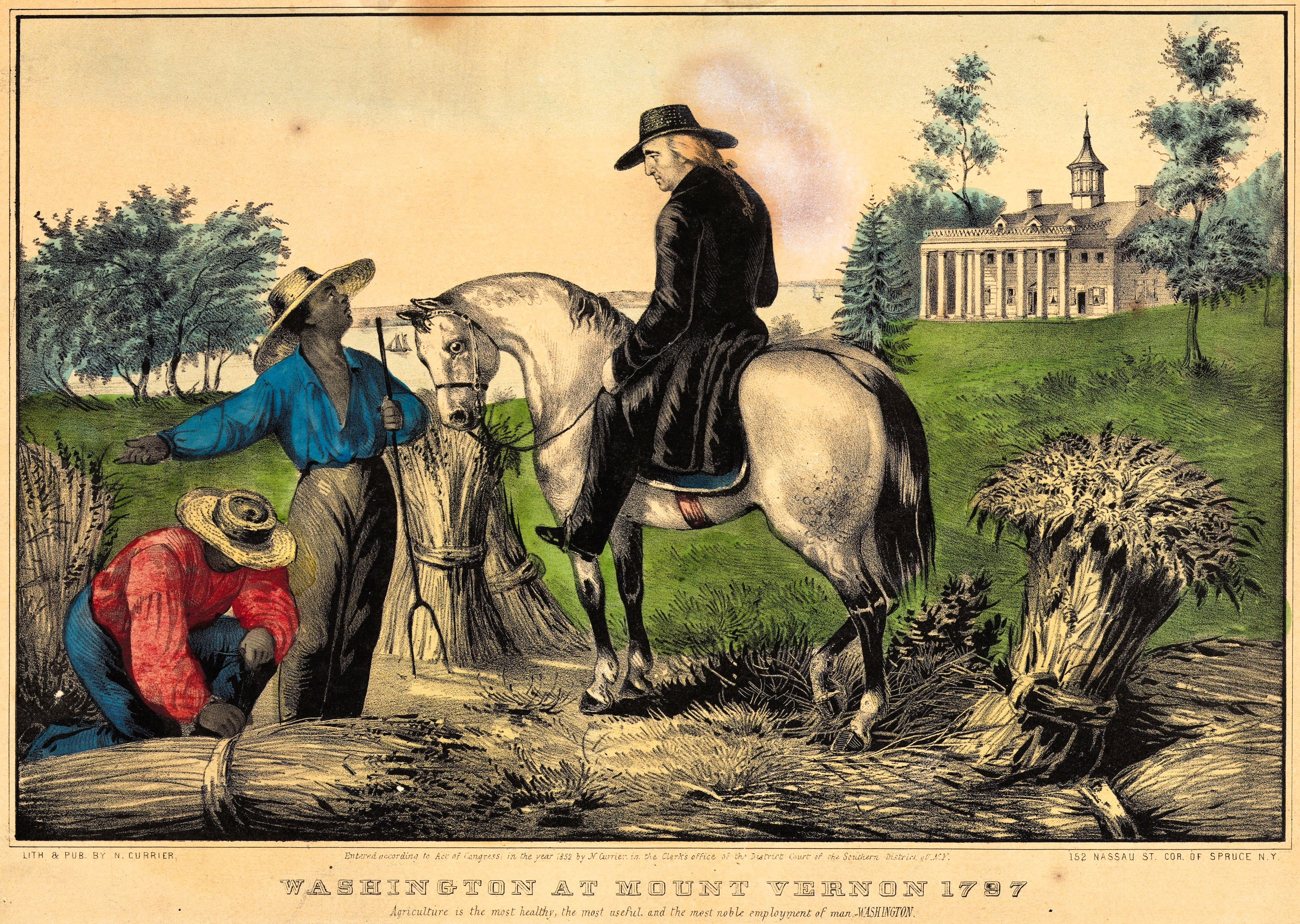
George Washington and enslaved workers on his Mount Vernon plantation

The history of George Washington and slavery reflects Washington's changing attitude toward the ownership of human beings. The preeminent Founding Father of the United States and a hereditary slaveowner, Washington became privately regretful about it, but continued the practice until his death. Slavery was then a longstanding institution dating back over a century in Virginia where he lived; it was also longstanding in other American colonies and in world history. Washington's will immediately freed one of his slaves, and required his remaining 123 slaves to serve his wife and be freed no later than her death; they ultimately became free one year after his own death.

In the Colony of Virginia where Washington grew up, he became a third generation slave-owner at 11 years of age upon the death of his father in 1743, when he inherited his first ten slaves. In adulthood his personal slaveholding grew through inheritance, purchase, and the natural increase of children born into slavery. In 1759, he also gained substantial control of dower slaves belonging to the Custis estate on his marriage to Martha Dandridge Custis. Washington's early attitudes about slavery reflected the prevailing Virginia planter views of the day, which included few moral qualms, if any. Later, in 1774, Washington publicly denounced the slave trade on moral grounds in the Fairfax Resolves. After the Revolutionary War, he continued to own enslaved human beings, but supported the abolition of slavery by a gradual legislative process.

Washington was a workaholic and required the same from both hired workers and enslaved people. He provided his enslaved population with basic food, clothing and accommodation comparable to general practice at the time, which was not always adequate, and with medical care. In return, he forced them to work from sunrise to sunset over the six-day working week that was standard at the time, excepting children, the infirm, and the elderly. Some three-quarters of his enslaved workers labored in the fields, and the rest were domestic servants and artisans. They supplemented their diet by hunting, trapping, and growing vegetables in their free time, and bought extra rations, clothing and housewares with income from selling game and produce. They built their own community around marriage and family, though Washington allocated the enslaved to his farms according to business needs, which separated many families during the work week. Washington used both reward and punishment to manage his enslaved population, but was constantly disappointed when they failed to meet his exacting standards. A significant proportion of the enslaved people at the Mount Vernon estate resisted their enslavement by various means, such as theft to supplement food and clothing or to provide income, feigning illness, and escaping to freedom.

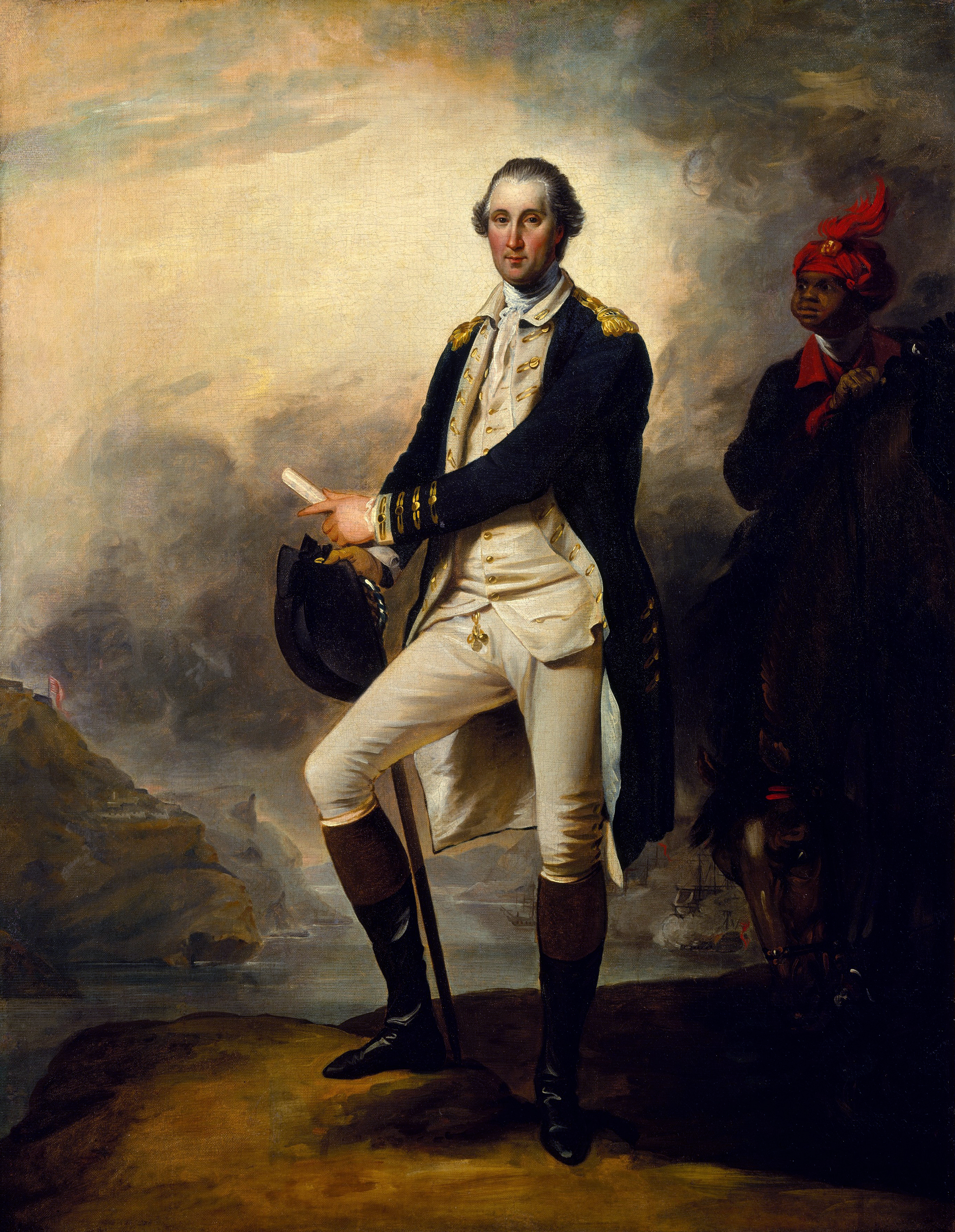
George Washington (John Trumbull, 1780), with William Lee, Washington's enslaved personal servant

As commander-in-chief of the Continental Army in 1775, he initially refused to accept African-Americans, free or enslaved, into the ranks, but bowed to the demands of war, and thereafter led a racially integrated army. In 1778, Washington expressed moral aversion to selling some of his enslaved workers at a public venue or splitting their families. At war's end, Washington demanded without success that the British respect the preliminary peace treaty which he said required return of all escaped slaves. Politically, Washington felt that the divisive issue of American slavery threatened national cohesion; he never spoke publicly about it even in his speeches addressing the new nation’s challenges, and he signed laws that protected slavery as well as laws that curtailed slavery. At his residence in Pennsylvania, he used technicalities of state laws to avoid losing his personal enslaved population.

Privately, Washington considered freeing his enslaved population in the mid 1790s. Those plans failed because of his inability to raise the finances he said were necessary, the refusal of his family to approve emancipation of the dower slaves, and his aversion to splitting the many families that included both dower slaves and his own slaves. By the time of Washington's death in 1799 there were 317 enslaved people at Mount Vernon. 124 were owned outright by Washington, 40 were rented, and the remainder were dower slaves owned by the estate of Martha Washington's first husband, Daniel Parke Custis, on behalf of their grandchildren. Washington's will was widely published upon his death, and provided for the eventual emancipation of the enslaved population owned by him, one of the few slave-owning founders to do so. He could not legally free the dower slaves, and so the will said that, except for his valet William Lee who was freed immediately, his enslaved workers were bequeathed to his widow Martha until her death. She felt unsafe amidst slaves whose freedom depended on her demise, and freed them in 1801.

== Background ==
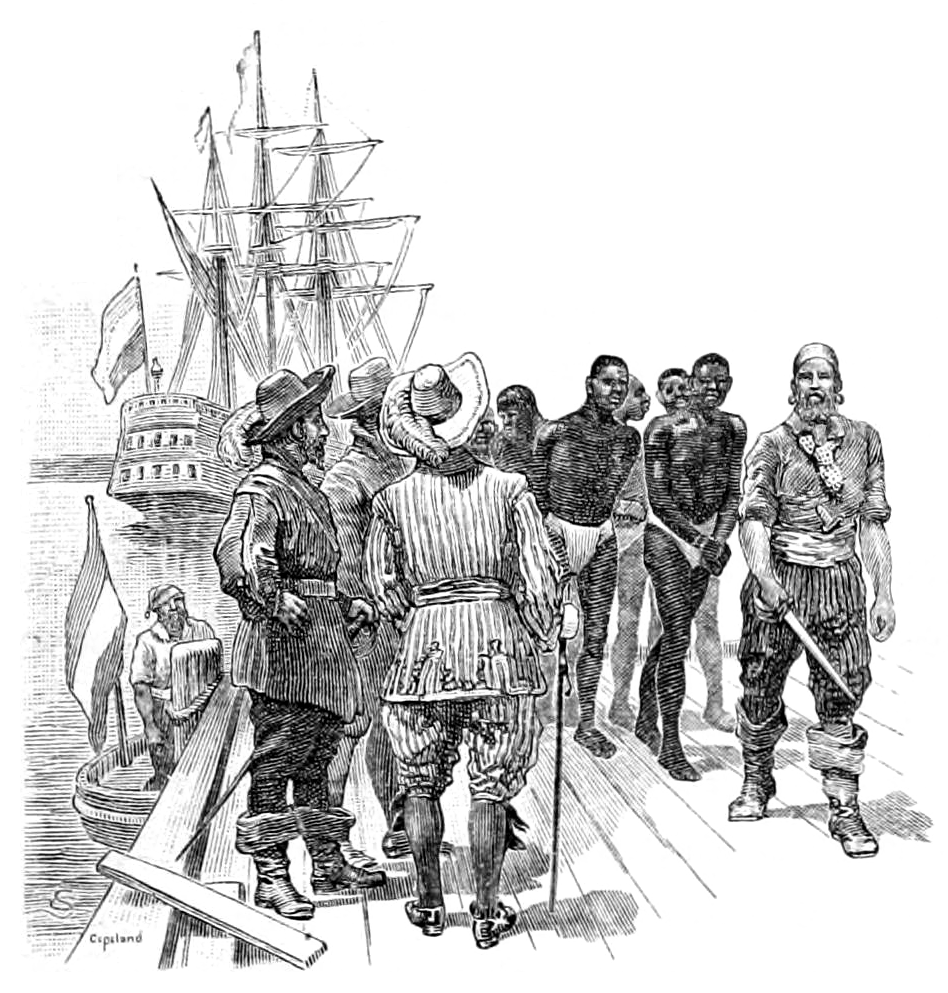
First enslaved Africans arriving in Virginia

Slavery was introduced into the English colony of Virginia when Africans were first transported to Point Comfort in 1619. Those who accepted Christianity became "Christian servants" with time-limited servitude, or even freed, but this mechanism for ending bondage was gradually shut down. In 1667, the Virginia Assembly passed a law that barred baptism as a means of conferring freedom. Africans who had been baptised before arriving in Virginia could be granted the status of indentured servant until 1682, when another law declared them to be slaves. In the lowest stratum of Virginian society, white people and people of African descent shared common disadvantages and a common lifestyle, which included intermarriage until the Assembly made such unions punishable by banishment in 1691.

In 1671, Virginia counted 6,000 white indentured servants among its 40,000 population but only 2,000 people of African descent, up to a third of whom in some counties were free. Towards the end of the 17th century, English policy shifted in favor of retaining cheap labor rather than shipping it to the colonies, and the supply of indentured servants in Virginia began to dry up; by 1715, annual immigration was in the hundreds, compared with 1,500–2,000 in the 1680s. As tobacco planters put more land under cultivation, they made up the shortfall in labor with increasing numbers of enslaved workers. The institution was rooted in race with the Virginia Slave Codes of 1705, and from around 1710 the growth in the enslaved population was fueled by natural increase. Between 1700 and 1750 the number of enslaved people in the colony increased from 13,000 to 105,000, nearly eighty percent of them born in Virginia. In Washington's lifetime, slavery was deeply ingrained in the economic and social fabric of Virginia, where some forty percent of the population and virtually all African Americans were enslaved.

George Washington was born in 1732, the first child of his father Augustine's second marriage. Augustine was a tobacco planter with some 10,000 acres (4,000 ha) of land and 50 enslaved humans. On his death in 1743, he left his 2,500-acre (1,000 ha) Little Hunting Creek to George's older half-brother Lawrence, who renamed it Mount Vernon. Washington inherited the 260-acre (110 ha) Ferry Farm and ten enslaved people. He leased Mount Vernon from Lawrence's widow two years after his brother's death in 1752 and inherited it in 1761. He was an aggressive land speculator, and by 1774 he had amassed some 32,000 acres (13,000 ha) of land in the Ohio Country on Virginia's western frontier. At his death he possessed over 80,000 acres (32,000 ha). In 1757, he began a program of expansion at Mount Vernon that would ultimately result in an 8,000-acre (3,200 ha) estate with five separate farms, on which he initially grew tobacco. (Note: Washington's residence was at Mansion House Farm, where fruit, vegetables and herbs were grown for his table, plus flowers and exotic plants. Horses and mules were bred in stables there, and tropical plants were grown in a greenhouse. Trades such as blacksmithing, carpentry, barrel making (coopering), food production and preservation, spinning, weaving and shoe making were carried out in other buildings at Mansion House Farm. Some crops were grown at this farm, but the main agricultural business was conducted at the four outlying farms located in a radius of between one and a half miles (2.4 km) and three miles (4.8 km) from the mansion: Dogue Run Farm, Muddy Hole Farm, Union Farm (formed from the earlier Ferry Farm and French's Farm) and River Farm. A farm manager responsible for the running of the estate reported directly to Washington, while an overseer was employed at each of the farms.)

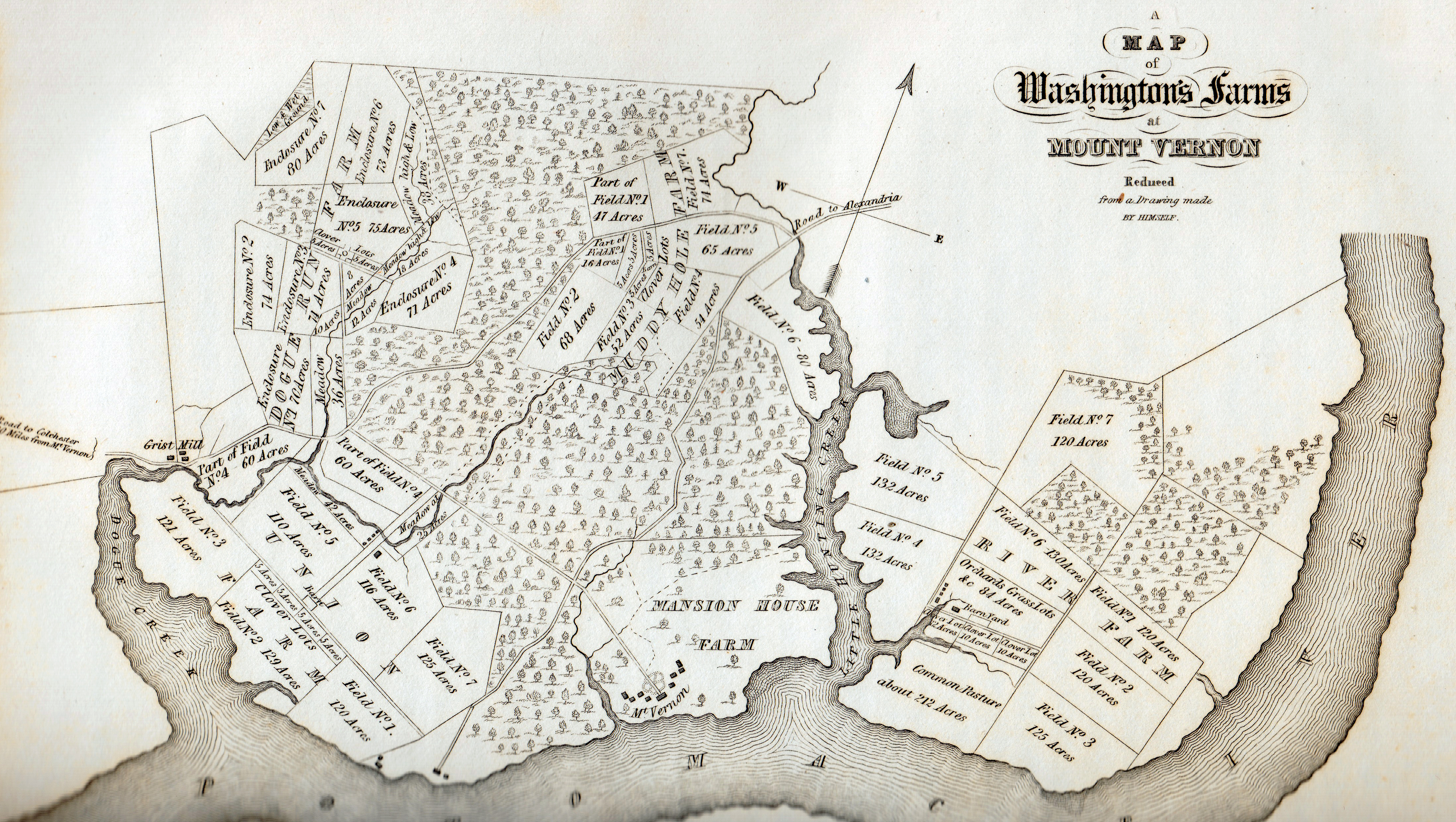
Mount Vernon estate

Agricultural land required labor to be productive, and in the 18th-century American south institutional slave labor produced the greatest profits. Washington inherited slaves from Lawrence, acquired more as part of the terms of leasing Mount Vernon, and inherited slaves again on the death of Lawrence's widow in 1761. On his marriage in 1759 to Martha Dandridge Custis, Washington gained control of eighty-four dower slaves. Martha had a life interest in those dower slaves, whom she held in trust for the heirs of the Custis estate, and although Washington had no legal title to them, he managed them as his own property. Between 1752 and 1773, he purchased at least seventy-one slaves – men, women and children. He scaled back significantly his purchasing of enslaved workers after the American Revolution but continued to acquire them, mostly through natural increase and occasionally in settlement of debts. In 1786, he listed 216 enslaved people – 122 men and women and 88 children (Note: Six of the enslaved in the 1786 census were listed as dead or incapacitated.) – making him one of the largest slaveholders in Fairfax County. Of that total, 103 belonged to Washington, the remainder being dower slaves. By the time of Washington's death in 1799, the population enslaved at Mount Vernon had increased to 317 people, including 143 children. Of that total, he owned 124, leased 40 and controlled 153 dower slaves.

== Slavery at Mount Vernon ==
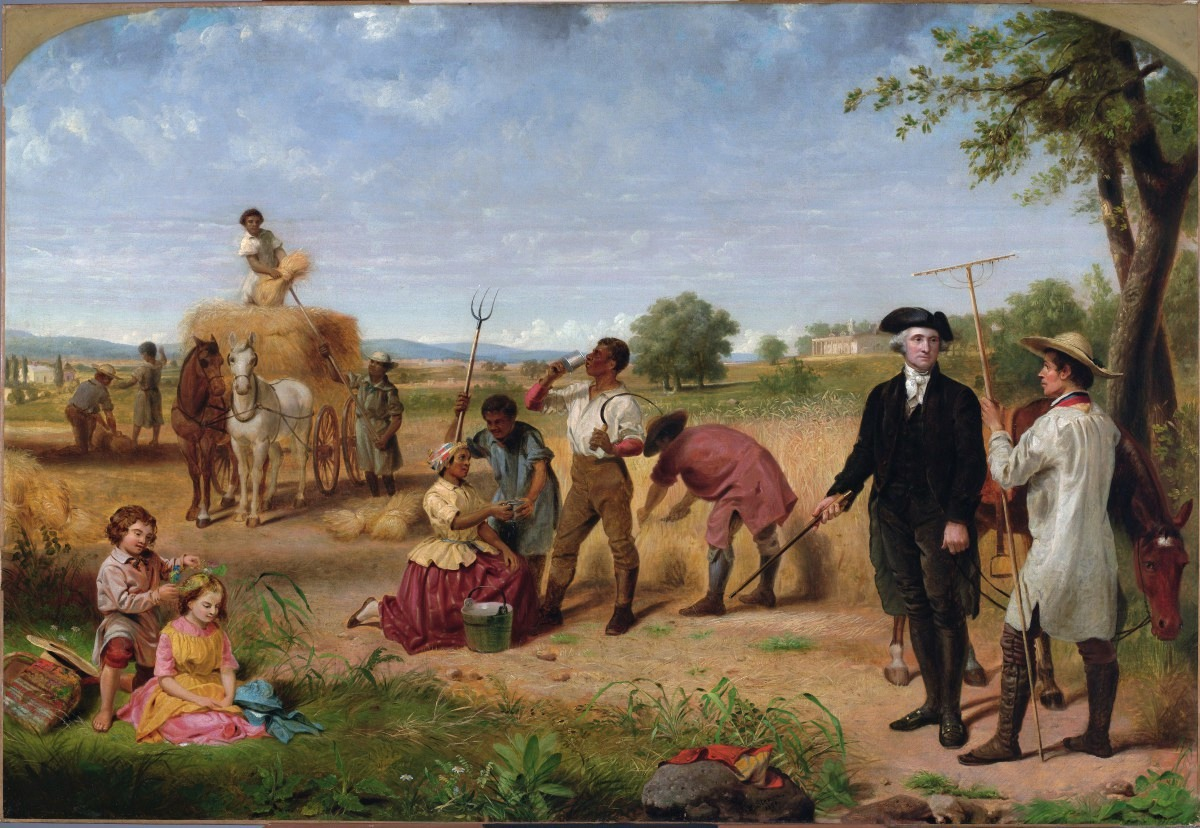
Washington the Farmer at Mount Vernon, an 1851 portrait by Junius Brutus Stearns. This painting shows an idealized version of plantation work, far removed from the reality of the harsh conditions endured by the slaves.

Washington thought of his workers as part of an extended family with him the father figure at its head. He displayed elements of both patriarchy and paternalism in his attitudes to the slaves he controlled. The patriarch in him expected absolute obedience and manifested itself in a strict, rigorous control of the enslaved workers and the emotional distance he maintained from them. There are examples of genuine affection between master and enslaved, such as was the case with his valet William Lee, but such cases were the exception. The paternalist in him saw his relationship with his enslaved people as one of mutual obligations; he provided for them and they in return served him, a relationship in which the enslaved were able to approach Washington with their concerns and grievances. Paternal masters regarded themselves as generous and deserving of gratitude. When Martha’s maid Oney Judge escaped in 1796, Washington complained about "the ingratitude of the girl, who was brought up and treated more like a child than a Servant".

George Washington is a hard master, very severe, a hard husband, a hard father, a hard governor. From his childhood he always ruled and ruled severely. He was first brought up to govern slaves, he then governed an army, then a nation. He thinks hard of all, is despotic in every respect, he mistrusts every man, thinks every man a rogue and nothing but severity will do.

— Thomas Jefferson, 1799

I think I knew General Washington intimately and thoroughly; and were I called on to delineate his character it should be in terms like these....He was, indeed, in every sense of the words, a wise, a good, and a great man....in nothing bad, in few points indifferent; and it may truly be said that never did nature and fortune combine more perfectly to make a man great and to place him in the same constellation with whatever worthies have merited from man an everlasting remembrance.

— Thomas Jefferson, 1814

Although Washington employed a farm manager to run the estate and an overseer at each of the farms, he was a hands-on manager who ran his business with a military discipline and involved himself in the minutiae of everyday work. During extended absences while on official business, he maintained close control through weekly reports from the farm manager and overseers. He demanded from all of his workers the same meticulous eye for detail that he exercised himself; a former enslaved worker would later recall that the "slaves...did not quite like" Washington, primarily because "he was so exact and so strict...if a rail, a clapboard, or a stone was permitted to remain out of its place, he complained; sometimes in language of severity." In Washington's view, "lost labour is never to be regained", and he required "every labourer (male or female) [do] as much in the 24 hours as their strength without endangering the health, or constitution will allow of". He was a workaholic, and expected the same strong work ethic from his workers, both enslaved and hired. He was constantly disappointed with enslaved workers who did not share his motivation and resisted his demands, leading him to regard them as indolent and insist that his overseers supervise them closely at all times.

In 1799, nearly three-quarters of the enslaved population, over half of them female, worked in the fields. They were kept busy year round, their tasks varying with the season. The remainder worked as domestic servants in the main residence or as artisans, such as carpenters, joiners, coopers, spinners and seamstresses. Between 1766 and 1799, seven dower slaves worked at one time or another as overseers. Slaves were expected to work from sunrise to sunset over a six-day work week that was standard on Virginia plantations. With two hours off for meals, their workdays would range between seven and a half hours to thirteen hours, depending on season. They were given three or four days off at Christmas and a day each at Easter and Whitsunday. Domestic slaves started early, worked into the evenings and did not necessarily have Sundays and holidays free. On special occasions when enslaved workers were required to put in extra effort, such as working through a holiday or bringing in the harvest, they were paid or compensated with extra time off.

Washington instructed his overseers to treat enslaved people "with humanity and tenderness" when sick. Enslaved people who were less able, through injury, disability or age, were given light duties, while those too sick to work were generally, though not always, excused work while they recovered. Washington provided them with good, sometimes costly medical care – when an enslaved person named Cupid fell ill with pleurisy, Washington had him taken to the main house where he could be better cared for and personally checked on him throughout the day. The paternal concern for the welfare of his enslaved workers was mixed with an economic consideration for the lost productivity arising from sickness and death among the labor force.

=== Living conditions ===
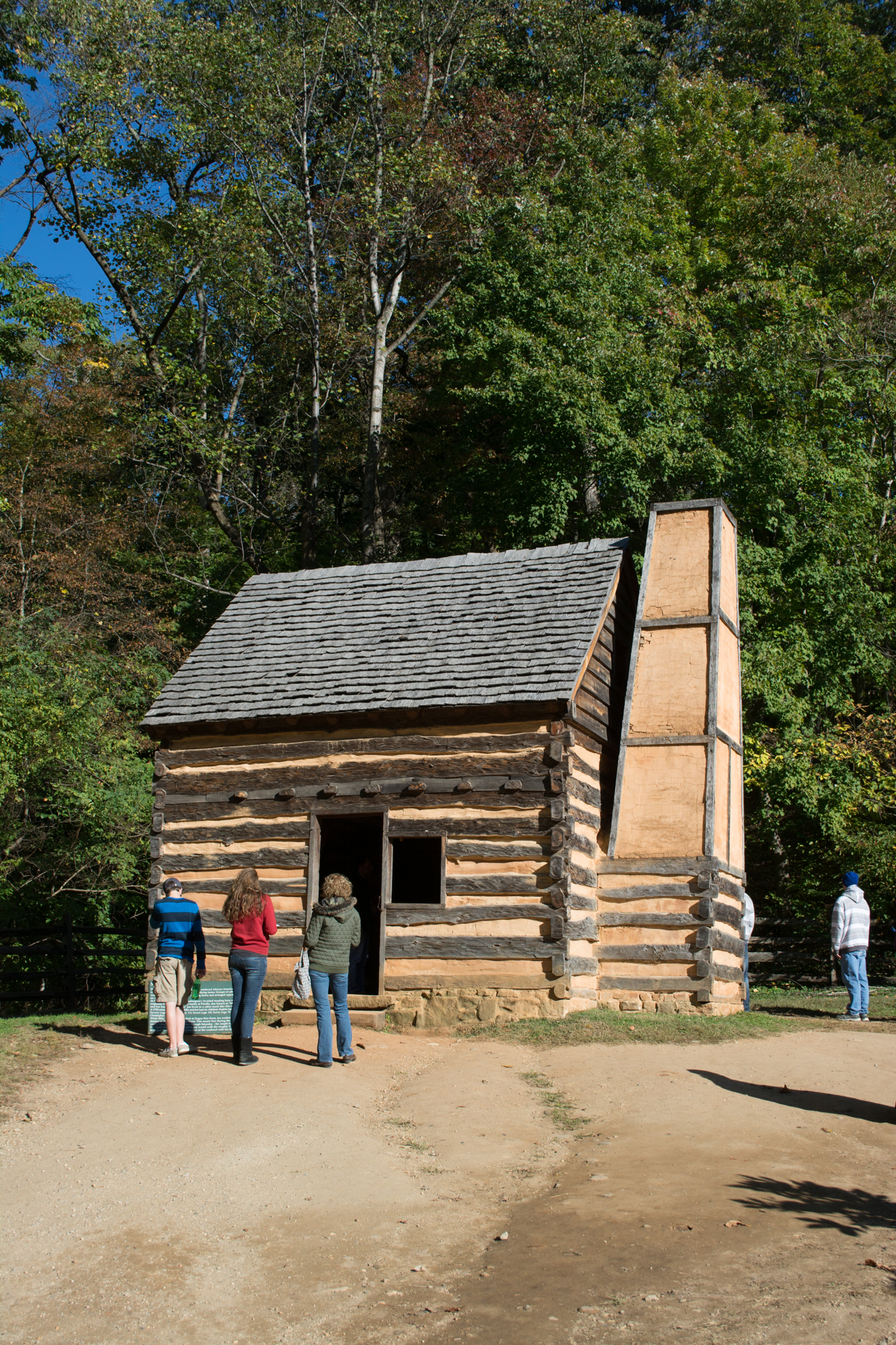
Modern reconstruction of a slave cabin at Mount Vernon

At Mansion House Farm, most of the enslaved people were housed in a two-story frame building known as the "Quarters for Families". This was replaced in 1792 by brick-built accommodation wings either side of the greenhouse comprising four rooms in total, each some 600 square feet (56 m^{2}). The Mount Vernon Ladies' Association have concluded these rooms were communal areas furnished with bunks that allowed little privacy for the predominantly male occupants. Other enslaved people at Mansion House Farm lived over the outbuildings where they worked or in log cabins. Such cabins were the standard slave accommodation at the outlying farms, comparable to the accommodation occupied by the lower strata of free white society across the Chesapeake area and by the enslaved on other Virginia plantations. They provided a single room that ranged in size from 168 square feet (15.6 m^{2}) to 246 square feet (22.9 m^{2}) to house a family. The cabins were often poorly constructed, daubed with mud for draft- and water-proofing, with dirt floors. Some cabins were built as duplexes; some single-unit cabins were small enough to be moved on carts. There are few sources which shed light on living conditions in these cabins, but one visitor in 1798 wrote, "husband and wife sleep on a mean pallet, the children on the ground; a very bad fireplace, some utensils for cooking, but in the middle of this poverty some cups and a teapot". Other sources suggest the interiors were smoky, dirty and dark, with only a shuttered opening for a window and the fireplace for illumination at night.

Washington provided his enslaved people with a blanket each fall at most, which they used for their own bedding and which they were required to use to gather leaves for livestock bedding. Enslaved people at the outlying farms were issued with a basic set of clothing each year, comparable to the clothing issued on other Virginia plantations. Slaves slept and worked in their clothes, leaving them to spend many months in garments that were worn, ripped and tattered. Domestic slaves at the main residence who came into regular contact with visitors were better clothed; butlers, waiters and body servants were dressed in a livery based on the three-piece suit of an 18th-century gentleman, and maids were provided with finer quality clothing than their counterparts in the fields.

Washington desired his enslaved workers to be fed adequately but no more. Each enslaved person was provided with a basic daily food ration of one US quart (0.95 L) or more of cornmeal, up to eight ounces (230 g) of herring and occasionally some meat, a fairly typical ration for the enslaved population in Virginia that met the calorie requirement of a young man engaged in moderately heavy agricultural labor but was nutritionally deficient. The basic ration was supplemented by enslaved people's own efforts hunting (for which some were allowed guns) and trapping game. They grew their own vegetables in small garden plots they were permitted to maintain in their own time, on which they also reared poultry.

Washington often tipped enslaved people on his visits to other estates, and it is likely that his own enslaved workers were similarly rewarded by visitors to Mount Vernon. Enslaved people occasionally earned money through their normal work or for particular services rendered – for example, Washington rewarded three of his own enslaved with cash for good service in 1775, an enslaved person received a fee for the care of a mare that was being bred in 1798 and the chef Hercules profited well by selling slops from the presidential kitchen. Enslaved people also earned money from their own endeavors, by selling to Washington or at the market in Alexandria food they had caught or grown and small items they had made. They used the proceeds to purchase from Washington or the shops in Alexandria better clothing, housewares and extra provisions such as flour, pork, whiskey, tea, coffee and sugar.

=== Family and community ===
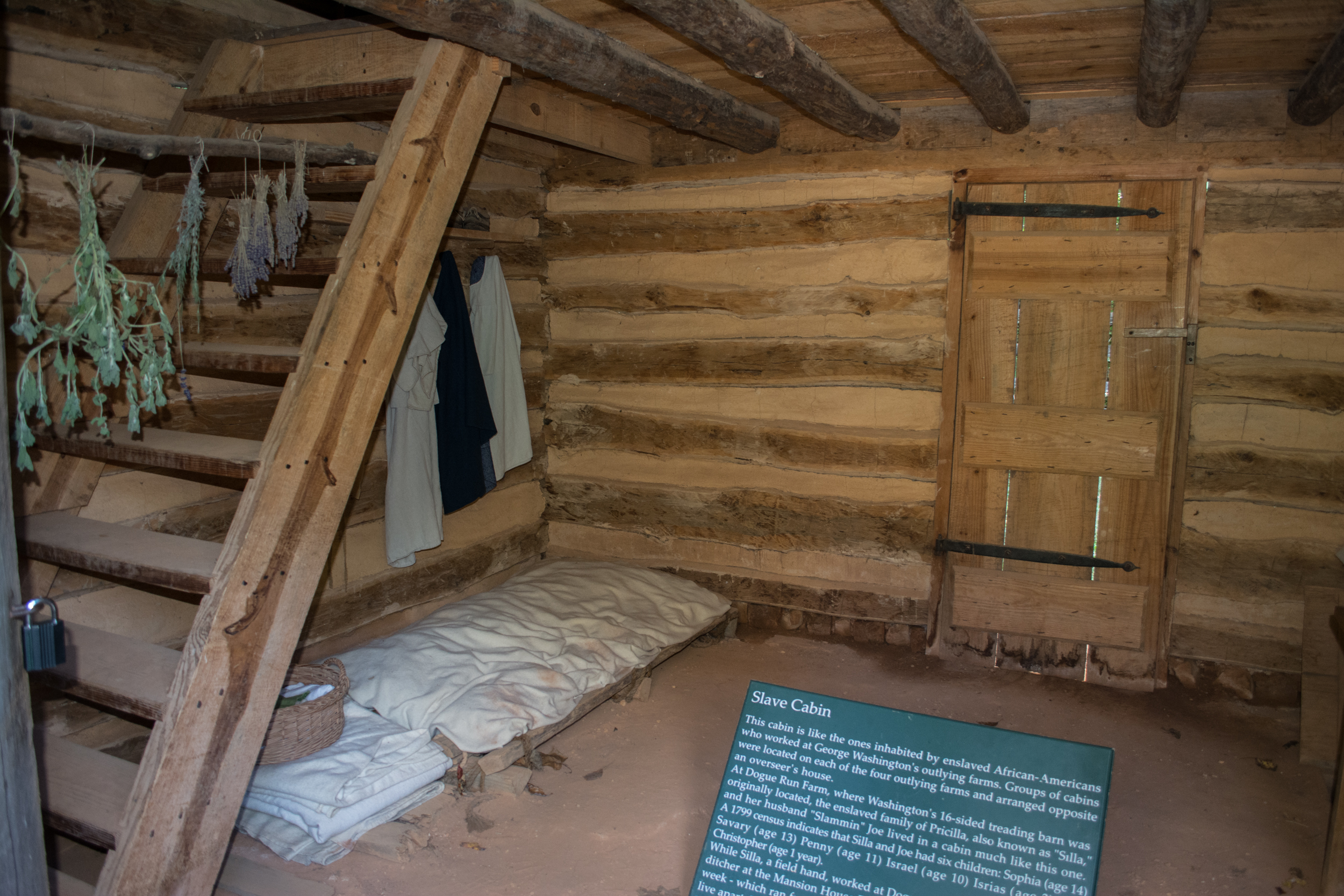
Interior of the reconstructed slave cabin at Mount Vernon

Although the law did not recognize slave marriages, Washington did, and by 1799 some two-thirds of adult slaves at Mount Vernon were married. To minimize time lost in getting to the workplace and thus increase productivity, enslaved people were accommodated at the farm on which they worked. Because of the unequal distribution of males and females across the five farms, enslaved people often found partners on different farms, and in their day-to-day lives husbands were routinely separated from their wives and children. Washington occasionally rescinded orders so as not to separate spouses, but the historian Henry Wiencek writes, "as a general management practice [Washington] institutionalized an indifference to the stability of enslaved families." Only thirty-six of the ninety-six married slaves at Mount Vernon in 1799 lived together, while thirty-eight had spouses who lived on separate farms and twenty-two had spouses who lived on other plantations. The evidence suggests couples that were separated did not regularly visit during the week, and doing so prompted complaints from Washington that enslaved people were too exhausted to work after such "night walking", leaving Saturday nights, Sundays and holidays as the main time such families could spend together. Despite the stress and anxiety caused by this indifference to family stability – on one occasion an overseer wrote that the separation of families "seems like death to them" – marriage was the foundation on which the enslaved population established their own community, and longevity in these unions was not uncommon.

Large families that covered multiple generations, along with their attendant marriages, were part of an enslaved community-building process that transcended ownership. Washington's head carpenter Isaac, for example, lived with his wife Kitty, a dower-slave milkmaid, at Mansion House Farm. The couple had nine daughters ranging in age from six to twenty-seven in 1799, and the marriages of four of those daughters had extended the family to other farms within and outside the Mount Vernon estate and produced three grandchildren. Children were born into slavery, their ownership determined by the ownership of their mothers. The value attached to the birth of an enslaved child, if it was noted at all, is indicated in the weekly report of one overseer, which stated, "Increase 9 Lambs & 1 male child of Lynnas." New mothers received a new blanket and three to five weeks of light duties to recover. An infant remained with its mother at her place of work. Older children, the majority of whom lived in single-parent households in which the mother worked from dawn to dusk, performed small family chores but were otherwise left to play largely unsupervised until they reached an age when they could begin to be put to work for Washington, usually somewhere between eleven and fourteen years old. In 1799, nearly sixty percent of the slave population was under nineteen years old and nearly thirty-five percent under nine.

There is evidence that enslaved people passed on their African cultural values through telling stories, among them the tales of Br'er Rabbit which, with their origins in Africa and stories of a powerless individual triumphing through wit and intelligence over powerful authority, would have resonated with the slaves. African-born slaves brought with them some of the religious rituals of their ancestral home, and there is an undocumented tradition of voodoo being practiced at one of the Mount Vernon farms. Although the slave condition made it impossible to adhere to the Five Pillars of Islam, some slave names indicate a Muslim cultural origin. Anglicans reached out to American-born slaves in Virginia, and some of the Mount Vernon enslaved population are known to have been christened before Washington acquired the estate. There is evidence in the historical record from 1797 that the enslaved population at Mount Vernon had contacts with Baptists, Methodists and Quakers. Those three Protestant groups advocated abolition, raising hopes of freedom among the enslaved, and the congregation of the Alexandria Baptist Church, founded in 1803, included enslaved people formerly owned by Washington.

=== Interracial sexual relations ===
External videos
- Presentation by Mary Thompson on Washington and Slavery, February 20, 1999, C-SPAN

In 1799 there were some twenty mulatto (mixed race) enslaved people at Mount Vernon. However, there is no credible evidence that George Washington had sex with any slave. (Note: There is an oral tradition among the descendants of the freedman West Ford that he was the son of Washington and Venus, an enslaved woman belonging to Washington's brother John Augustine Washington. A case made by the historian Henry Wiencek is, according to the historian Philip Morgan, "so circumstantial as to be fanciful", and there is no evidence that Washington ever met Venus, let alone fathered a child by her.)

The probability of paternal relationships between enslaved and hired white workers is indicated by some surnames: Betty and Tom Davis, probably the children of Thomas Davis, a white weaver at Mount Vernon in the 1760s; George Young, likely the son of a man of the same name who was a clerk at Mount Vernon in 1774; and Judge and her sister Delphy, the daughters of Andrew Judge, an indentured tailor at Mount Vernon in the 1770s and 1780s. There is evidence to suggest that white overseers – working in close proximity to enslaved people under the same demanding master while physically and socially isolated from their own peer group, a situation that drove some to drink – had sexual relations with the enslaved people they supervised (sex between black or white overseers and enslaved people whom they supervised was rape, assuming that consent was impossible). Some white visitors to Mount Vernon seemed to have expected enslaved women to provide sexual favors. The living arrangements left some enslaved females alone and vulnerable, and the Mount Vernon research historian Mary V. Thompson writes that relationships "could have been the result of mutual attraction and affection, very real demonstrations of power and control, or even exercises in the manipulation of an authority figure".

=== Resistance ===
1796 ad by President Washington for Ona Judge, enslaved maid of his wife Martha

Although some of the enslaved population at Mount Vernon may have come to feel loyalty towards Washington (coerced or otherwise), the resistance displayed by a significant percentage of them is indicated by the frequent assertions Washington made about "rogueries" and "old tricks". The most common act of resistance was theft (e.g. as a form of self-help) which was so common that Washington made allowances for it as part of normal wastage. Food was stolen both to supplement rations and to sell, and Washington believed the selling of tools was another source of income for enslaved people. Because cloth and clothing were commonly taken without permission, Washington required seamstresses to show the results of their work and the leftover scraps before issuing them more material. Sheep were washed before shearing to prevent the theft of wool, and storage areas were kept locked and keys left with trusted individuals. In 1792, Washington ordered the culling of enslaved people's dogs he believed were being used in a spate of livestock theft and ruled that enslaved people who kept dogs without authorization were to be "severely punished" and their dogs hanged.

Another means by which enslaved people resisted, one that was virtually impossible to prove, was feigning illness. Over the years Washington became increasingly skeptical about absenteeism due to sickness among his enslaved population and concerned about the diligence or ability of his overseers in recognizing genuine cases of physical illness. Between 1792 and 1794, while Washington was away from Mount Vernon as President, the number of days lost to sickness increased tenfold compared to 1786, when he was resident at Mount Vernon and able to exert control over the situation personally. In one case, Washington suspected an enslaved person of frequently avoiding work over a period of decades through acts of deliberate self harm.

Enslaved people asserted some independence and frustrated Washington by the pace and quality of their work. In 1760, Washington noted that four of his carpenters quadrupled their output of timber under his personal supervision. Thirty-five years later, he denigrated his carpenters as an "idle...set of rascals" who would take a month or more to complete at Mount Vernon work that was being done in two or three days in Philadelphia. The output of seamstresses dropped off when Martha was away, and spinners found they could slow their pace by playing the overseers off against her. Tools were regularly lost or damaged, thus stopping work, and Washington despaired of employing innovations that might improve efficiency because he assumed enslaved workers were too clumsy to operate the new machinery involved.

The most emphatic act of resistance was to run away, and between 1760 and 1799 at least forty-seven enslaved people under Washington's control did so. Seventeen of these, fourteen men and three women, escaped to a British warship that anchored in the Potomac River near Mount Vernon in 1781. In general, the best chance for a successful escape lay with second- or third-generation African-American enslaved people who had good English, possessed skills that would allow them to support themselves as free people and were in close enough contact with their masters to receive special privileges. Oney Judge, who was an especially talented seamstress, and Hercules Posey escaped in 1796 and 1797 respectively and eluded recapture. Washington took seriously the recapture of these brave fugitives, and in three cases enslaved people who had escaped were sold off in the West Indies after recapture, effectively a death sentence in the severe conditions the enslaved were subjected to there. He was "furious" at Ona Judge's escape and had emissaries try to recapture Ona Judge in New Hampshire in 1796 and 1799, without success.

=== Control ===
Slavery was a system in which enslaved people lived in fear; fear of being sold, fear of being separated from their families or their children or their parents, fear of not being in control of their bodies or their lives, fear of never knowing freedom. No matter what their clothing was like, no matter what food they ate, no matter what their quarters looked like, enslaved people lived with that fear. And that was the psychological violence of slavery. That's how slave owners maintained control over enslaved people.

— Jessie MacLeod
Associate Curator
George Washington's Mount Vernon

Washington used both reward and punishment to encourage discipline and productivity in his enslaved population. In one case, he suggested "admonition and advice" would be more effective than "further correction", and he occasionally appealed to an enslaved person's sense of pride to encourage better performance. Rewards in the form of better blankets and clothing fabric were given to the "most deserving", and there are examples of cash payments being awarded for good behavior. He opposed the use of the lash in principle, but saw the practice as a necessary evil and sanctioned its occasional use, generally as a last resort, on enslaved people, both male and female, if they did not, in his words, "do their duty by fair means". There are accounts of carpenters being whipped in 1758 when the overseer "could see a fault", of an enslaved person called Jemmy being whipped for stealing corn and escaping in 1773 and of a seamstress called Charlotte being whipped in 1793 by an overseer "determined to lower Spirit or skin her Back" for impudence and refusing to work.

Washington regarded the 'passion' with which one of his overseers administered floggings to be counter-productive, and Charlotte's protest that she had not been whipped in fourteen years indicates the frequency with which physical punishment was used. Whippings were administered by overseers after review, a system Washington required to ensure enslaved people were spared capricious and extreme punishment. Washington did not himself flog enslaved people, but he did at times use verbal abuse and physical violence when they failed to perform as he expected. (Note: In an 1833 interview, Washington's nephew Lawrence Lewis related a conversation with one of Washington's carpenters who reported an incident where, having made a mistake, he was given "such a slap on the side of my head that I whirled round like a top". If a valet failed to properly clean Washington's boots ready for the morning, "the servant got them about his head but without the Genl. betraying any excitement beyond the effort of the moment – in a minute afterwards he was no less calm & collected than usual.") Contemporaries generally described Washington as having a calm demeanor, but there are several reports from those who knew him privately that mention his temper. One wrote that "in private and particularly with his servants, its violence sometimes broke out". Another reported that Washington's servants "seemed to watch his eye and to anticipate his every wish; hence a look was equivalent to a command". Threats of demotion to fieldwork, corporal punishment and being shipped to the West Indies were part of the system by which he controlled his enslaved population.

=== Notable enslaved people at Mount Vernon ===
Notable individuals George Washington enslaved at Mount Vernon include:

- Betty
- Caroline Branham
- William Costin
- Ona Judge
- Philip Lee
- William Lee
- Hercules Posey
- Christopher Sheels
- Deborah Squash
- Harry Washington

== Evolution of Washington's attitudes ==
Washington's early views on slavery were no different from any Virginia planter of the time. He demonstrated no moral qualms about the institution, and referred to slaves as "a Species of Property" during those years as he would later in life when he favored abolition. The economics of slavery prompted the first doubts in Washington about the institution, marking the beginning of a slow evolution in his attitude towards it. By 1766, he had transitioned his business from the labor-intensive planting of tobacco to the less demanding farming of grain crops. His slaves were employed on a greater variety of tasks that needed more skills than tobacco planting required of them; as well as the cultivation of grains and vegetables, they were employed in cattle herding, spinning, weaving and carpentry. Some scholars have asserted that the transition left Washington with a surplus of slaves and revealed to him the inefficiencies of the slave labor system, but another view is that the transition did not result in a surplus of slaves because Washington found other productive work for them.

There is little evidence that Washington seriously questioned the ethics of slavery before the Revolution. In the 1760s he often participated in tavern lotteries, events in which defaulters' debts were settled by raffling off their assets to a high-spirited crowd. In 1769, Washington co-managed one such lottery in which fifty-five slaves were sold, among them six families and five women with children. The more valuable married males were raffled together with their wives and children; less valuable slaves were separated from their families into different lots. Robin and Bella, for example, were raffled together as husband and wife while their children, twelve-year-old Sukey and seven-year-old Betty, were listed in a separate lot. Only chance dictated whether the family would remain together, and with 1,840 tickets on sale the odds were not good.

External videos
- Presentation by Henry Wiencek on An Imperfect God, February 20, 2013, C-SPAN

The historian Henry Wiencek concludes that the repugnance Washington felt at this cruelty in which he had participated prompted his decision not to break up slave families by sale or purchase, and marks the beginning of a transformation in Washington's thinking about the morality of slavery. Wiencek writes that in 1775 Washington took more slaves than he needed rather than break up the family of a slave he had agreed to accept in payment of a debt. The historians Philip D. Morgan and Peter Henriques (Note: Henriques is Professor of History Emeritus at George Mason University and member of the Mount Vernon committee of George Washington Scholars.) are skeptical of Wiencek's conclusion and believe there is no evidence of any change in Washington's moral thinking at this stage. Morgan writes that in 1772, Washington was "all business" and "might have been buying livestock" in purchasing more slaves who were to be, in Washington's words, "strait Limb'd, & in every respect strong & likely, with good Teeth & good Countenance". Morgan gives a different account of the 1775 purchase, writing that Washington resold the slave because of the slave's resistance to being separated from family and that the decision to do so was "no more than the conventional piety of large Virginia planters who usually said they did not want to break up slave families – and often did it anyway".

=== American Revolution ===
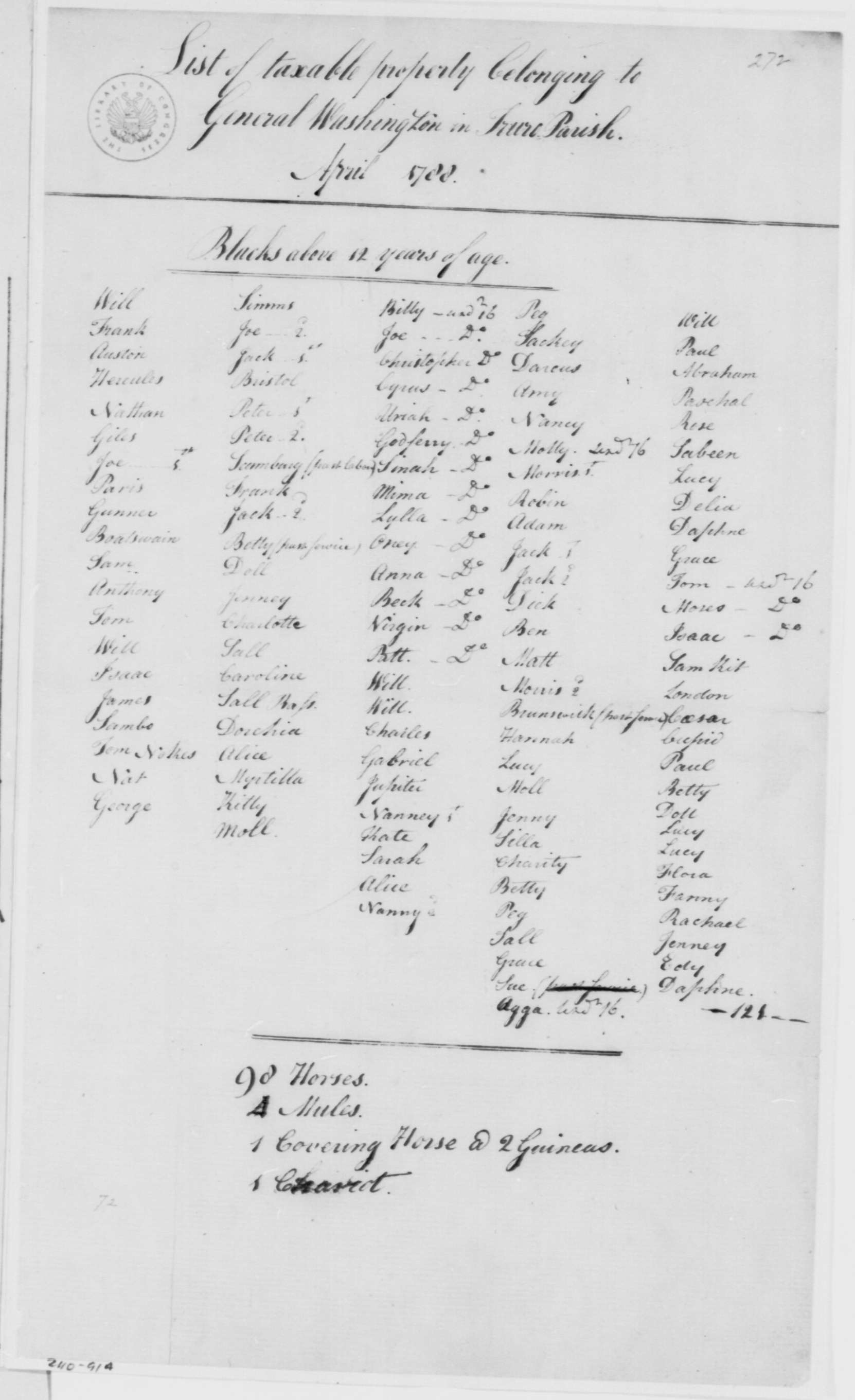
Washington's taxable property in April 1788: 121 slaves ("Blacks above 12 years of age"), 98 horses, 4 mules, 1 stud ("covering horse") and 1 chariot

From the late 1760s, Washington became increasingly radicalized against the North American colonies' subservient status within the British Empire. In 1774 he was a key participant in the adoption of the Fairfax Resolves which, alongside the assertion of colonial rights, condemned the transatlantic slave trade on moral grounds. Washington was a signatory to that entire document, and thus publicly endorsed clause 17 "declaring our earnest wishes to see an entire stop forever put to such wicked, cruel, and unnatural trade."

He began to express the growing rift with Great Britain in terms of slavery, stating in the summer of 1774 that the British authorities were "endeavouring by every piece of Art & despotism to fix the Shackles of Slavry [sic]" upon the colonies. Two years later, on taking command of the Continental Army at Cambridge at the start of the American Revolutionary War, he wrote in orders to his troops that "it is a noble Cause we are engaged in, it is the Cause of virtue and mankind...freedom or Slavery must be the result of our conduct." The hypocrisy or paradox inherent in slave owners characterizing a war of independence as a struggle for their own freedom from slavery was not lost on the British writer Samuel Johnson, who asked, "How is it that we hear the loudest yelps for liberty among the drivers of Negroes?" As if answering Johnson, Washington wrote to a friend in August 1774, "The crisis is arrived when we must assert our rights, or submit to every imposition that can be heaped upon us, till custom and use shall make us tame and abject slaves, as the blacks we rule over with such arbitrary sway."

Washington shared the common Southern concern among white people about arming African Americans, enslaved or free, and initially refused to accept either into the ranks of the Continental Army. He reversed his position on free African Americans when the royal governor of Virginia, Lord Dunmore, issued a proclamation in November 1775 offering freedom to rebel-owned slaves who enlisted in the British forces. Three years later and facing acute manpower shortages, Washington approved a Rhode Island initiative to raise a battalion of African-American soldiers.

Washington gave a cautious response to a 1779 proposal from his young aide John Laurens for the recruitment of 3,000 South Carolinian enslaved workers who would be rewarded with emancipation. He was concerned that such a move would prompt the British to do the same, leading to an arms race in which the Americans would be at a disadvantage, and that it would promote discontent among those who remained enslaved. (Note: South Carolinian leaders were outraged when Congress passed resolutions, which Wiencek suggests was the first Emancipation Proclamation, supporting the proposal and threatened to withdraw from the war if it was enacted. Washington had known the scheme would encounter significant resistance in South Carolina, and was not surprised when it eventually failed. Wiencek discusses the possibility that Washington's concern about slave discontent following the recruitment of South Carolinian slaves would spread to his own slaves and therefore "resisted a recruitment plan that might lead to the loss of his property, despite compelling military necessity".) In 1780, he suggested to one of his commanders the integration of African-American recruits "to abolish the name and appearance of a Black Corps."

During the war, some 5,000 African Americans served in a Continental Army that was more integrated than any American force before the Vietnam War, and another 1,000 served in the Continental Navy. They represented less than three percent of all American forces mobilized, though in 1778 they provided as much as 13% of the Continental Army. By the end of the war African-Americans were serving alongside whites in virtually all units other than those raised in the deep south.

The first indication of a shift in Washington's attitude on slavery appeared during the war, in correspondence of 1778 and 1779 with Lund Washington, who managed Mount Vernon in Washington's absence. In the exchange of letters, a conflicted Washington expressed a desire "to get quit of Negroes", but made clear his reluctance to sell them at a public venue and his wish that "husband and wife, and Parents and children are not separated from each other". His determination not to separate families became a major complication in his deliberations on the sale, purchase and, in due course, emancipation of his own slaves. Washington's restrictions put Lund in a difficult position with two female slaves he had already all but sold in 1778, and Lund's irritation was evident in his request to Washington for clear instructions. Despite Washington's reluctance to break up families, there is little evidence that moral considerations played any part in his thinking at this stage. He sought to liberate himself from an economically unviable system, not to liberate his slaves. They were still a property from which he expected to profit. During a period of severe wartime depreciation, the question was not whether to sell his enslaved people, but when, where, and how best to sell them. Lund sold nine enslaved people, including the two women, in January 1779.

Washington's actions at the war's end reveal little in the way of antislavery inclinations. He was anxious to recover his own slaves, and refused to consider British offers of compensation for the upwards of 80,000 formerly enslaved people evacuated by the British; Washington insisted without success that the British return them to their owners as per a clause in the Preliminary Articles of Peace which prohibited the British from "carrying away any Negroes, or other Property of the American Inhabitants". Before resigning his commission in 1783, Washington took the opportunity to give his opinion on the challenges that threatened the existence of the new nation, in his Circular to the States. That circular letter inveighed against "local prejudices" but explicitly declined to name any of them, "leaving the last to the good sense and serious consideration of those immediately concerned."

=== Confederation years ===
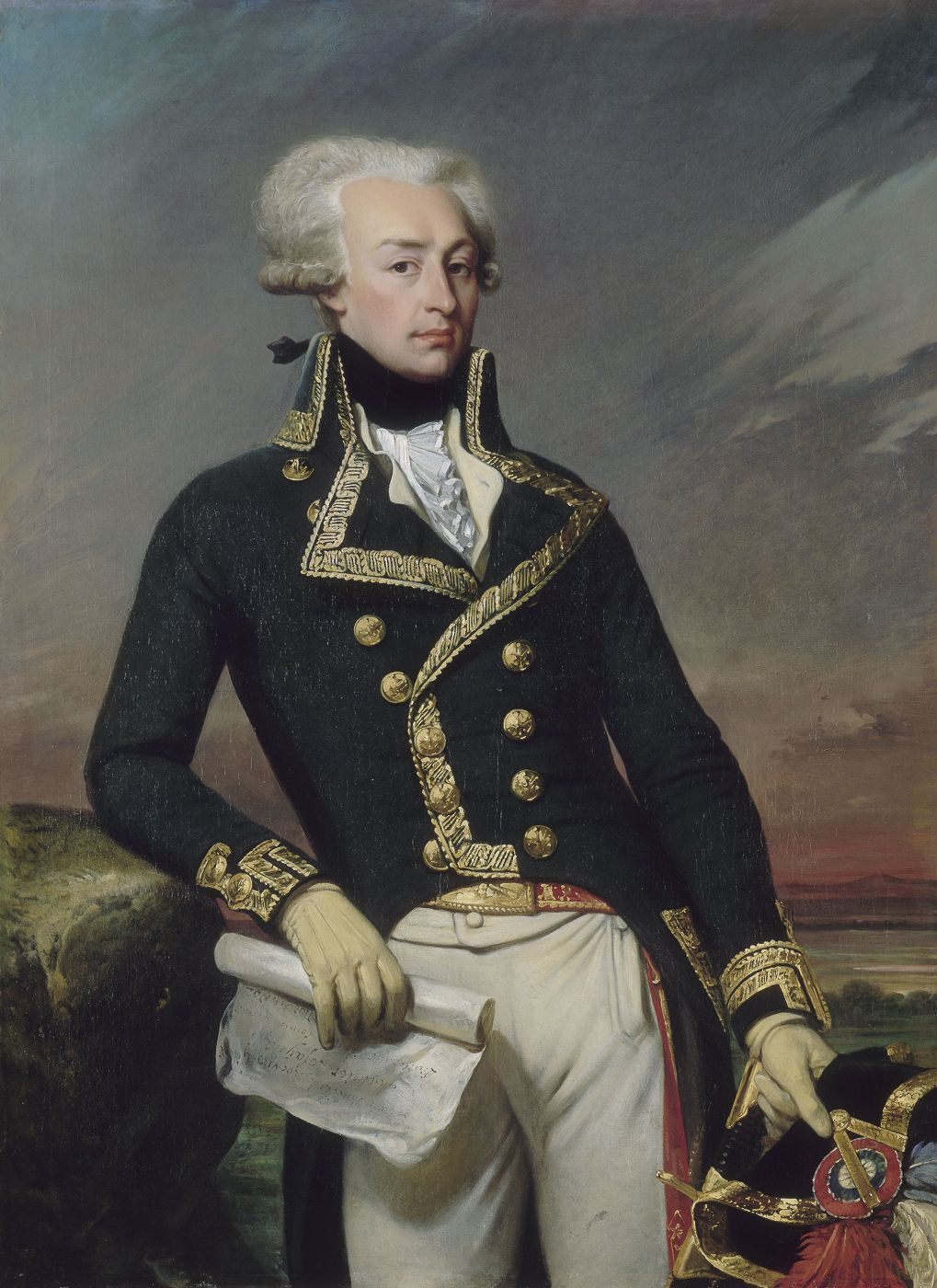
The Marquis de Lafayette

Emancipation became a major issue in Virginia after liberalization in 1782 of the law regarding manumission, which is the act of an owner freeing his slaves. Before 1782, a manumission had required obtaining consent from the state legislature, which was arduous and rarely granted. After 1782, inspired by the rhetoric that had driven the revolution, it became popular to free slaves. The free African-American population in Virginia rose from some 3,000 to more than 20,000 between 1780 and 1800; the 1800 United States census tallied about 350,000 slaves in Virginia, and the proslavery interest re-asserted itself around that time. The historian Kenneth Morgan writes, "...the revolutionary war was the crucial turning-point in [Washington's] thinking about slavery. After 1783...he began to express inner tensions about the problem of slavery more frequently, though always in private..." Although Philip Morgan identifies several turning points and believes no single one was pivotal, (Note: Philip Morgan identifies four turning points: the switch from tobacco to grain crops in the 1760s and the realization of the economic inefficiencies of the institution; the broadening of Washington's horizons during the American Revolution and the principles on which it was fought; the influence of abolitionists such as Lafayette, Coke, Asbury and Pleasants in the mid 1780s and Washington's support for abolition by a gradual legislative process; and Washington's attempts to disentangle himself from slavery in the mid 1790s.) most historians agree the Revolution was central to the evolution of Washington's attitudes on slavery. It is likely that revolutionary rhetoric about the rights of men, the close contact with young antislavery officers who served with Washington – such as Laurens, the Marquis de Lafayette and Alexander Hamilton – and the influence of northern colleagues were contributory factors in that process. (Note: In their general histories, the historians Joseph Ellis and John E. Ferling include Washington's experience of seeing African-Americans fighting for the cause as another factor.)

Washington was drawn into the postwar abolitionist discourse through his contacts with antislavery friends, their transatlantic network of leading abolitionists and the literature produced by the antislavery movement, though he was reluctant to volunteer his own opinion on the matter and generally did so only when the subject was first raised with him. At his death, Washington's extensive library included at least seventeen publications on slavery. Six of them had been collated into an expensively bound volume titled Tracts on Slavery, indicating that he attached some importance to that selection. Five of the six were published in or after 1788. (Note: Tracts on Slavery was one volume in a set of thirty-six that Washington had bound probably sometime after 1795. The volumes covered subjects that generally were of importance to him, such as agriculture, the Revolution, the Society of the Cincinnati and politics. The single pre-1788 pamphlet of the six in Tracts on Slavery was A Serious Address to the Rulers of America, on the Inconsistency of Their Conduct Respecting Slavery, published in 1783. It was the first pamphlet in the volume, and Washington had written his signature on the cover, as he did with the first pamphlet in each of the thirty-six volumes. Of the eleven pamphlets on slavery that were, presumably, not considered to be worth binding, eight were published before 1788. One of them, published in 1785, was never read. The implication is that Washington became more interested in the subject in the early 1790s.) All six shared common themes that slaves first had to be educated about the obligations of liberty before they could be emancipated, a belief Washington is reported to have expressed himself in 1798, and that abolition should be realized by a gradual legislative process, an idea that began to appear in Washington's correspondence during the Confederation period.

Washington was not impressed by what Dorothy Twohig – a former editor-in-chief of The Washington Papers – described as the "imperious demands" and "evangelical piety" of Quaker efforts to advance abolition, and in 1786 he complained about their "tamper[ing] with & seduc[ing]" slaves who "are happy & content to remain with their present masters". Only the most radical of abolitionists called for immediate emancipation. Immediate (instead of gradual) emancipation would have quickly cured a grave injustice, but cautious abolitionists feared that sudden emancipation would also disrupt the labor market, as well as disrupting those elderly and infirm people whom slaveholders had been required to care for. Large numbers of unemployed poor, of whatever color, was a cause for concern in 18th-century America, to the extent that expulsion and foreign resettlement was often part of the discourse on emancipation. A sudden end to slavery would also have caused a significant financial loss to slaveowners whose human property represented a valuable asset. Gradual emancipation was seen as a way of mitigating such a loss and reducing opposition from those with a financial self-interest in maintaining slavery.

In 1783, Lafayette proposed a joint venture to establish an experimental settlement for freed slaves which, with Washington's example, "might render it a general practise", but Washington demurred. As Lafayette forged ahead with his plan, Washington offered encouragement but expressed concern in 1786 about "much inconvenience and mischief" an abrupt emancipation might generate, and he gave no tangible support to the idea. (Note: The two discussed slavery when Lafayette visited Washington at Mount Vernon in August 1784, though Washington thought the time was not yet ripe for a resolution and questioned how a Virginia plantation could be run without slave labor. On returning to France, Lafayette purchased a plantation in the French colony of Cayenne, modern-day French Guiana, and advised Washington of his progress by letter in 1786. Lafayette had taken concerns about the abrupt emancipation of slaves into account, paying and educating the slaves he settled on the plantation before freeing them. He became a leading figure in the French movement against the slave trade and a corresponding member of the British movement. Washington would not have known of Lafayette's antislavery activities in Cayenne or Europe from Lafayette himself; although the two continued to correspond for the rest of Washington's life, the subject of slavery virtually disappeared from their letters. The Cayenne experiment came to an end in 1792, when the plantation was sold by the French Revolutionary government after Lafayette's imprisonment by the Austrians.)

Washington expressed support for emancipation legislation to prominent Methodists Thomas Coke and Francis Asbury in 1785, but declined to sign their petition which (as Coke put it) asked "the General Assembly of Virginia, to pass a law for the immediate or gradual emancipation of all the slaves". Washington privately conveyed his support for such legislation to most of the great men of Virginia, and promised to comment publicly on the matter by letter to the Virginia Assembly if the Assembly would begin serious deliberation about the Methodists' petition. The historian Lacy Ford writes that Washington may have dissembled: "In all likelihood, Washington was honest about his general desire for gradual emancipation but dissembled about his willingness to speak publicly on its behalf; the Mount Vernon master almost certainly reasoned that the legislature would table the petition immediately and thus release him from any obligation to comment publicly on the matter." The measure was rejected without any dissent in the Virginia House of Delegates, because abolitionist legislators quickly backed down rather than suffer inevitable defeat. Washington wrote in despair to Lafayette: "Some petitions were presented to the Assembly at its last session for the abolition of slavery, but they could scarce obtain a reading." James Thomas Flexner's interpretation is somewhat different from Lacy Ford's: "Washington was willing to back publicly the Methodists' petition for gradual emancipation if the proposal showed the slightest possibility of being given consideration by the Virginia legislature." Flexner adds that, if Washington had been more audacious in pursuing emancipation in Virginia, then "he undoubtedly would have failed to achieve the end of slavery, and he would certainly have made impossible the role he played in the Constitutional Convention and the Presidency."

Henriques identifies Washington's concern for the judgement of posterity as a significant factor in Washington's thinking on slavery, writing, "No man had a greater desire for secular immortality, and [Washington] understood that his place in history would be tarnished by his ownership of slaves." Philip Morgan similarly identifies the importance of Washington's driving ambition for fame and public respect as a man of honor; in December 1785, the Quaker and fellow Virginian Robert Pleasants "[hit] Washington where it hurt most", Morgan writes, when he told Washington that to remain a slaveholder would forever tarnish his reputation. (Note: John Rhodehamel, former archivist at Mount Vernon and curator of American historical manuscripts at the Huntington Library, characterizes Washington as someone who desired "above all else the kind of fame that meant a lasting reputation as a man of honor." According to Gordon S. Wood, "Many of [Washington's] actions after 1783 can be understood only in terms of this deep concern for his reputation as a virtuous leader." Ron Chernow writes, "...the thought of his high destined niche in history was never far from [Washington's] mind.") In correspondence the next year with Maryland politician John Francis Mercer, Washington expressed "great repugnance" at buying slaves, stated that he would not buy any more "unless some peculiar circumstances should compel me to it" and made clear his desire to see the institution of slavery ended by a gradual legislative process. He expressed his support for abolitionist legislation privately, but widely, sharing those views with leading Virginians, and with other leaders including Mercer and founding father Robert Morris of Pennsylvania to whom Washington wrote:

I can only say that there is not a man living who wishes more sincerely than I do, to see a plan adopted for the abolition of it – but there is only one proper and effectual mode by which it can be accomplished, and that is by Legislative authority: and this, as far as my suffrage will go, shall never be wanting.

Washington still needed labor to work his farms, and there was little alternative to slavery. Hired labor south of Pennsylvania was scarce and expensive, and the Revolution had cut off the supply of indentured servants and convict labor from Great Britain. Washington significantly reduced his slave purchases after the war, though it is not clear whether this was a moral or practical decision; he repeatedly stated that his inventory and its potential progeny were adequate for his current and foreseeable needs. Nevertheless, he negotiated with John Mercer to accept six slaves in payment of a debt in 1786 and expressed to Henry Lee a desire to purchase a bricklayer the next year. (Note: The sources are contradictory on Washington's negotiations to accept slaves from Mercer in settlement of a debt. Kenneth Morgan states that Washington purchased the slaves, as does Twohig, though she reports five slaves. Philip Morgan states that the negotiations with Mercer fell through, as does Hirschfeld. Peter Henriques reports that Washington purchased a bricklayer in 1787, but Kenneth Morgan, Twohig and Hirschfeld report only on negotiations to buy one without confirming that he did.) In 1788, Washington acquired thirty-three slaves from the estate of Bartholomew Dandridge in settlement of a debt and left them with Dandridge's widow on her estate at Pamocra, New Kent County, Virginia. Later the same year, he declined a suggestion from the leading French abolitionist Jacques Brissot to form and become president of an abolitionist society in Virginia, stating that although he was in favor of such a society and would support it, the time was not yet right to confront the issue. Historian James Flexner has written that, generally speaking, "Washington limited himself to stating that, if an authentic movement toward emancipation could be started in Virginia, he would spring to its support. No such movement could be started."

=== Creation of the U.S. Constitution ===
Washington presided over the Constitutional Convention in 1787, during which it became obvious how explosive the slavery issue was, and how willing the antislavery faction was to accept the preservation of this oppressive institution to ensure national unity and the establishment of a strong federal government. The Constitution allowed but did not require the preservation of slavery, and it deliberately avoided use of the word "slave" which could have been interpreted as authorizing the treatment of human beings as property throughout the country. Each state was allowed to keep it, change it, or eliminate it as they wished, though Congress could make various policies that would affect this decision in each state. As of 1776, slavery was legal in all 13 colonies, but by Washington's death in December 1799 there were eight free states and nine slave states, and that split was considered entirely constitutional.

The support of the southern states for the new constitution was secured by granting them concessions that protected slavery, including the Fugitive Slave Clause, plus clauses that promised Congress would not prohibit the transatlantic slave trade for twenty years, and that empowered (but did not require) Congress to authorize suppression of insurrections such as slave rebellions. The Constitution also included the Three-Fifths Compromise which cut both ways: for purposes of taxation and representation, three out of every five slaves would be counted, which meant that each slave state would have to pay less taxes but would also have less representation in Congress than if every slave was counted. After the convention, Washington's support was critical for getting the states to ratify the document.

=== Presidential years ===
The unfortunate condition of the persons, whose labour in part I employed, has been the only unavoidable subject of regret. To make the Adults among them as easy & as comfortable in their circumstances as their actual state of ignorance & improvidence would admit; & to lay a foundation to prepare the rising generation for a destiny different from that in which they were born; afforded some satisfaction to my mind, & could not I hoped be displeasing to the justice of the Creator.

— Statement attributed to George Washington that appears in the notebook of David Humphreys, c.1788/1789

Washington's preeminent position ensured that any actions he took with regard to his own slaves would become a statement in a national debate about slavery that threatened to divide the country. Wiencek suggests Washington considered making precisely such a statement on taking up the presidency in 1789. A passage in the notebook of Washington's biographer David Humphreys (Note: Humphreys was a former aide to Washington and had begun an eighteen-month stay at Mount Vernon in 1787 to assist Washington with his correspondence and write his biography.) dated to late 1788 or early 1789 recorded a statement that resembled the emancipation clause in Washington's will a decade later. Wiencek argues the passage was a draft for a public announcement Washington was considering in which he would declare the emancipation of some of his slaves. It marks, Wiencek believes, a moral epiphany in Washington's thinking, the moment he decided not only to emancipate his slaves but also to use the occasion to set the example Lafayette had urged in 1783. Other historians dispute Wiencek's conclusion; Henriques and Joseph Ellis concur with Philip Morgan's opinion that Washington experienced no epiphanies in a "long and hard-headed struggle" in which there was no single turning point. Morgan argues that Humphreys' passage is the "private expression of remorse" from a man unable to extricate himself from the "tangled web" of "mutual dependency" on slavery, and that Washington believed public comment on such a divisive subject was best avoided for the sake of national unity. (Note: Wiencek bases his argument on the fact that the passage was written in the past tense and appears in Humphreys' notebook amid drafts Humphreys had written for public statements Washington was to make about assuming the presidency. Philip Morgan points out that the passage was Humphreys' words in Washington's voice and appears just after a summary Humphreys had written of Thomas Clarkson's 1788 An Essay on the Impolicy of the African Slave Trade. Kenneth Morgan characterizes the passage as "a remark made in [Washington's] voice by David Humphreys". Fritz Hirschfeld writes that the passage was written by Humphreys during direct dictation or from memory of Washington's exact words, and believes it highly improbable that they were not Washington's own words.)

==== As president ====
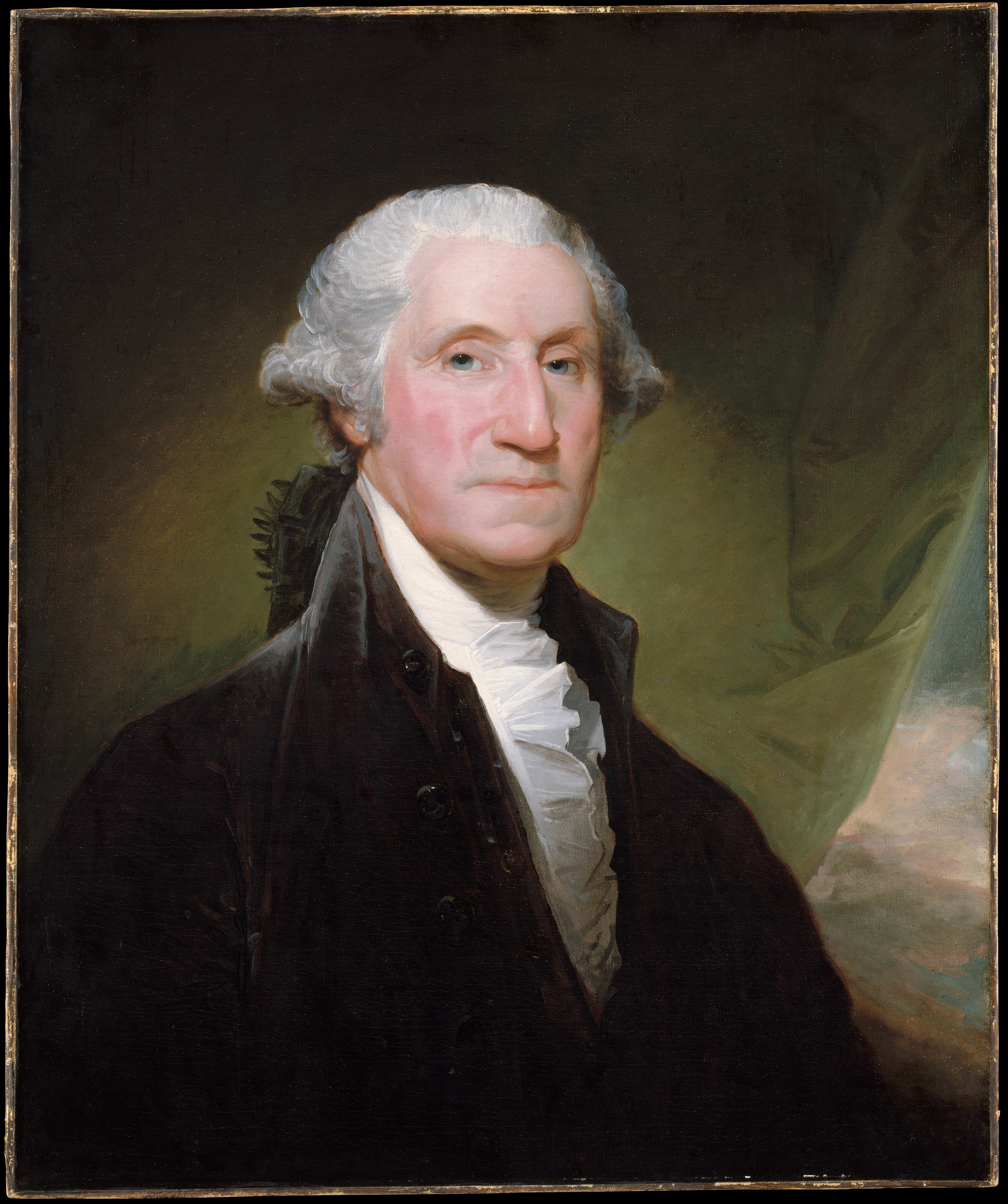
President George Washington by Gilbert Stuart (1795)

Washington took up the presidency at a time when revolutionary sentiment against slavery was giving way to a resurgence of proslavery interests. No state considered making slavery an issue during the ratification of the new constitution, southern states reinforced their slavery legislation and prominent antislavery figures were muted about the issue in public. Washington understood there was little widespread organized support for abolition. He had a keen sense both of the fragility of the fledgling Republic and of his place as a unifying figure, and he was determined not to endanger either by confronting an issue as divisive and entrenched as slavery.

He was president of a government that provided materiel and financial support for French efforts to suppress the Saint Domingue slave revolt in 1791, and which also implemented the proslavery Fugitive Slave Act of 1793. The Fugitive Slave Act gave effect to the Constitution's Fugitive Slave Clause and Extradition Clause, the Act was passed overwhelmingly in Congress (e.g. the vote was 48 to 7 in the House), it was then signed by Washington, and the Act was decried by free blacks who correctly believed it would allow bounty hunting and kidnapping. Although the wording of the act required anyone seized as a fugitive slave to be taken before a judge or magistrate to certify the seizure before removing them from the state, this requirement was often ignored in practice. Indeed, the Act was written amidst a controversy about a free black man named John Davis who was kidnapped from Pennsylvania and brought to Virginia, but the Act did not even resolve that controversy; the kidnappers from Virginia were never extradited to Pennsylvania, and John Davis remained a slave.

On the anti-slavery side of the ledger, in August 1789 Washington signed a reenactment of the 1787 Northwest Ordinance which had freed all new slaves brought after 1787 into a vast expanse of federal territory north of the Ohio River, except for slaves escaping from slave states. That 1787 law had lapsed when the new U.S. Constitution was ratified in March 1789, and Congress reaffirmed it with the Northwest Ordinance of 1789, which included the slavery restriction. Washington also signed into law the Slave Trade Act of 1794 that banned the involvement of American ships and American exporters in the international slave trade. Moreover, according to Washington biographer James Thomas Flexner, Washington as President weakened slavery by favoring Hamilton's economic plans over Jefferson's agrarian economics.

Washington never spoke publicly on the issue of slavery during his eight years as president, nor did he respond to, much less act upon, any of the antislavery petitions he received. He described a February 1790 Quaker petition to Congress urging an immediate end to the slave trade as "an illjudged piece of business" that "occasioned a great waste of time", although historian Paul F. Boller has observed that Congress extensively debated that petition only to conclude it had no power to do anything about it, so "The Quaker Memorial may have been a waste of time so far as immediate practical results were concerned." Washington endorsed James Madison's maneuvering in the House to table any discussion of ending the slave trade until 1808, as specified by the Constitution. His abolitionist aspirations for the nation centered around the hope that slavery would disappear naturally over time with the prohibition of slave imports in 1808, the earliest date such legislation could be passed as agreed at the Constitutional Convention.

Late in his presidency, Washington told his Secretary of State, Edmund Randolph, that in the event of a confrontation between North and South, he had "made up his mind to remove and be of the Northern" (i.e. leave Virginia and move up north). In 1798, he imagined just such a conflict when he said, "I can clearly foresee that nothing but the rooting out of slavery can perpetuate the existence of our union." But there is no indication Washington ever favored an immediate rather than gradual end to slavery. Indeed, the gradual dying out of slavery remained possible, until Eli Whitney invented the cotton gin in 1793 which led within five years to a vastly greater demand for slave labor.

==== As Virginia farmer ====
As well as political caution, economic imperatives remained an important consideration with regard to Washington's personal position as a slaveholder and his efforts to free himself from his dependency on slavery. He was one of the largest debtors in Virginia at the end of the war, and by 1787 the business at Mount Vernon had failed to make a profit for more than a decade. Persistently poor crop yields due to pestilence and poor weather, the cost of renovations at his Mount Vernon residence, the expense of entertaining a constant stream of visitors, the failure of Lund to collect rent from Washington's tenant farmers and wartime depreciation all helped to make Washington cash poor.

It is demonstrably clear that on this Estate I have more working Negroes by a full moiety, than can be employed to any advantage in the farming system; and I shall never turn to Planter thereon...To sell the surplus I cannot, because I am principled against this kind of traffic in the human species...

— George Washington to Robert Lewis, August 17, 1799

The overheads of maintaining a surplus of slaves, including the care of the young and elderly, made a substantial contribution to his financial difficulties. In 1786, the ratio of productive to non-productive slaves was approaching 1:1, and the c. 7,300-acre (3,000 ha) Mount Vernon estate was being operated with 122 working slaves. Although the ratio had improved by 1799 to around 2:1, the Mount Vernon estate had grown by only 10 percent to some 8,000 acres (3,200 ha) while the working slave population had grown by 65 percent to 201. It was a trend that threatened to bankrupt Washington. The slaves Washington had bought early in the development of his business were beyond their prime and nearly impossible to sell, and from 1782 Virginia law made slaveowners liable for the financial support of slaves they freed who were too young, too old or otherwise incapable of working.

During his second term, Washington began planning for a retirement that would provide him "tranquillity with a certain income". In December 1793, he sought the aid of the British agriculturalist Arthur Young in finding farmers to whom he would lease all but one of his farms, on which his slaves would then be employed as laborers. The next year, he instructed his secretary Tobias Lear to sell his western lands, ostensibly to consolidate his operations and put his financial affairs in order. Washington concluded his instructions to Lear with a private passage in which he expressed repugnance at owning slaves and declared that the principal reason for selling the land was to raise the finances that would allow him to liberate them. It is the first clear indication that Washington's thinking had shifted from selling his slaves to freeing them. In November the same year (1794), Washington declared in a letter to his friend and neighbor Alexander Spotswood: "Were it not then, that I am principled agt. [sic] selling Negroes, as you would Cattle in the market, I would not, in twelve months from this date, be possessed of one as a slave."

In 1795 and 1796, Washington devised a complicated plan that involved renting out his western lands to tenant farmers to whom he would lease his own slaves, and a similar scheme to lease the dower slaves he controlled to Dr. David Stuart for work on Stuart's Eastern Shore plantation. This plan would have involved breaking up slave families, but it was designed with an end goal of raising enough finances to fund their eventual emancipation (a detail Washington kept secret) and prevent the Custis heirs from permanently splitting up families by sale. (Note: The dower slaves had already begun to be transferred to Martha's granddaughters as the Custis heirs married. Young Martha brought sixty-one slaves to her marriage with Thomas Peter in 1795, Eliza married Thomas Law the next year and Nelly was wed to Lawrence Lewis in 1799. Peter had begun selling off slaves soon after his marriage, splitting up families and systematically separating girls as young as four years old from their parents. Wiencek suggests Martha's servant Oney Judge, who as a dower slave was destined to become Custis property, fled from Philadelphia in 1796 to avoid being sold.) The cost of emancipation included items that would later be described in his will.

None of these schemes could be realized because of his failure to sell or rent land at the right prices, the refusal of the Custis heirs to agree to them and his own reluctance to separate families. Wiencek speculates that, because Washington gave such serious consideration to freeing his slaves knowing full well the political ramifications that would follow, one of his goals was to make a public statement that would sway opinion towards abolition. Philip Morgan argues that Washington freeing his slaves while President in 1794 or 1796 would have had no profound effect, and would have been greeted with public silence and private derision by white southerners.

Wiencek writes that if Washington had found buyers for his land at what seemed like a fair price, this plan would have ultimately freed "both his own and the slaves controlled by Martha's family", and to accomplish this goal Washington would "yield up his most valuable remaining asset, his western lands, the wherewithal for his retirement." Ellis concludes that Washington prioritized his own financial security over the freedom of the enslaved population under his control, and writes, on Washington's failure to sell the land at prices he thought fair, "He had spent a lifetime acquiring an impressive estate, and he was extremely reluctant to give it up except on his terms." In discussing another of Washington's plans, drawn up after he had written his will, to transfer enslaved workers to his estates in western Virginia, Philip Morgan writes, "Indisputably, then, even on the eve of his death, Washington was far from giving up on slavery. To the last, he was committed to making profits, even at the expense of the disruptions such transfers would indisputably have wrought on his slaves."

As Washington subordinated his desire for emancipation to his efforts to secure financial independence, he took care to retain his slaves. From 1791, he arranged for those who served in his personal retinue in Philadelphia while he was President to be rotated out of the state before they became eligible for emancipation after six months residence per Pennsylvanian law. Not only would Washington have been deprived of their services if they were freed, most of the slaves he took with him to Philadelphia were dower slaves, which meant that he would have had to compensate the Custis estate for the loss. Because of his concerns for his public image and that the prospect of emancipation would generate discontent among the slaves before they became eligible for emancipation, he instructed that they be shuffled back to Mount Vernon "under pretext that may deceive both them and the Public".

Washington spared no expense in efforts to recover Hercules and Judge when they absconded. In Judge's case, Washington persisted for three years. He tried to persuade her to return when his agent eventually tracked her to New Hampshire, but refused to promise her freedom after his death; "However well disposed I might be to a gradual emancipation", he said, "or even to an entire emancipation of that description of People (if the latter was in itself practicable at this moment) it would neither be politic or just to reward unfaithfulness with a premature preference". Both Hercules and Judge eluded capture. Washington's search for a new chef to replace Hercules in 1797 is the last known instance in which he considered buying a slave, despite his resolve "never to become the Master of another Slave by purchase"; in the end he chose to hire a white chef.

=== Attitude to race ===
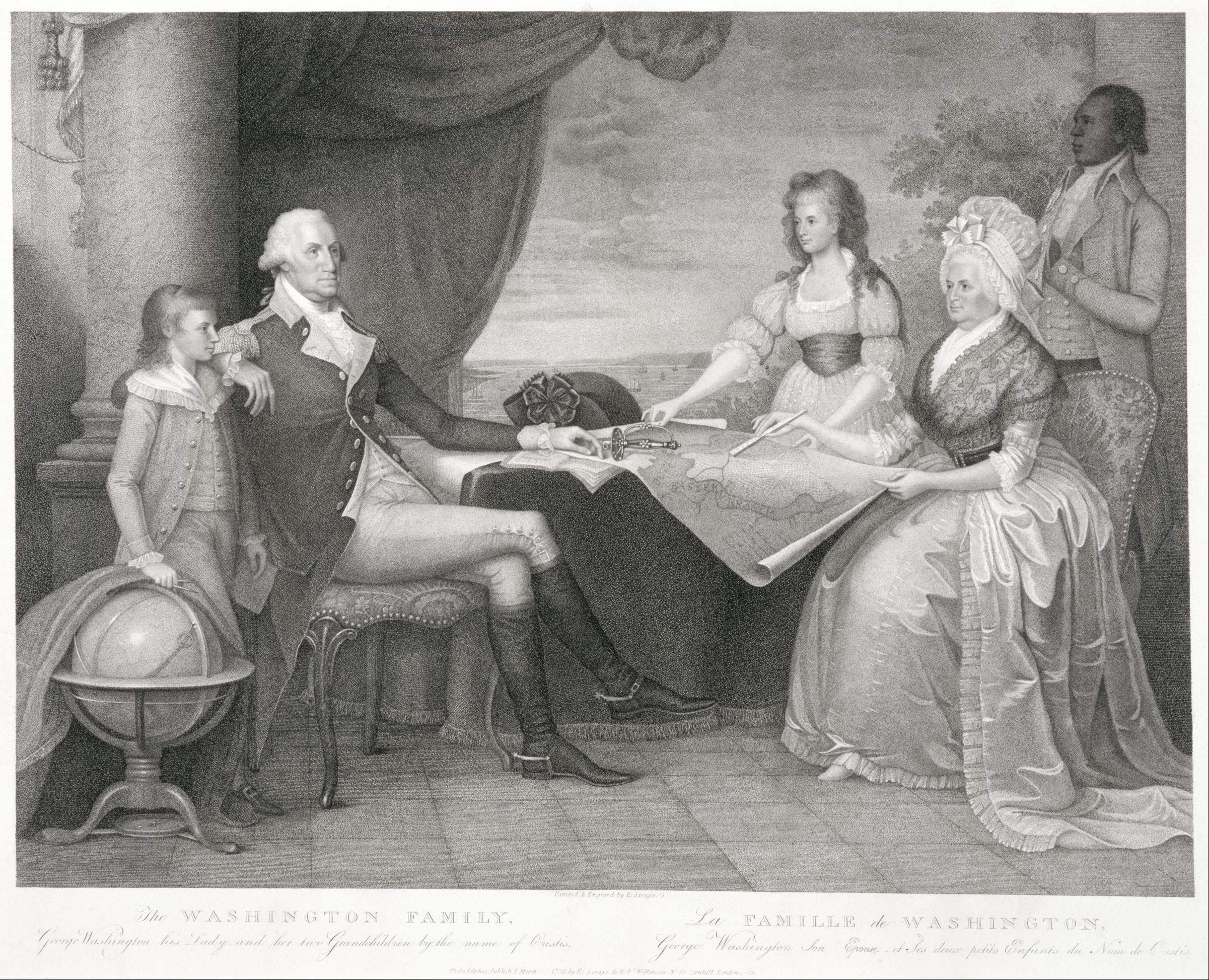
The Washington Family, printed and engraved by Edward Savage in the 1790s. George and Martha are seated, their children by her first marriage had already died, they were raising these grandchildren, Washy and Nelly, and the servant may be the enslaved Christopher Sheels.

Historian Joseph Ellis writes that Washington did not favor the continuation of legal slavery, and adds "[n]or did he ever embrace the racial arguments for black inferiority that Jefferson advanced....He saw slavery as the culprit, preventing the development of diligence and responsibility that would emerge gradually and naturally after emancipation." Other historians, such as Stuart Leibinger, agree with Ellis that, "Unlike Jefferson, Washington and Madison rejected innate black inferiority...."

The historian James Thomas Flexner says that "The record in relation to George Washington is a conspicuous demonstration of how black history has been neglected. One example: the two‐volume index to the thirty‐nine volume set of Washington's 'Writings' specifies almost everything except the names of slaves." In regard to Washington's racial views, Flexner says that the charge of racism has come from historical revisionism and lack of investigation, since slavery was "not invented for blacks, the institution was as old as history and had not, when Washington was a child, been officially challenged anywhere."

Kenneth Morgan writes that, "Washington's engrained sense of racial superiority to African Americans did not lead to expressions of negrophobia...Yet Washington wanted his white workers to be housed away from the blacks at Mt. Vernon, believing that close racial intermixture was undesirable." According to historian Albert Tillson, one reason why enslaved Black people were lodged separately at Mount Vernon is because Washington felt that some white workers had habits that were "not good" (e.g., Tillson mentions instances of "interracial drinking" in the Chesapeake area), and another reason is that, Tillson reports, Washington "expected such accommodations would eventually disgust the white family."

Philip Morgan writes that "The youthful Washington revealed prejudices toward blacks, quite natural for the day" and that "blackness, in his mind, was synonymous with uncivilized behaviour." Washington's prejudices were not hard and fast; his retention of African-Americans in the Virginia Regiment contrary to the rules, his employment of African-American overseers, his use of African-American doctors and his praise for the "great poetical Talents" of the African-American poet Phillis Wheatley, who had lauded him in a poem in 1775, show that he recognized the skills and talents of African-Americans. Historian Henry Wiencek rendered this judgment:

"If you look at Washington's will, he's not conflicted over the place of African Americans at all," Wiencek said in an interview. "From one end of his papers to the other, I looked for some sense of racism and found none, unlike Jefferson, who's explicit on his belief in the inferiority of Black people. In his will, Washington authored a bill of rights for Black people and said they should be taught to read and write. They were Americans, with the right to live here, to be educated, and to work productively as free people."

Martha Washington's views about slavery and race were different from her husband's, and were less favorable to African Americans. For example, she said in 1795 that, "The Blacks are so bad in their nature that they have not the least grat[i]tude for the kindness that may be shewed to them." She refused to follow the example he set by emancipating his slaves, and instead she bequeathed the only slave she directly owned (named Elish) to her grandson.

== Provisions of Will ==
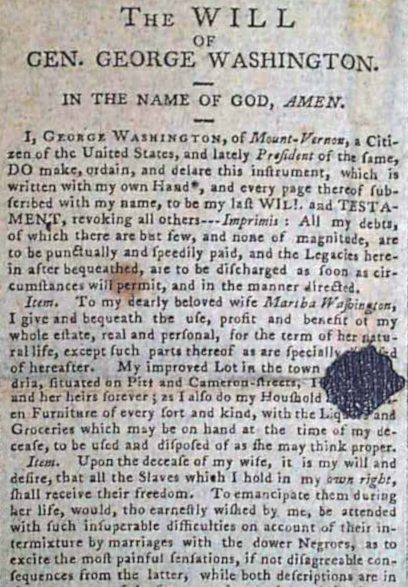
Washington's will published in the Connecticut Journal, February 20, 1800

In July 1799, five months before his death, Washington wrote his will, in which he stipulated that one of his slaves should be freed, and the remainder forced to work for his widow, to be freed on her death. In the months that followed, he considered a plan to repossess tenancies in Berkeley and Frederick Counties and transferring half of his Mount Vernon slaves to work them. It would, Washington hoped, "yield more nett profit" which might "benefit myself and not render the [slaves'] condition worse", despite the disruption such relocation would have had on the slave families. The plan died with Washington on December 14, 1799. (Note: Philip Morgan speculates that, had the plan proved profitable, Washington might have changed his will and retracted the manumission of his slaves.)

Washington's slaves were the subjects of the longest provisions in the 29-page will, taking three pages in which his instructions were more forceful than in the rest of the document. His valet, William Lee, was freed immediately and the use of his remaining 123 slaves was bequeathed to his widow until her death. The deferral was intended to postpone the pain of separation that would occur when his slaves were freed but their spouses among the dower slaves remained in bondage, a situation which affected 20 couples and their children. It is possible Washington hoped Martha and her heirs who would inherit the dower slaves would solve this problem by following his example and emancipating them. Those too old or infirm to work were to be supported by his estate, as mandated by state law. In the late 1790s, about half the enslaved population at Mount Vernon was too old, too young, or too infirm to be productive.

Washington went beyond the legal requirement to support and maintain younger slaves until adulthood, stipulating that those children whose education could not be undertaken by parents were to be taught reading, writing, and a useful trade by their masters and then be freed at the age of 25. He forbade the sale or transportation of any of his slaves out of Virginia before their emancipation. Including the Dandridge slaves, who were to be emancipated under similar terms, more than 160 slaves would be freed. Although Washington was not alone among Virginian slaveowners in providing for the delayed freedom of their slaves, he was unusual among those doing it for doing it so late, after the post-revolutionary support for emancipation in Virginia had faded. He was also unusual for being one of the few slaveowning founders to do so. Other founders who freed their slaves include John Dickinson and Caesar Rodney, both of Delaware.

== Aftermath ==
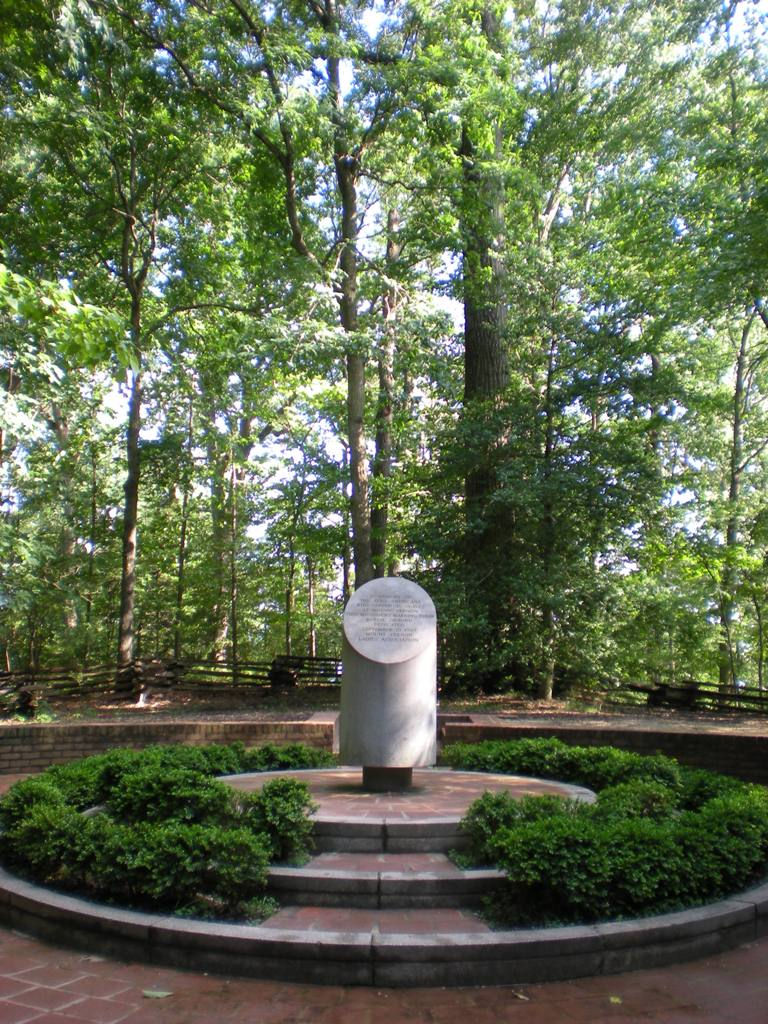
Slave burial ground memorial at Mount Vernon

Washington's action was ignored by southern slaveholders, and slavery continued at Mount Vernon. Already from 1795, dower slaves were being transferred to Martha's three granddaughters as the Custis heirs married. Martha felt threatened by being surrounded with slaves whose freedom depended on her death and freed her late husband's slaves on January 1, 1801. (Note: There is a suggestion that slaves were implicated in starting a fire at the main residence after Washington's death, and there were rumors that Martha was in danger, including one that slaves planned to poison her. Other factors that may have influenced her decision to free Washington's slaves early include concerns about the expense of maintaining slaves that were not necessary to operate the estate and about discontent among the dower slaves if they continued to mix with slaves who were to be freed.) That action by Martha Washington was not a violation of her husband's will, which did not require her to keep any slaves in bondage.

Able-bodied slaves were freed and left to support themselves and their families. Within a few months, almost all of Washington's former slaves had left Mount Vernon, leaving 121 adult and working-age children still working the estate. Five freedwomen were listed as remaining: an unmarried mother of two children; two women, one of them with three children, married to Washington slaves too old to work; and two women who were married to dower slaves. William Lee remained at Mount Vernon, where he worked as a shoemaker. After Martha's death on May 22, 1802, most of the remaining dower slaves passed to her grandson, George Washington Parke Custis, to whom she bequeathed the only slave she held in her own name.

There are few records of how the newly freed slaves fared. Custis later wrote that "although many of them, with a view to their liberation, had been instructed in mechanic trades, yet they succeeded very badly as freemen; so true is the axiom, 'that the hour which makes man a slave, takes half his worth away'". The son-in-law of Custis's sister wrote in 1853 that the descendants of those who remained slaves, many of them now in his possession, had been "prosperous, contented and happy", while those who had been freed had led a life of "vice, dissipation and idleness" and had, in their "sickness, age and poverty", become a burden to his in-laws. Such reports were influenced by the innate racism of the well-educated, upper-class authors and ignored the social and legal impediments that prejudiced the chances of prosperity for former slaves, which included laws that made it illegal to teach freedpeople to read and write and, in 1806, required newly freed slaves to leave the state.

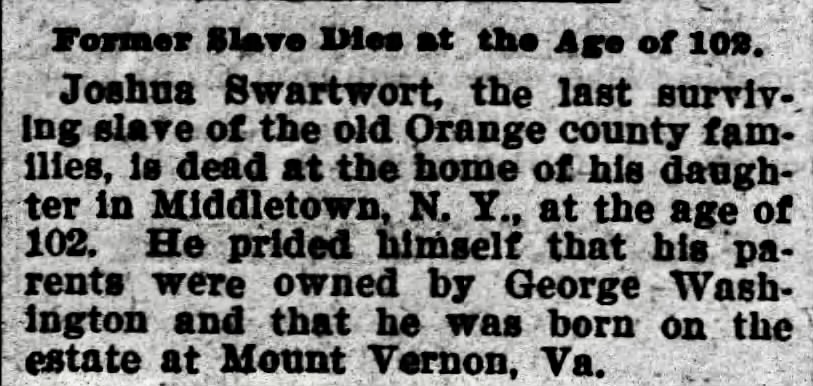
"Former slave dies at the age of 102" - Joshua Swartwort was born enslaved on Mount Vernon around 1800; his parents had been enslaved by George Washington (Public Press, Northumberland, Pa., November 21, 1902)

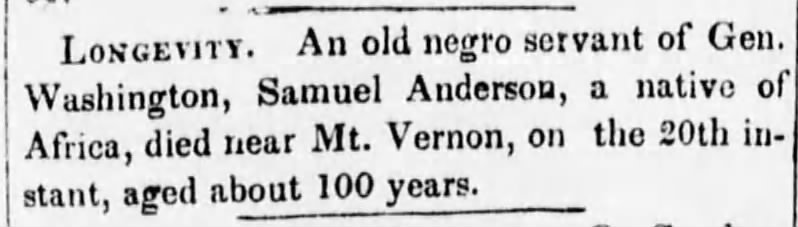
According to this brief obituary, Samuel Anderson had been born in Africa in the 1740s ("Longevity" Baltimore Daily Commercial, February 27, 1845)

There is evidence that some of Washington's former slaves were able to buy land, support their families and prosper as free people. By 1812, Free Town in Truro Parish, the earliest known free African-American settlement in Fairfax County, contained seven households of former Washington slaves. By the mid 1800s, a son of Washington's carpenter Davy Jones and two grandsons of his postilion Joe Richardson had each bought land in Virginia. Francis Lee, younger brother of William, was well known and respected enough to have his obituary printed in the Alexandria Gazette on his death at Mount Vernon in 1821. Sambo Anderson – who hunted game, as he had while Washington's slave, and prospered for a while by selling it to the most respectable families in Alexandria – was similarly noted by the Gazette when he died near Mount Vernon in 1845. Research published in 2019 has concluded that Hercules worked as a cook in New York, where he died on May 15, 1812.

A decade after Washington's death, the Pennsylvanian jurist Richard Peters wrote that Washington's servants "were devoted to him; and especially those more immediately about his person. The survivors of them still venerate and adore his memory." In his old age, Anderson said he was "a much happier man when he was a slave than he had ever been since", because he then "had a good kind master to look after all my wants, but now I have no one to care for me". When Judge was interviewed in the 1840s, she expressed considerable bitterness, not at the way she had been treated as a slave, but at the fact that she had been enslaved. When asked, having experienced the hardships of being a freewoman and having outlived both husband and children, whether she regretted her escape, she replied, "No, I am free, and have, I trust, been made a child of God by [that] means."

=== Political legacy ===
Washington's will was both private testament and public statement on the institution. It was published widely – in newspapers nationwide, as a pamphlet which, in 1800 alone, extended to thirteen separate editions, and included in other works – and became part of the nationalist narrative. In the eulogies of the antislavery faction, the inconvenient fact of Washington's slaveholding was downplayed in favor of his final act of emancipation. Washington "disdained to hold his fellow-creatures in abject domestic servitude," wrote the Massachusetts Federalist Timothy Bigelow before calling on "fellow-citizens in the South" to emulate Washington's example. In this narrative, Washington was a proto-abolitionist who, having added the freedom of his slaves to the freedom from British slavery he had won for the nation, would be mobilized to serve the antislavery cause.

An alternative narrative more in line with proslavery sentiments embraced rather than excised Washington's ownership of slaves. Washington was cast as a paternal figure, the benevolent father not only of his country but also of a family of slaves bound to him by affection rather than coercion. In this narrative, slaves idolized Washington and wept at his deathbed, and in an 1807 biography, Aaron Bancroft wrote, "In domestick [sic] and private life, he blended the authority of the master with the care and kindness of the guardian and friend." The competing narratives allowed both North and South to claim Washington as the father of their countries during the American Civil War that ended slavery more than half a century after his death.

There is tension between Washington's stance on slavery, and his broader historical role as a proponent of liberty. He was a slaveholder who led a war for liberty, and then led the establishment of a national government that secured liberty for many of its citizens, and historians have considered this a paradox. The historian Edmund Sears Morgan explained that Washington was not alone in this regard: "Virginia produced the most eloquent spokesmen for freedom and equality in the entire United States: George Washington, James Madison, and, above all, Thomas Jefferson. They were all slaveholders and remained so throughout their lives." Washington recognized this paradox, rejected the notion of black inferiority, and was somewhat more humane than other slaveowners, but failed to publicly become an active supporter of emancipation laws. Historians have found evidence of several reasons for that failure, including Washington's fears of disunion, the racism of many other Virginians, the problem of compensating owners, slaves' lack of education, and the unwillingness of Virginia's leaders to seriously consider such a step.

=== Memorial ===
In 1929, a plaque was embedded in the ground at Mount Vernon less than 50 yards (45 m) from the crypt housing the remains of Washington and Martha, marking a plot neglected by both groundsmen and tourist guides where slaves had been buried in unmarked graves. The inscription read, "In memory of the many faithful colored servants of the Washington family, buried at Mount Vernon from 1760 to 1860. Their unidentified graves surround this spot." The site remained untended and ignored in the visitor literature until the Mount Vernon Ladies' Association erected a more prominent monument surrounded with plantings and inscribed, "In memory of the Afro Americans who served as slaves at Mount Vernon this monument marking their burial ground dedicated September 21, 1983." In 1985, a ground-penetrating radar survey identified sixty-six possible burials. As of late 2017, an archaeological project begun in 2014 has identified, without disturbing the contents, sixty-three burial plots in addition to seven plots known before the project began.

== Bibliography ==
- Chernow, Ron (2010). Washington, A Life (e-book). London, United Kingdom: Allen Lane. ISBN 978-0-141-96610-6.
- Egerton, Douglas (2009). Death or Liberty: African Americans and Revolutionary America. New York City: Oxford University Press. ISBN 978-0195306699.
- Ellis, Joseph J. (2004). His Excellency: George Washington. New York, New York: Alfred A. Knopf. ISBN 978-1-4000-4031-5.
- Ferling, John E. (2002). Setting the World Ablaze: Washington, Adams, Jefferson, and the American Revolution. Oxford, United Kingdom: Oxford University Press. ISBN 978-0-19-513409-4.
- Ferling, John E. (2009). The Ascent of George Washington: The Hidden Political Genius of an American Icon. New York, New York: Bloomsbury Press. ISBN 978-1-6081-9182-6.
- Furstenberg, François (2006). In the Name of the Father: Washington's Legacy, Slavery, and the Making of a Nation. New York, New York: The Penguin Press. ISBN 978-1-59420-092-2.
- Haworth, Paul L. (1925). George Washington, Country Gentleman: Being an Account of His Home Life and Agricultural Activities. Indianapolis, Indiana: Bobbs-Merrill. OCLC 17471285.
- Henriques, Peter R. (2008). Realistic Visionary: A Portrait of George Washington. Charlottesville, Virginia: University of Virginia Press. ISBN 978-0-8139-2741-1.
- Hirschfeld, Fritz (1997). George Washington and Slavery: A Documentary Portrayal. Columbia, Missouri: University of Missouri Press. ISBN 978-0-8262-1135-4.
- Longmore, Paul K. (1988). The Invention of George Washington. Berkeley, California: University of California Press. ISBN 978-0-520-06272-6.
- Morgan, Philip (1987). "Three Planters and Their Slaves: Perspectives on Slavery in Virginia, South Carolina, and Jamaica, 1750–1790". In Jordan, Winthrop D.; Skemp, Sheila L. (eds.). Race and Family in the Colonial South. Jackson, Mississippi: University Press of Mississippi. pp. 37–80. ISBN 978-1-60473-395-2.
- Morgan, Philip D. & O'Shaughnessy, Andrew Jackson (2008). "Arming Slaves in the American Revolution". In Brown, Christopher Leslie & Morgan, Philip D. (eds.). Arming Slaves: From Classical Times to the Modern Age. New Haven, Connecticut: Yale University Press. pp. 180–208. ISBN 978-0-300-10900-9.
- Rhodehamel, John (2017). George Washington: The Wonder of the Age. New Haven, Connecticut: Yale University Press. ISBN 978-0-300-21997-5.
- Schwartz, Marie Jenkins (2017). Ties That Bound: Founding First Ladies and Slaves. Chicago, Illinois: University of Chicago Press. ISBN 978-0-226-14755-0.
- Stathis, Stephen W. (2014). Landmark Legislation 1774–2012: Major U.S. Acts and Treaties. Washington D.C.: CQ Press. ISBN 978-1-4522-9229-8.
- Thompson, Mary V. (2019). The Only Unavoidable Subject of Regret: George Washington, Slavery, and the Enslaved Community at Mount Vernon. Charlottesville, Virginia: University of Virginia Press. ISBN 978-0-8139-4184-4.
- Twohig, Dorothy (2001). " 'That Species of Property': Washington's Role in the Controversy over Slavery". In Higginbotham, Don (ed.). George Washington Reconsidered. Charlottesville, Virginia: University of Virginia Press. pp. 114–138. ISBN 978-0-8139-2005-4.
- Wiencek, Henry (2003). An Imperfect God: George Washington, His Slaves, and the Creation of America. New York, New York: Farrar, Straus and Giroux. ISBN 978-0-374-17526-9.
- Wood, Gordon S. (1992). The Radicalism of the American Revolution. New York, New York: Alfred A. Knopf. ISBN 978-0-679-40493-4.

=== Journals ===
- Boller, Paul F. (1961). "Washington, The Quakers, and Slavery". The Journal of Negro History. 46 (2). University of Chicago Press: 83–88. doi:10.2307/2716714. JSTOR 2716714. S2CID 149985001.
- Furstenberg, François (2011). "Atlantic Slavery, Atlantic Freedom: George Washington, Slavery, and Transatlantic Abolitionist Networks". The William and Mary Quarterly. 68 (2). Omohundro Institute of Early American History and Culture: 247–286. doi:10.5309/willmaryquar.68.2.0247. JSTOR 10.5309/willmaryquar.68.2.0247.
- Morgan, Kenneth (2000). "George Washington and the Problem of Slavery". Journal of American Studies. 34 (2). Cambridge University Press: 279–301. doi:10.1017/S0021875899006398. JSTOR 27556810. S2CID 145717616.
- Morgan, Philip D. (2005). " 'To Get Quit of Negroes': George Washington and Slavery". Journal of American Studies. 39 (3). Cambridge University Press: 403–429. doi:10.1017/S0021875805000599. JSTOR 27557691. S2CID 145143979.
- Vail, R.W.G., ed. (1947). "A Dinner at Mount Vernon: From the Unpublished Journal of Joshua Brooks (1773–1859)". New-York Historical Society Quarterly. 31 (2). The New-York Historical Society: 72–85.

=== Websites ===
- Ganeshram, Ramin (2019). "Art Fraud, A 218-year old Cold Case, and the History Detectives From WHS". Westport Historical Society.
- MacLeod, Jessie (2018). "How Did George Washington Treat His Slaves?". Official YouTube channel of George Washington's Mount Vernon. Mount Vernon Ladies' Association. Archived from the original on December 17, 2021.
- "MVLA Forgotten No Longer". George Washington's Mount Vernon. Mount Vernon Ladies' Association.
- "MVLA Resistance & Punishment". George Washington's Mount Vernon. Mount Vernon Ladies' Association.
- "MVLA Slave Burial Ground Archaeology". George Washington's Mount Vernon. Mount Vernon Ladies' Association.
