= Debbie Reese =

Nambé Pueblo scholar and educator

Dr. Debbie Reese
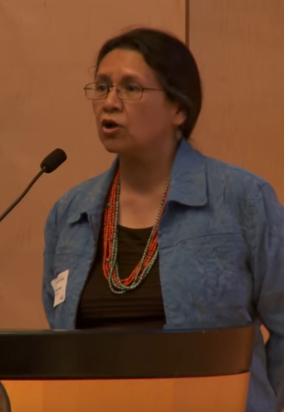
- Reese at 2016 Association of Children's Librarians Institute
- Born: Debbie Yates; Santa Fe, New Mexico
- Citizenship: Nambé Pueblo, United States of America
- Occupations: Scholar, educator, activist
- Known for: Advocacy for Children's Literature Reform, American Indians in Children's Literature Blog
- Notable work: An Indigenous Peoples' History of the United States for Young People (2019)
- Website: https://americanindiansinchildrensliterature.blogspot.com/

Debbie Reese is a Nambé Pueblo scholar, advocate, and educator. Reese founded American Indians in Children's Literature, which analyzes representations of Native and Indigenous peoples in children's literature. She co-edited a young adult adaptation of An Indigenous Peoples' History of the United States with Jean Mendoza in 2019.

== Early life and education ==
Reese was born and raised on the Nambé Pueblo reservation in New Mexico. She is also tribally enrolled at Nambe.

She attended the University of New Mexico, where she received a B.A. in education. She received a PhD in education from University of Illinois at Urbana-Champaign. She later received her MLIS from San Jose State University through a grant that funded 20 Native students to complete the degree.

== Career ==
Prior to obtaining her PhD, she was a school teacher and taught at two American elementary schools, and at two schools for Native Americans: Riverside Indian School in Anadarko, Oklahoma, and Santa Fe Indian School in Santa Fe, New Mexico. She previously taught in American Indian Studies at University of Illinois.

In 2006, Reese founded American Indians in Children's Literature (AICL), an organization and website that offers critical analysis of Native and Indigenous peoples in children's literature. She frequently discusses the inaccuracy of depictions of Natives in classic American children's literature like Peter Pan and Little House on the Prairie series, and suggests that they promote harmful stereotypes about Native people or lead readers to believe that Native people no longer exist. She was one of the key voices responsible for the successful campaign to rename the American Library Association's highest award for authors of children's books from the Laura Ingalls Wilder Medal into the Children's Literature Legacy Award.

Her scholarship and advocacy has been instrumental in the transformation of representation of Native Americans in children's literature. Reese's work has promoted Native authors, particularly those who tell stories from their own lives and communities. Reese advocates for teachers and parents to select books written for and by Native Americans as the best way to engage their narratives. She has repeatedly spoken against the previously commonplace publication of Native stories by non-Native writers from the "big five" publishers. Reese was one of several writers who spoke out against the publication of children's book A Birthday Cake for George Washington and used AICL to track the publisher's response to the campaign.

In 2019, she and Jean Mendoza co-wrote An Indigenous Peoples' History of the United States for Young People, based on An Indigenous Peoples' History of the United States. The book was named a 2020 American Indian Youth Literature Young Adult Honor Book.

She is an outspoken opponent of the Trump-era book-bans that target stories featuring diverse identities or that depict the violence of American colonialism.

== Personal life ==
Reese lives in California. She is married and has one daughter.

== Works ==
- Mendoza, Jean; Reese, Debbie (2019). An Indigenous Peoples' History of the United States for Young People. Penguin Random House. ISBN 9780807049396.

== Accolades ==
- 2018 - May Hill Arbuthnot Honor Lecture Award, American Library Association
- 2022 - University of New Mexico Native American Alumni Chapter's Outstanding Alumni Award.

For An Indigenous Peoples' History of the United States for Young People:

- Best YA Nonfiction of 2019, Kirkus Reviews
- Best Nonfiction of 2019, School Library Journal
- 2020 American Indian Youth Literature Award for Young Adult Honor Book
- 2020 In the Margins Award
