= Hope Park =

Historic house in Virginia, United States

Hope Park and Hope Park Mill
- Hope Park Plantation
- Interactive map of the Hope Park and Hope Park Mill area

General information
- Type: Private residence/business
- Location: Fairfax County, Virginia, Fairfax, U.S.

Hope Park was an 18th and 19th-century plantation in Fairfax County, Virginia, where Dr. David Stuart (1753–1814), an old friend of and correspondent with George Washington lived with his wife, (Washington's former stepdaughter-in-law) Eleanor Calvert Custis (1758–1811), and family. It was approximately 5 miles (8.0 km) southwest of Fairfax Court House (now known as the independent city of Fairfax).

== History ==
=== Payne family ===
The Hope Park plantation was founded in the 1750s by Edward Payne, a justice of the Fairfax County Court from 1764 to 1785 and builder of Payne's Church (completed in 1778). Payne served with George Washington and George Mason on the Truro Parish vestry, and Washington occasionally visited the Paynes at Hope Park. Payne constructed a small grist mill, probably on Piney Branch which ran through the Hope Park property. A mill would have been an important adjunct to the plantation.

=== Stuart family ===
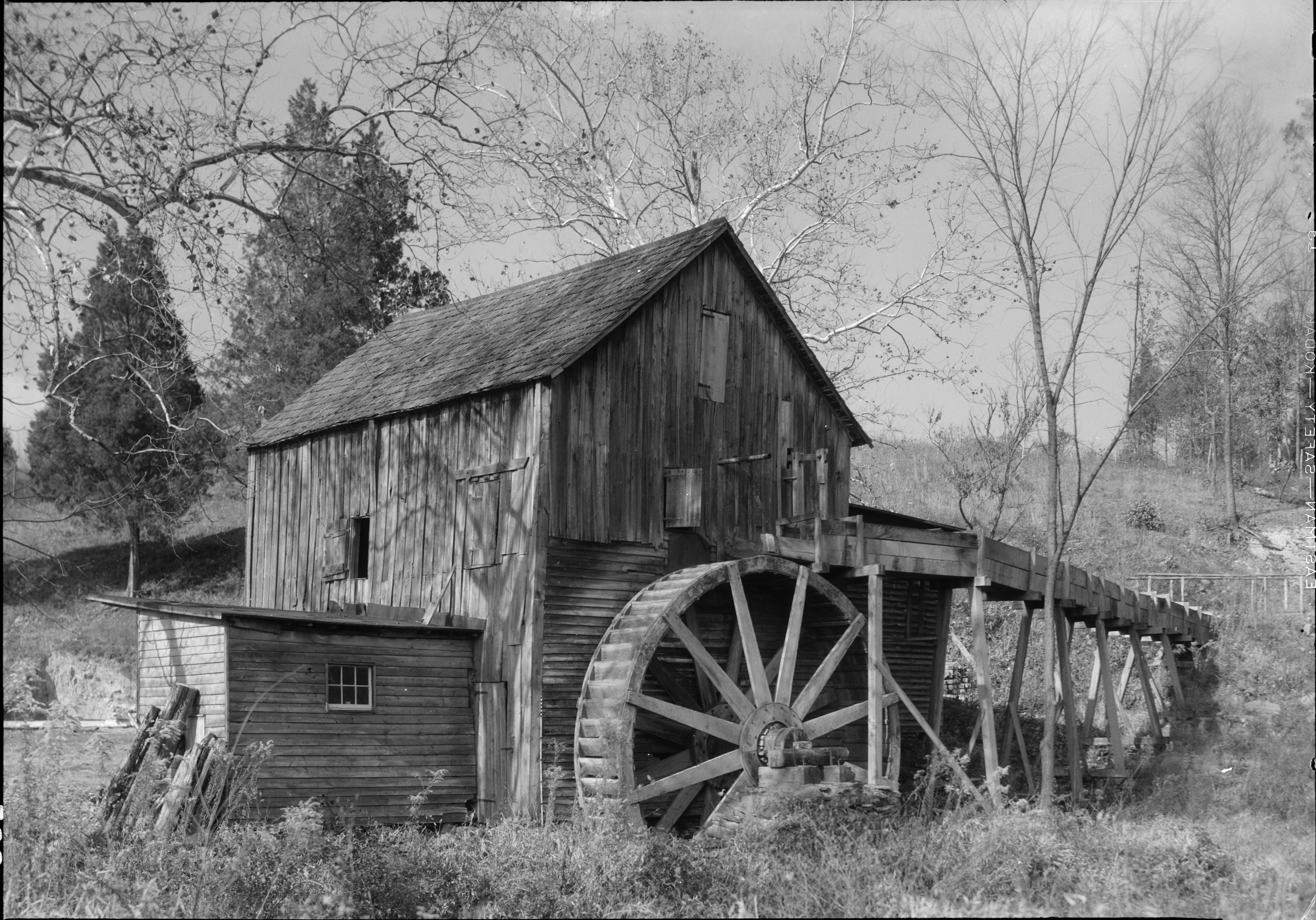
20th century photo of the mill

In 1783, Stuart married Eleanor Calvert Custis, the young widow of John Parke Custis and thus daughter-in-law of Martha Washington and stepdaughter-in-law of George Washington. Until relocating to Hope Park sometime between 1791 and 1793, the couple resided at Custis's Abingdon plantation overlooking the Potomac River. Estates along major waterways found transport and communication easier than those in the interior of Fairfax County such as Hope Park, so the Stuarts initially lived at Custis' Abington plantation on the Potomac River on the grounds of Ronald Reagan Washington National Airport, before moving to Hope Park. The Stuarts regularly received George and Martha Washington as guests at Abingdon as well as at Hope Park plantation, and were frequent guests at Mount Vernon. Because of the close relationship between the Stuart and Washington families, Hope Park is mentioned frequently in Washington's correspondences and diaries.

Dr. David Stuart purchased Hope Park plantation in 1785, two years after marrying General Washington's widowed daughter-in-law described below. Stuart was an Alexandria physician and planter who served several terms (part-time) as one of Fairfax County's representatives in the Virginia House of Delegates. On January 22, 1791, then President Washington appointed Dr. Stuart as the member representing Virginia on the first board of Commissioners of the Federal City, and he served for almost four years.

By 1789, Stuart was one of the gentleman justices for the Fairfax County Court, normally a lifetime appointment. The Virginia General Assembly named Stuart a trustee by for the towns of Centreville in 1792 and Providence, later known as Fairfax Court House, and then Fairfax, in 1805, and he also served as a trustee of a school in Centreville.

While two Custis siblings, Eleanor Parke Custis and George Washington Parke Custis, lived at Mount Vernon, Philadelphia, and New York City, with George and Martha Washington, they also visited their mother at Hope Park. Dr. Stuart handled the financial accounts of his stepchildren, and also raised his stepdaughters (President George Washington's step-granddaughters) Martha Parke Custis and Elizabeth Parke Custis, who both married at Hope Park. Martha Custis married Thomas Peter on January 6, 1795, and Elizabeth Custis married Thomas Law on March 20, 1796. These elder Custis daughters moved to Hope Park and lived there with their mother, stepfather and many half-siblings. Peters was the son of a successful Georgetown merchant, and Law was the son of Edmund Law, Bishop of Carlisle, and the younger brother of Edward Law, 1st Baron Ellenborough, George Henry Law, later Bishop of Bath and Wells, and John Law, a Church of Ireland bishop. The Custis/Law union was a short one and ended in divorce in 1806.

Most likely under Stuart's ownership and before the Stuart family relocated to Ossian Hall in 1804, a second mill and was constructed on the west bank of Piney Branch, as well as an adjacent miller's house. Their precise dates of construction remain unknown, but in a sale notice in 1815 (a year after Dr. Stuart's death) it was advertised as being "in complete repair". Preservationist Russell Wright studied the mill in 1972 and believed it built circa 1800. Then known as "Hope Park Mill," it became a neighborhood mill, serving several nearby plantations in central Fairfax County.

=== Barnes family and the American Civil War ===
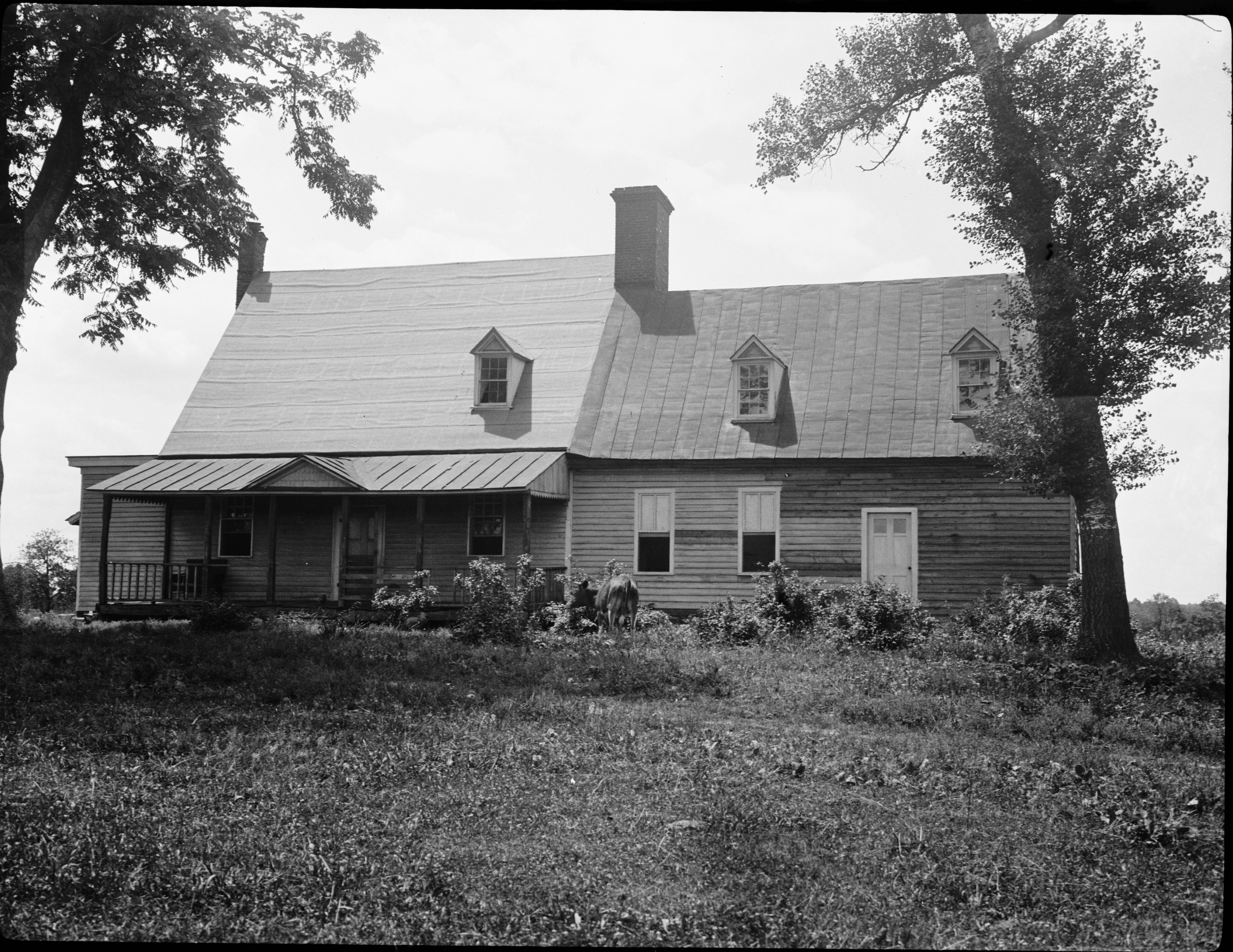
Hope Park Mansion c. 1937

The bulk of the Hope Park plantation property remained in Dr. Stuart's estate until December 1837 when John H. Barnes, Sr. purchased a 1,000-acre tract which included the mill and miller's house, but not the main Hope Park dwelling. Barnes purchased the main house and rest of the Hope Park plantation in February 1838. Barnes Sr.'s family became the first known occupants of the miller's house, and later moved into the main house.

After Barnes Sr. died, Hope Park plantation was broken into eight inheritance properties. His widow, Sarah Barnes, received the main Hope Park dwelling house with 194 acres which was referred to as the "Mansion House Tract." When the estate was settled in 1853, Barnes' eldest son Jack Barnes (i.e., John H. Barnes, Jr.) who had been trained as a miller and his wife, Mary Fox Barnes, received the mill and miller's house, which they occupied and called "Huntley." The remaining six children received other Hope Park plantation parcels.

While Hope Park plantation prospered under the Barnes family, so its slave population grew. In the 1840s, the Barnes family owned four slaves, seven in 1850, and 12 in 1860. The number of slaves owned by the Barnes family was relatively low in comparison to the slave workforces at neighboring Fairfax County plantations, perhaps because Barnes' sons also worked on the plantation.

In June 1861, following Virginia's Secession Convention and affirmatory vote, John Barnes's three sons, including Jack (then 29 years old), traveled to Fairfax Court House and enlisted in the 17th Virginia Volunteer Infantry Regiment, known as the "Fairfax Rifles." Two months later, Jack Barnes was captured and sent to the Old Capitol Prison in Washington, D.C. (the first of his three Federal incarcerations).

Barnes' widow Sarah, her four daughters, Jack Barnes' wife Mary, and their children and slaves evacuated both Hope Park and Huntley early in the conflict. They returned following the Confederate victory at the First Battle of Bull Run, finding both the Hope Park and Huntley residences still standing, but obviously vandalized, presumably by Union soldiers.

During the winter of 1861/1862, Confederate troops used Hope Park Mill as Post No. 3. Confederate forces vacated the Hope Park Mill in March 1862, as Union Army troops advanced into western Fairfax County to conduct foraging and resupply operations against civilians. Union soldiers confiscated everything they could carry, including vegetables and pigs. One of the confiscated pigs belonged to ten-year-old Nettie (Jack and Mary Barnes' daughter), who according to the Barnes family story, objected vociferously. Charles V. Mauro's The Civil War in Fairfax County: Civilians and Soldiers described its recovery:

Nettie carried on so that mama finally told one of the slaves to take her over to the camp and see if the Union soldiers wouldn't give the pet pig back. The two were met by sentries, who took Nettie and the servant before the commander. Nettie, between sobs, told about the theft of her pig and pleaded for its return.

The Yankee officer asked Nettie if she could point out the soldier who had taken her pig. She said she could. So the officer lined up the raiding company up in front of Nettie and she quickly picked out the guilty one. The officer didn't order the man shot, but he did order him to return the pig post-haste. The soldier saluted, got the pig and carried it back to our home, with Nettie and the servant trudging along beside him.

=== Robey family ===
The mill at Hope Park prospered again around the turn of the 20th century under the ownership of Frank Robey. Hope Park Mill's commercial production ended when Robey died in 1916 brought an end to .

=== Current status ===
- Hope Park Mill and Miller's House
- U.S. National Register of Historic Places
- Virginia Landmarks Register
- Fairfax County Historic Overlay District
- Fairfax County Inventory of Historic Sites
- Location within Virginia
- Location: 12124 Pope's Head Road; Fairfax, Virginia
- Coordinates: 38°48′51″N 77°22′0″W
- Area: 30.1 acres (12.2 ha)
- Built: c. 1800
- NRHP reference No.: 77001486
- VLR No.: 029-0064

Significant dates
- Added to NRHP: August 15, 1977
- Designated VLR: November 16, 1976
- Designated HOD: 1980; revised December 2017
- Designated FCIHS: September 12, 1972

Hope Park Mill and Miller's House (sometimes known collectively as "Robey's Mill" or "Piney Branch Mill"), along with a log smokehouse, spring house, and cabin, are preserved. Hope Park's mill and adjacent ancillary buildings were listed as "Hope Park Mill and Miller's House" on the Virginia Landmarks Register on November 16, 1976, and on the National Register of Historic Places on August 15, 1977. Hope Park Mill and Miller's House are located at 12124 Pope's Head Road, Fairfax, Virginia. At the time of the complex's listings in 1976 and 1977, the property was owned by Sally and David McGrath who also lived in the Miller's House. In 1980, Fairfax County created the Robey's Mill Historic Overlay District (HOD).

The Hope Park mansion house and the mill were photographed by the Historic American Buildings Survey (HABS) in the 1930s. Detailed measured drawings of the mansion house were made in the 1930s, and of the mill in the 1970s; all can be viewed on the Library of Congress website. A plaque from the U.S. Department of the Interior commemorating this activity sits in the mansion house.

As of the time of this article's composition and subsequent to the Barnes' tenure, ownership of the Hope Park mansion house (and its fluctuating acreages due to sales or inheritances) has been held by, the Newmans, Zimmerman, the Mattinglys, the Flints, and the Warhursts. The Hope Park mansion house, as it has evolved over the years, remains in use as a private residence and shares a seven-acre lot with a grand modern home about a mile from the mill and miller's house. Until 1976 when the remaining 82-acre Hope Park "Mansion House Tract" was subdivided, the address of the mansion house was 11807 Pope's Head Road. Lloyd and Jo Ellen Flint named the old farm lane from Popes Head Road to the mansion house Quiet Brook Road. Quiet Brook Road was extended beyond the mansion house and a new branch in the road was created and named Bob's Ford Road to provide access to lots at the back of the tract. At that time, the mansion house address became 5709 Quiet Brook Road.
