= David Stuart (Virginia politician) =

American politician (1753–1814)

Member of the Virginia House of Delegates from Fairfax County
- In office October 17, 1785 – October 18, 1789
- Preceded by: Alexander Henderson
- Succeeded by: Ludwell Lee

1st Commissioner of the Federal City
- In office January 22, 1791 – September 12, 1794
- Preceded by: Office created
- Succeeded by: William Thornton

Personal details
- Born: August 3, 1753 King George County, Virginia, British America
- Died: October 1814 (aged 61) Alexandria, Fairfax County, Virginia, U.S.
- Party: Federalist
- Spouse: Eleanor Calvert Custis
- Education: College of William and Mary; University of Edinburgh

David Stuart (August 3, 1753 – October 1814) was an American physician and politician from Virginia who was a correspondent of George Washington. He was a member of the Virginia House of Delegates from 1785 to 1789. When Washington became President of the United States, he made Stuart one of three commissioners of the Federal City appointed to design a new United States capital city.

== Early life and education ==
Stuart was the eldest of five sons of Rev. William Stuart (1723-1798) and Sarah Foote (1732-about 1795). Rev. Stuart and his wife received the "Cedar Grove" plantation on the Potomac River as a wedding present. Rev. William Stuart was the rector of St. Paul's Parish, King George County, Virginia from 1749-1796. Rev. Stuart studied theology in London and was ordained there by Bishop Edmund Gibson. Rev. William Stuart was known for his eloquence, integrity, and virtue. Rev. Stuart's family also included seven daughters.

Rev. William Stuart's father was Rev. David Stuart. Rev. David Stuart is said to have descended from the royal house of Scotland, and after unsuccessfully supporting the "pretender" James Francis Stuart, became a minister and emigrated to Virginia in 1715. Rev. David Stuart married Jane Gibbons. Jane Gibbons brother was Sir William Gibbons, 1st Baronet Gibbons, Speaker for the House of Assembly in Barbados. Rev. David Stuart served as rector of the same parish (then in Stafford County, Virginia and now known as Aquia Church) from 1722 until his death in 1749.

Stuart received a private education suitable to his class, then graduated from the College of William and Mary in Williamsburg before sailing to Europe to complete his education. He studied medicine at the University of Edinburgh before finishing his medical studies in Paris, France. He returned to the United States in 1778. In 1802, his brother Richard married the widow Margaret Robinson McCarty, whose husband held public office and owned operations plantations in Fairfax County, and his sister Ann in 1793 married William Mason, son of George Mason, whom Stuart in effect had replaced in the Virginia Ratification Convention described below.

== Career and public life ==
Upon returning to Virginia, Stuart established a medical practice in Alexandria. He lived and farmed mostly outside of Alexandria in Fairfax County, Virginia. His first farm was at the Abingdon plantation, which was within the area that Virginia ceded to the federal government in 1791 to help create the future District of Columbia in accordance with an amendment to the federal Residence Act. Partially located on the grounds of Ronald Reagan Washington National Airport, the Abingdon plantation's site is now within Arlington County, Virginia.

Stuart and James Wright purchased a lot in the town of Alexandria in 1783, during the same year Stuart married Eleanor Calvert Custis, the widow of John Parke Custis, George Washington's stepson.

Stuart used slaves when farming. Several letters between the former president and Stuart, some of whose farming activities benefitted his stepchildren, as the residual beneficiaries of the dower slaves, discussed the gradual abolition of slavery, as well as white landowners who harassed free Black landowners, knowing that Virginia's law against allowing Blacks to testify meant that illegal actions could have no negative consequences. In the 1787 tax census Stuart owned 13 adult and nine child slaves in Fairfax County, while his father owned 16 adult and 16 child slaves in King George County. His minister father retired in 1796 and died in 1798. His stepson George Washington Parke Custis later criticized the former president's testamentary manumission of his slaves, helped the widower Stuart advertise the sale of slaves in Alexandria in 1812, and at his own death freed many slaves.

Fairfax County voters elected and thrice re-elected Stuart as one of their representatives to the Virginia House of Delegates, and he served in that part-time position from 1785 until 1789.

Voters in the Prince William District chose Stuart as an elector for the 1788-1789 Presidential election. That District consisted of the counties of Fairfax, Fauquier, Loudoun and Prince William, which cover the area south and west of present day Washington D.C. Each of the ten Virginia electors cast one of their two votes for George Washington. There is no record of how the individuals of the Virginia delegation voted for Vice-President, but five of those electors cast their other vote for John Adams; three cast theirs for George Clinton; one cast his for John Hancock; and one cast his for John Jay.

Stuart ended his state legislative career by representing Fairfax County in the Virginia convention of 1788 that considered the ratification of the United States Constitution. Stuart served alongside Alexandria lawyer Charles Simms, also a staunch Federalist and multi-term Fairfax County representative in the House of Delegates; George Mason had often represented Fairfax County in the House of Delegates and also served in the Constitutional Convention in Philadelphia, where the U.S. Constitution was drafted. He vocally opposed ratification, leading Fairfax County voters to refuse to elect him to the Ratification Convention. Thus Mason instead represented Stafford County at the convention, where he and Patrick Henry led the anti-Ratification forces. Westmoreland County southeast of Fairfax County also elected federalist or ratification advocates: Henry Lee III (Light-Horse Harry Lee) and General Washington's nephew (and eventual heir), Bushrod Washington.

In the near final vote after extensive debate, the convention considered the following resolution:

Resolved, That previous to the ratification of the new Constitution of government recommended by the late Federal Convention, a declaration of rights asserting and securing from encroachment the great principle of civil and religious liberty and the unalienable rights of the people, together with amendments to the most exceptional parts of the said Constitution, ought to be referred by this Convention to the other States in the American Confederation for their consideration.

Federalist or ratification forces led by James Madison, John Marshall and Edmund Randolph, defeated the Mason/Henry resolution, 88—80. Stuart, Simms, Lee, Washington, Madison, Marshall, Randolph and others then voted in favor of a resolution to ratify the constitution, which the convention approved on June 28, 1789 by a vote of 89-79, with Mason and Henry voting in the minority.

In 1791, President George Washington appointed Stuart to serve as a commissioner of the new Federal City to oversee the surveying of the new capital and construction of the public buildings. He served on the commission until 1794. In their first year, Stuart and the other commissioners named the capital the "City of Washington" in "The Territory of Columbia". On April 15, 1791, he and anothor commissioner, Daniel Carroll, attended a ceremony at which the first boundary stone (the south cornerstone) for the Territory of Columbia (the future District of Columbia) was placed at Jones Point, the tip of a cape immediately north of the confluence of Hunting Creek and the Potomac River.

Stuart was also a founding trustee of the towns of Centreville and Providence (now Fairfax City), and of the Centreville Academy in 1808.

== Family ==
On November 20, 1783, Stuart married Eleanor Calvert Custis, the widow of John Parke Custis. She was a descendant of Cecilius Calvert, Lord Baltimore, who had received the charter for the Maryland colony. A number of letters from Washington to Stuart about family matters and Virginia politics have been preserved. Contrary to modern myth, David and Eleanor were not cousins, as no connection between their families has been identified. Rev. David Stuart's ancestry is unknown; and the mother of Benedict Swingate Calvert, Eleanor's grandfather, is also unknown.

The first husband of Eleanor Calvert Custis of Maryland was John Parke Custis of Virginia. He was the son of Daniel Parke Custis and Martha Dandridge Custis. He became then-General George Washington's stepson when his mother Martha Dandridge Custis married the general. John Parke Custis died of disease in 1781 after the Battle of Yorktown. His survivors included his wife Eleanor Calvert Custis and four children. They lived at the Custis family's Abingdon at the time.

Stuart was the step-father and legal guardian of John and Eleanor's children, including George Washington Parke Custis and Eleanor (Nelly) Custis, even while they lived with their grandmother Martha Dandridge Custis Washington and her husband, George Washington at Mount Vernon, Virginia.

In 1791, Stuart and his family moved from Abingdon to Hope Park, further west in Fairfax County. In 1804, the family moved to Ossian Hall near Annandale, also in Fairfax County. The Virginia General Assembly also named Stuart as one of Fairfax County's gentleman justices, normally a lifetime appointment. Stuart had a crucial role in relocating the courthouse from Alexandria further inland to Fairfax County in December 1789.

As Eleanor's husband, Stuart became the administrator of the estate of John Parke Custis, and in 1806, secured a judgment against the administrators of the estate of George Washington for 2,100 L Virginia currency. Stuart managed the property that Custis wanted his children to inherit when they came of age, and also helped raise the children of John and Eleanor Custis. Daughters Elizabeth Parke Custis Law and Martha Parke Custis Peter lived with the Stuarts, while Eleanor Parke Custis and George Washington Parke Custis spent considerable time with George and Martha Washington, both at Mount Vernon and his governmental residence in Philadelphia.

During their lifetimes, David and Eleanor Stuart, with their children, lived at three different plantations in Fairfax County: Abingdon, until 1791; Hope Park, until 1804; and Ossian Hall. Stuart employed Dublin-born Thomas Tracy to tutor the children, and also allowed him to conduct classes for slave children in a different building.

Eleanor and David had 16 children, including:

- Ann Calvert Stuart (1784–1823), married William Robinson
- Sarah Stuart (1786–1870), married Obed Waite
- Ariana Calvert Stuart (1789–1855)
- William Sholto Stuart (1792–1820)
- Charles Calvert Stuart (1794–1846), married Cornelia Lee Turberville
- Eleanor Custis Stuart (1796–1875)
- Rosalie Eugenia Stuart (1801–1886), married William Greenleaf Webster

== Death and legacy ==
Stuart's exact date of death is unknown, but he wrote a codicil to his will on October 7, 1814, and his will was filed on Oct 17, 1814, so it was between those dates. His daughter stated he died at "Howard," the residence of his son-in-law Mr. Robinson” (Anne Calvert Stuart’s husband), in Alexandria. It's also unclear where he was buried, but it is likely he was buried at the cemetery on his property at Ossian Hall. Eleanor Calvert Custis Stuart died at her daughter's house in Georgetown, District of Columbia, in 1811, and was originally buried at "Effingham" plantation in Prince William County. Her body was later moved to Page's Chapel in 1848, part of St. Thomas Church in Croom, Prince George's County, Maryland.
