= Tudor Place =

Historic house in Washington, D.C., United States

- U.S. National Register of Historic Places
- U.S. National Historic Landmark
- D.C. Inventory of Historic Sites
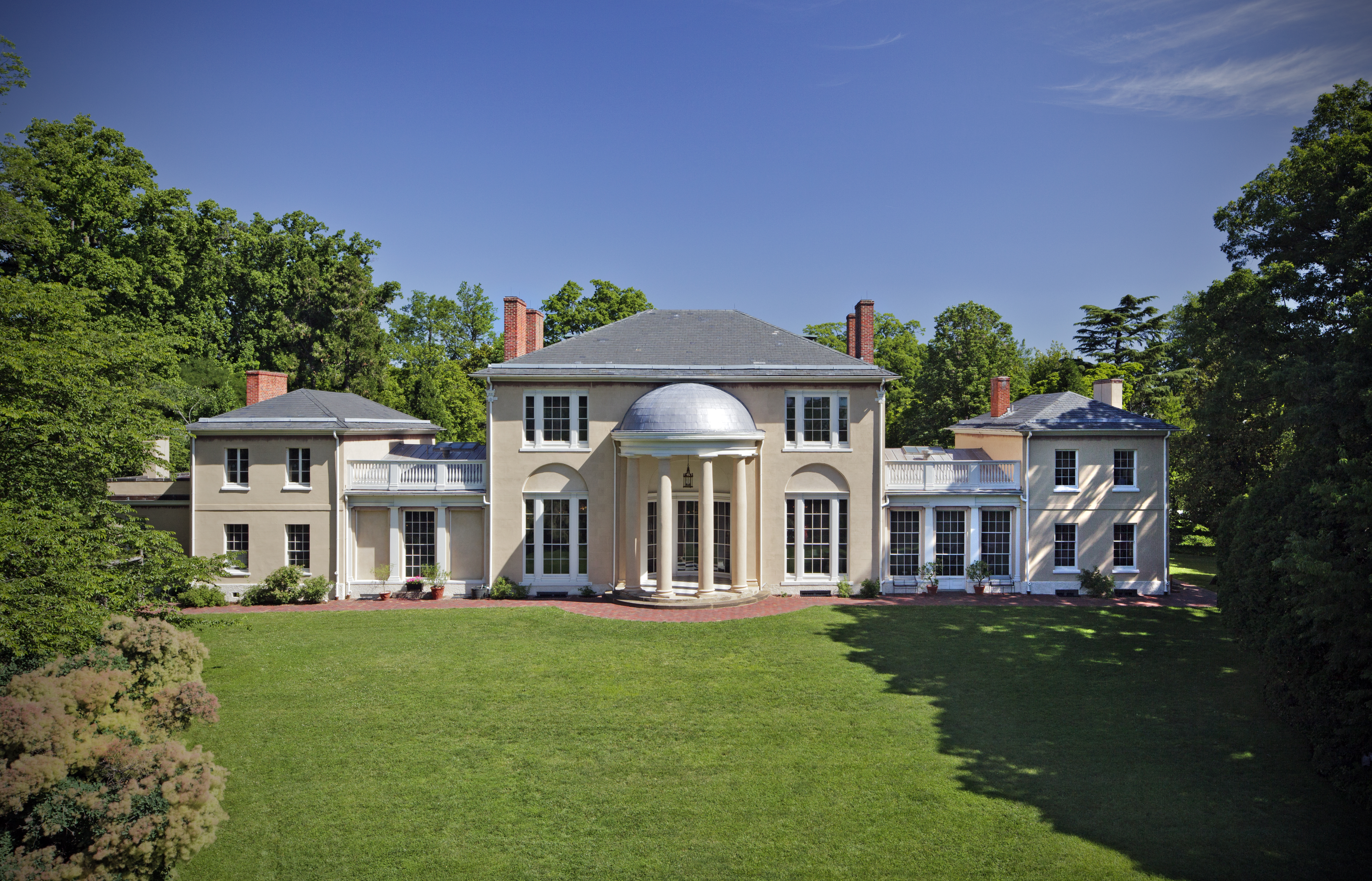
- South façade.

- Location within Washington, D.C.
- Location: 1644 31st Street, NW Washington, D.C.
- Coordinates: 38°54′38.91″N 77°3′48.02″W
- Area: 5.5 acres (2.2 ha)
- Built: 1815
- Architect: Dr. William Thornton
- Architectural style: Federal
- NRHP reference No.: 66000871

Significant dates
- Added to NRHP: October 15, 1966
- Designated NHL: December 19, 1960
- Designated DCIHS: November 8, 1964

Tudor Place is a Federal-style mansion in Washington, D.C. that was originally the home of Thomas Peter and his wife, Martha Parke Custis Peter, a granddaughter of Martha Washington. The property, comprising one city block on the crest of Georgetown Heights, had an excellent view of the Potomac River.

== History ==
The original tract of land occupied by Tudor Place was part of the "Rock of Dumbarton" (originally, "Dunbarton") tract in George Beall's second addition to Georgetown, an area also known as Georgetown Heights. In 1794, Beall's grandson, Thomas Beall, sold a portion of his land to Francis Lowndes, a merchant and importer from Bladensburg, Maryland. Lowndes owned the property for eleven years during which he constructed the two wings of the present historic house. Lowndes intended to complete the house but never did, instead selling the property to Martha and Thomas Peter. Martha and Thomas Peter contracted with Dr. William Thornton, who also designed the United States Capitol as well as The Octagon House, to design Tudor Place. From the two wings in existence, Thornton then provided the central structure and the joining elements to the wings - called hyphens, combined them with buff-colored stucco over brick. The "temple" porch and supporting columns provide a most striking addition to the front.

The garden and the collections are as rich and interesting as the home itself. A focal point is the collection of numerous objects that belonged to George and Martha Washington, making Tudor Place the largest public depository of objects belonging to the first Presidential family outside of Mount Vernon.The decorations included four chair-cushions embroidered by Martha Washington in 1801 "executed upon coarse canvas in a design of shells, done in brown and yellow wools, the highlights being flecked in gold-colored silk" as well as a decorative cover for a bed whose trimmings also were embroidered by Martha Washington.

As a historic site that bears the scars of slavery, Tudor Place seeks to look this injustice in the eye. From Martha Washington's will, Martha Parke Custis Peter inherited 90 enslaved people. Enslaved workers and domestic servants worked and lived on site.

On September 28, 1811, Martha Peter's mother, Eleanor Calvert, age 56, a prominent member of the Calvert family of Maryland, Martha Washington's daughter-in-law, and George Washington's stepdaughter-in-law, died at Tudor Place. Martha Peter noted in a February 15, 1812 letter to a friend, Eliza Susan Quincy (1798–1884), how important it was to Martha that she was able to spend the last fortnight of her mother's life with her mother at Tudor Place to render attentions that could not be paid elsewhere.

In March 1813, after resigning his seat in the United States Congress, U.S. educator and political figure Josiah Quincy III and his wife, Eliza Susan Quincy, visited the Peters at Tudor Place. While there, Mrs. Peter gave Josiah General Washington's silver gorget with the ribbon attached to it. Washington's gorget, prominently featured in Charles Willson Peale's 1772 portrait of Colonel George Washington, was a metal collar designed to protect the throat of the wearer and Mrs. Peter had received the gorget at the division of her grandfather's estate. Quincy gave the gorget to the Washington Benevolent Society of Boston in Mrs. Peter's name on April 13, 1813.

On December 18, 1815, and on January 12, 1816, former United States Secretary of State Timothy Pickering visited the Peters at Tudor Place.

Thomas and Martha Peter raised eight children in Tudor Place, and hosted the Marquis de Lafayette during his 1824 tour of the United States. When the third child and eldest son, John Parke Custis Peter, came of age, his father conveyed a farm around Seneca, Maryland. John P.C. Peter built a small replica of Tudor Place from 1828 to 1830 called Montevideo. The farm also included the redstone Seneca Quarry, whose stone Peter would bid on and win the Smithsonian Institution Building project in 1847.

Following the death of Martha Peter in 1854, daughter Britannia Peter Kennon became the next owner of the home. She was the widow of Commodore Beverley Kennon I (1793–1844). following their marriage ceremony in the house.

In about 1869, Robert E. Lee, the former commanding general of the Confederate army in the 1861–1865 American Civil War, paid his last visit to the District of Columbia at Tudor Place before his death on October 12, 1870. By 1874, Tudor Place was occupied by Thos. Beverley Kennon (1830–1890), a grandson of Thomas Peter, a former U.S. Civil War captain with the Confederate Secret Service, and a post U.S. Civil War soldier under the Khedive of Egypt. In 1890, the year that Beverley Kennon died and at a time when Brittania W. Kennon was the oldest living descendant of Mrs. Washington, The Century Illustrated Monthly Magazine published an extensive article that detailed the collection of Martha Washington's relics that were maintained inside Tudor Place.

It was declared a National Historic Landmark in 1960. Tudor Place is located at 1644 31st Street, N.W. and is opened daily as a historic house museum.

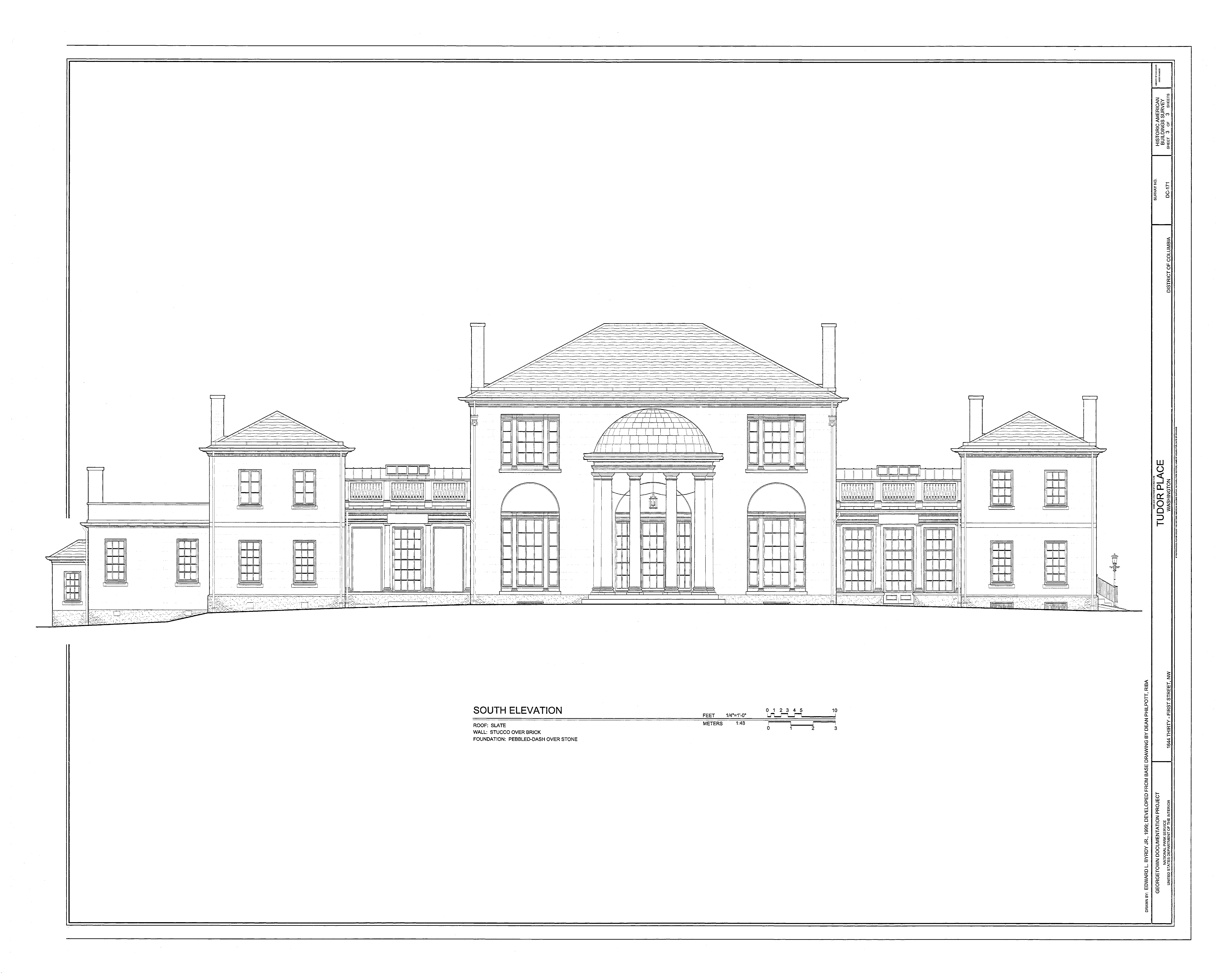
Library of Congress 1999 Historic American Buildings Survey No. DC 171 Architectural Drawing of the South Elevation of Tudor Place at 1:48 scale.

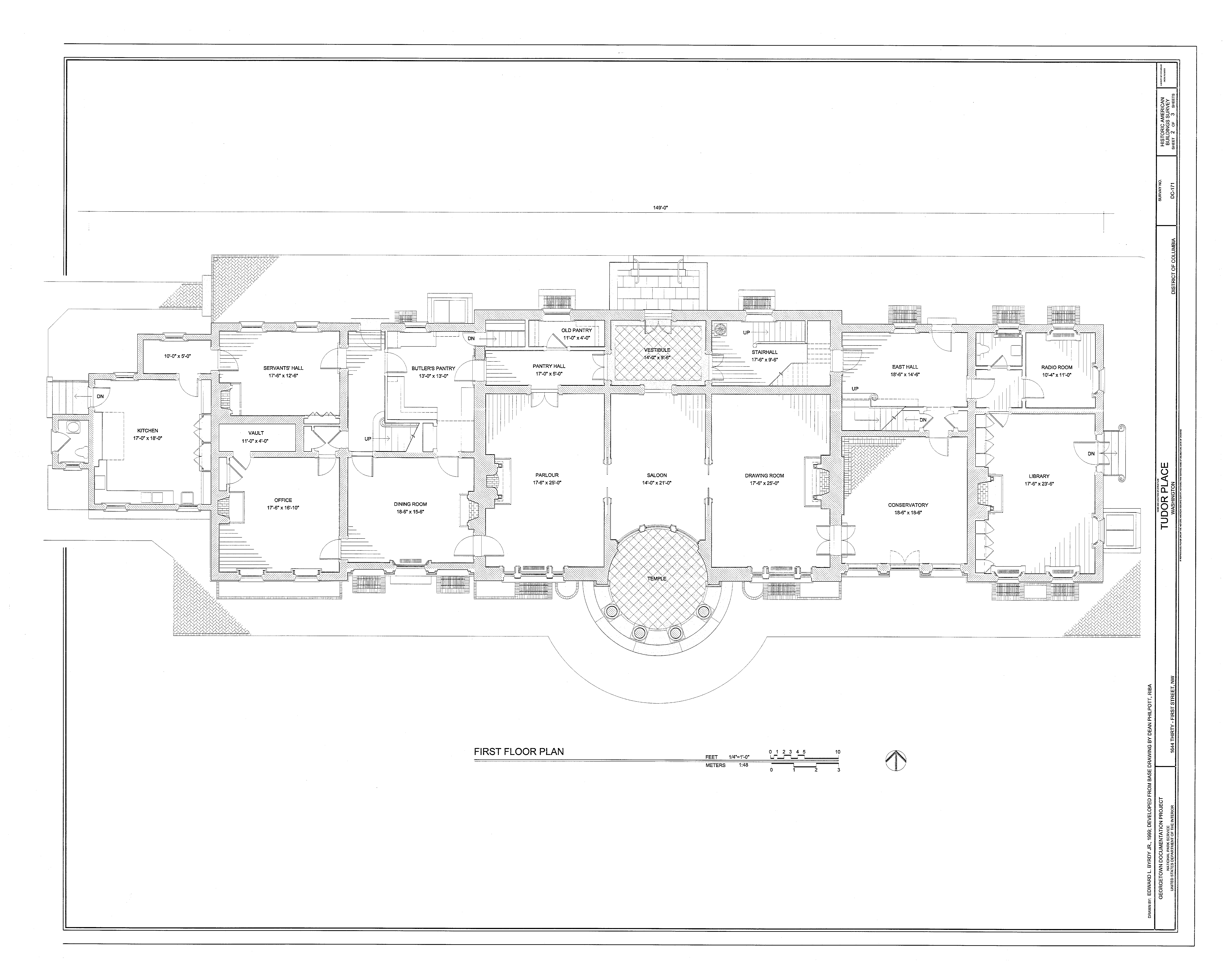
Library of Congress 1999 Historic American Buildings Survey No. DC 171 Architectural Drawing of the Ground floor plan of Tudor Place at 1:48 scale.

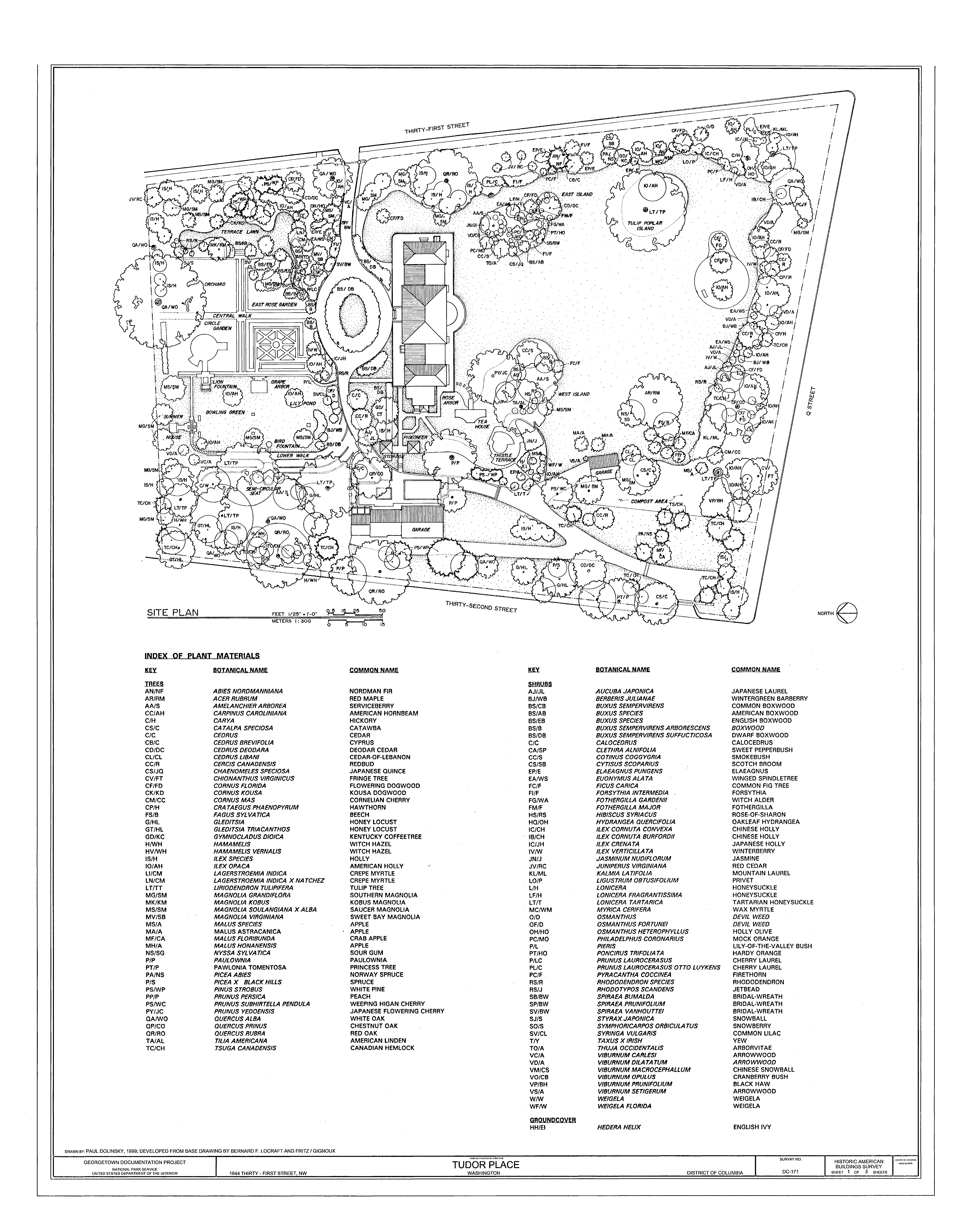
Library of Congress 1999 Historic American Buildings Survey No. DC 171 Architectural Drawing of the garden plan and tree schedule at 1:300 scale.

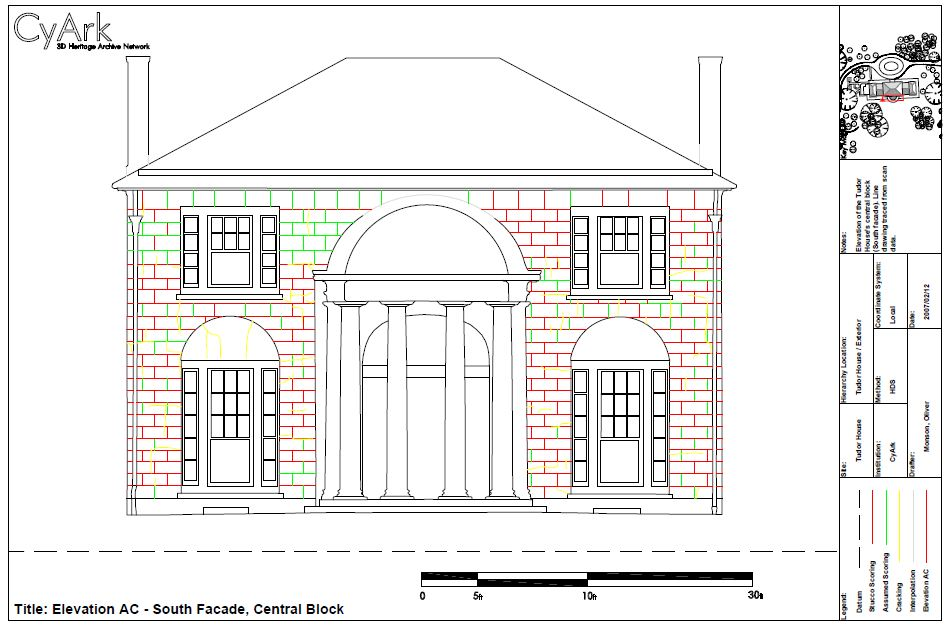
This elevation of the Temple Portico of Tudor Place is from a laser scan project conducted by nonprofit CyArk. The circular Temple Portico that extends into the space of the Saloon is a prominent architectural feature of the house.

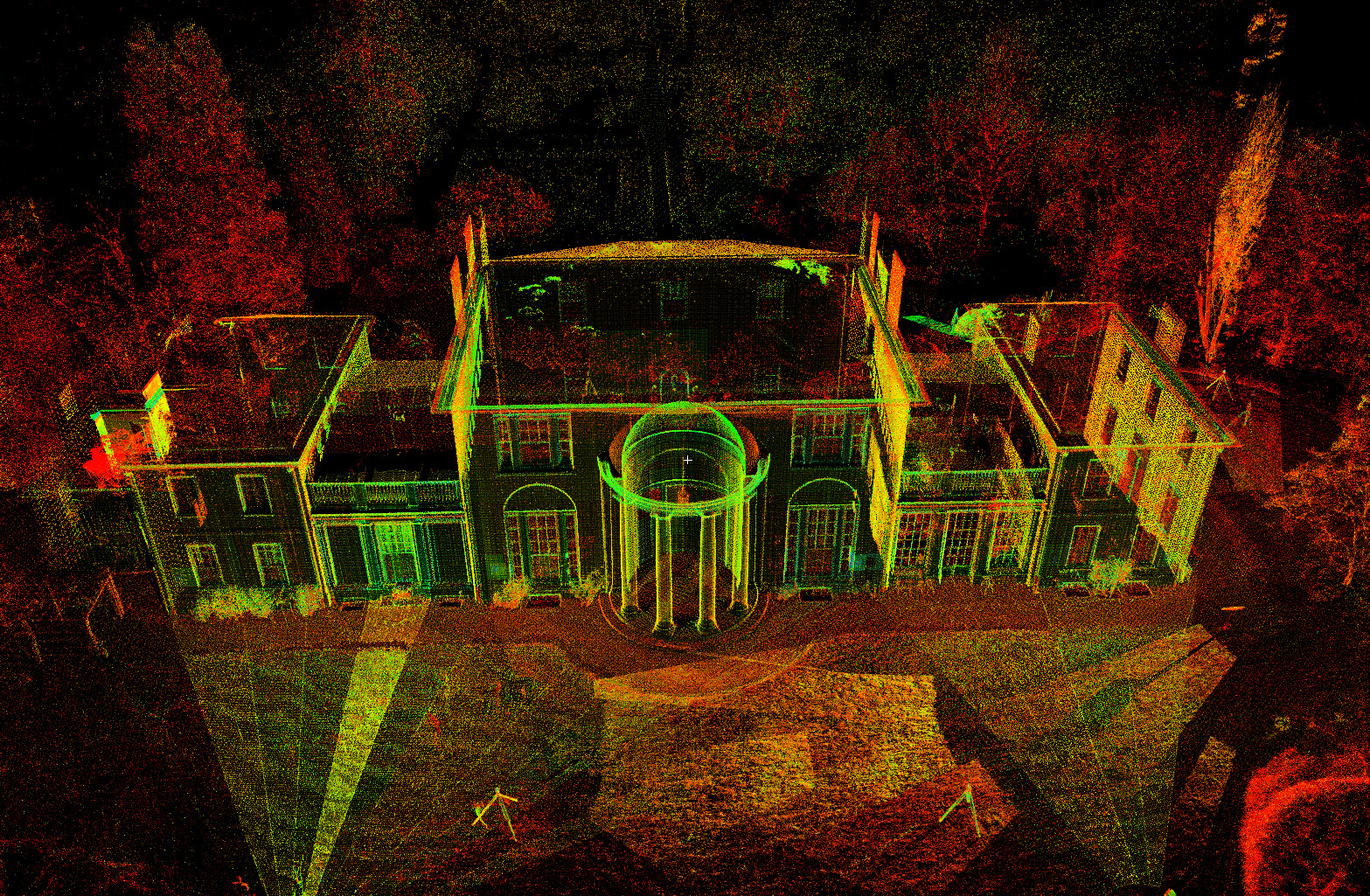
Image of Tudor Place from the South, point cloud data from a Laser scan project conducted by nonprofit CyArk.

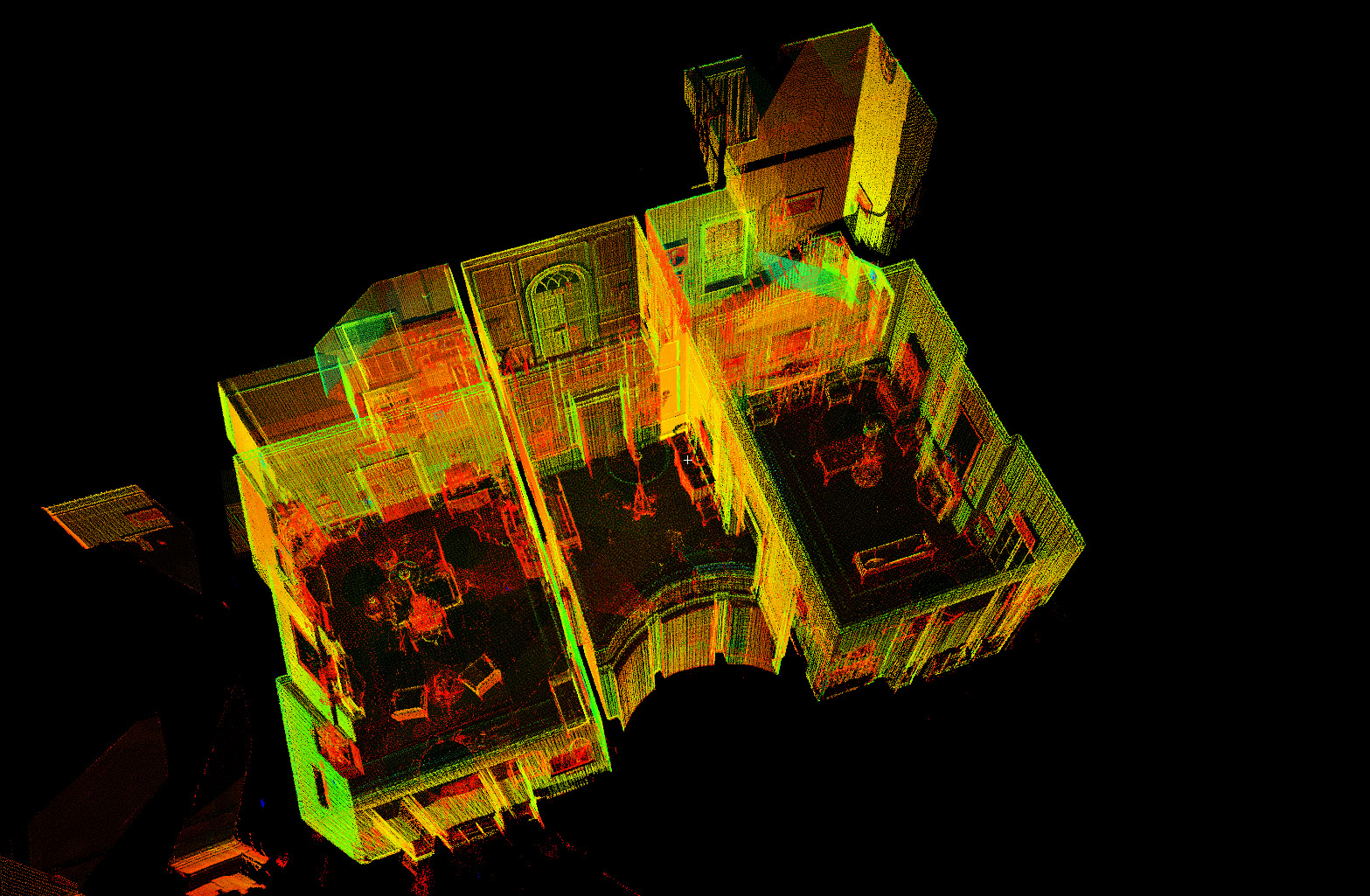
Cutaway image of Tudor Place central interior, point cloud data from a Laser scan project conducted by nonprofit CyArk.

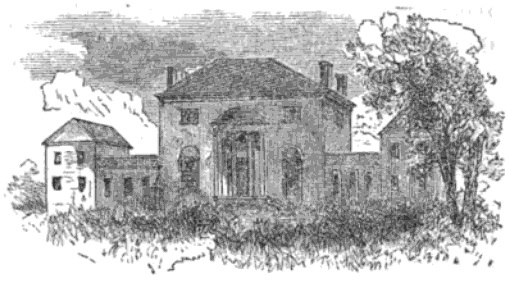
Pre-1874 engraving of Tudor Place.

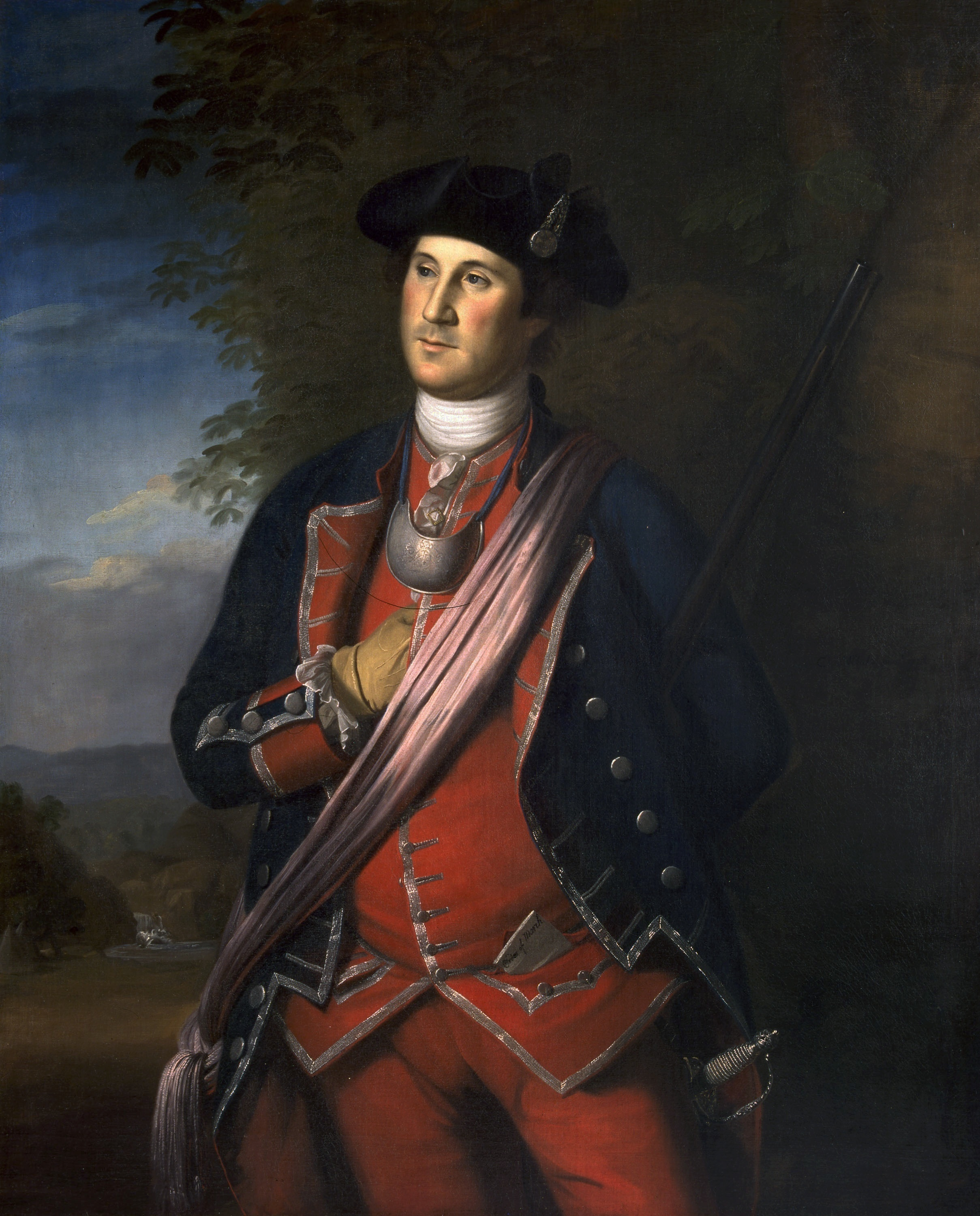
A 1772 portrait of Colonel George Washington by Charles Willson Peale shows Washington's gorget, given to Josiah Quincy III in March 1813 by Martha Parke Custis Peter at Tudor Place.

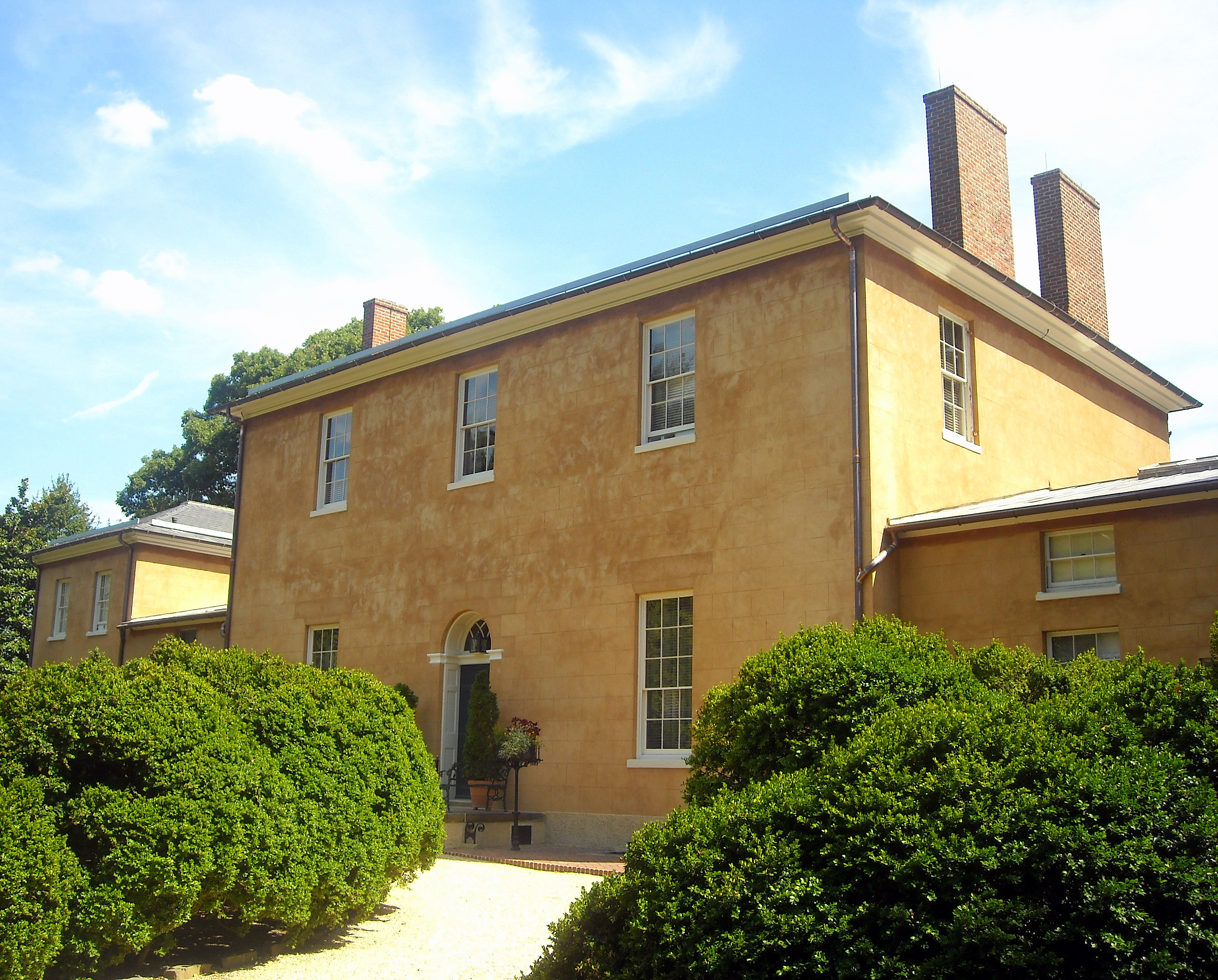
North façade

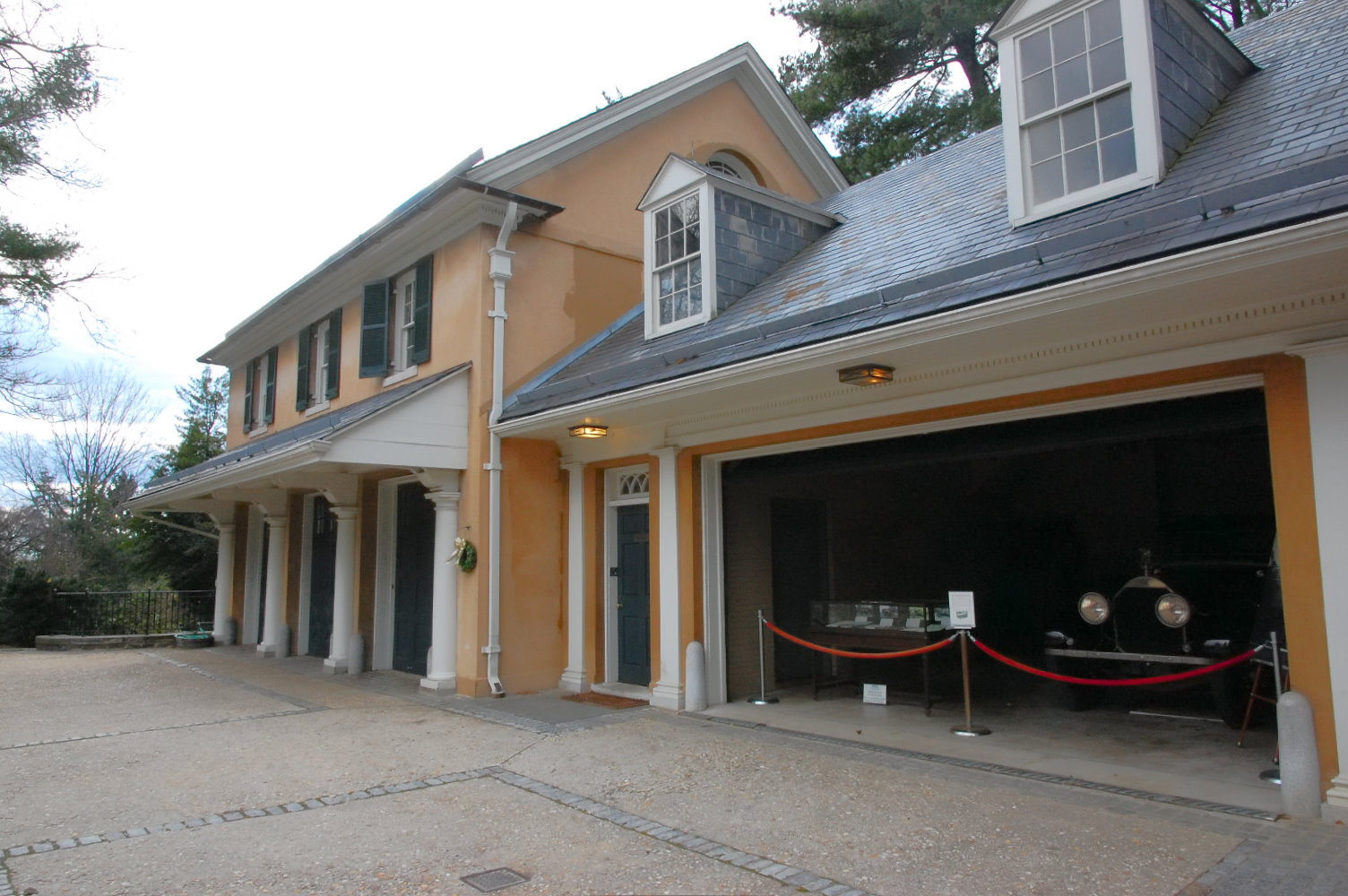
Carriage House

== See also ==
- Architecture of Washington, D.C.
