= Elizabeth Parke Custis Law =

Granddaughter of Martha Dandridge Custis (1776–1831)

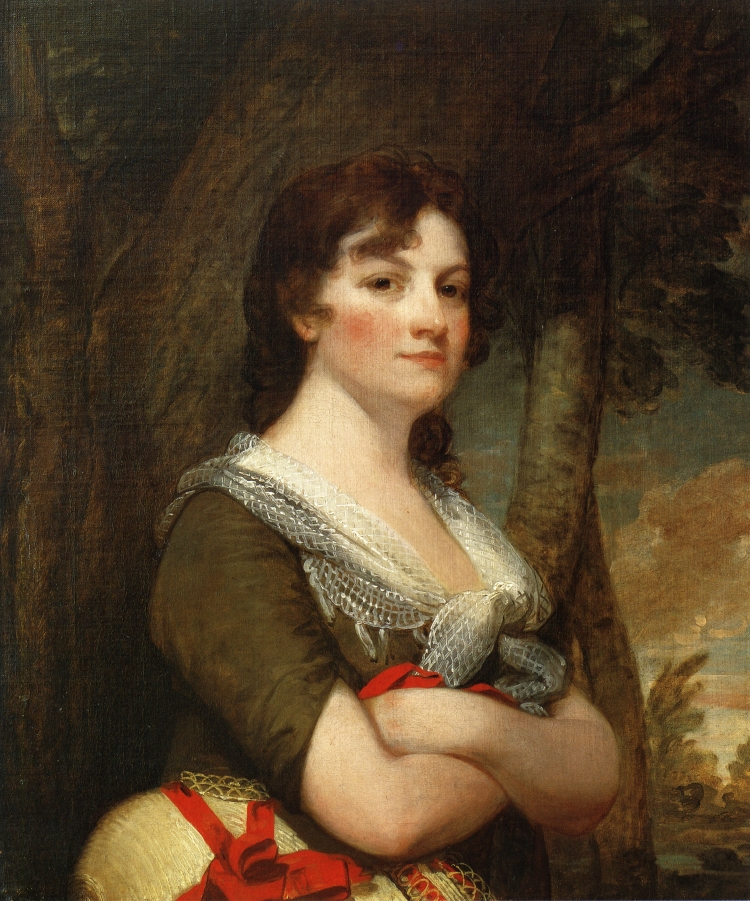
- ^{ Mount Vernon Ladies' Association } 1836 portrait of Elizabeth Parke Custis by Sarah Miriam Peale, after a 1796 painting by Gilbert Stuart
- Born: Elizabeth Parke Custis; August 21, 1776; Maryland
- Died: December 31, 1831 (aged 55); Richmond, Virginia, U.S.
- Burial place: Mount Vernon, Fairfax County, Virginia
- Spouse: Thomas Law (m. 1796; div. 1811)
- Children: Elizabeth Law
- Parent(s): John Parke Custis; Eleanor Calvert
- Relatives: Martha Washington (paternal grandmother); Daniel Parke Custis (paternal grandfather); George Washington (paternal step-grandfather)

Elizabeth Parke Custis Law (née Elizabeth Parke Custis; August 21, 1776 – December 31, 1831), sometimes known as Eliza Law, was the eldest surviving granddaughter of Martha Dandridge Washington and a step-grandchild of George Washington. She married Thomas Law, the youngest son of the late bishop of Carlisle, England, and an experienced administrator with the East India Company.

Eliza Law became a social leader in the District of Columbia, and she worked to preserve the Washington family heritage. She and her husband separated in 1804 and divorced in 1811. They had one daughter who survived infancy and three grandchildren.

== Early life ==
Arms of George Washington Parke Custis

Elizabeth Parke Custis, also known as "Eliza" and "Betsey," was born on 21 August 1776. She was the second daughter of John Parke Custis, the son of Martha Washington and her first husband, Daniel Parke Custis; and his wife Eleanor Calvert, the daughter of Benedict Swingate Calvert and his wife, Elizabeth Calvert. She was also the eldest surviving grandchild of Martha Washington and a step-grandchild of President George Washington; while overall the secondborn grandchild to a US President and First Lady, she was the first to reach adulthood.

Elizabeth's siblings included Martha "Patsy" (1777–1854), Eleanor "Nelly" (1779–1852), and George "Wash" (1781–1857). Elizabeth had three unnamed sisters who had died shortly after birth — an elder sister in 1775, and younger twins in 1780. During their early childhood, the four Custis children were raised at the Abingdon plantation, which their father had purchased.

After the 1781 death of their father, Betsey and Martha continued to live with their mother at Abingdon while their younger siblings, Nelly and George, moved to Mount Vernon to live with George and Martha Washington. In 1783, their widowed mother, Eleanor Calvert Custis, married Dr. David Stuart (1753–1814), a physician and business associate of George Washington from Alexandria, Virginia. Dr. Stuart and his wife remained at Abingdon for the first years of their marriage. Through this marriage, Elizabeth would acquire sixteen half-siblings, including nine more stillbirths or infant deaths.

The Stuart family and the Washingtons remained very close. In 1785, Dr. Stuart purchased an estate, Hope Park, in Fairfax County, Virginia and moved the family there. The girls continued to visit back and forth with their grandparents, and Martha Washington's letters mark these occasions. Elizabeth and Martha were taken often to Mount Vernon in George Washington’s coach. When Eleanor Calvert Custis Stuart went to stay with her mother on her father’s death in 1788, the two sisters remained with Martha Washington.

== Marriage, child and divorce ==
On 20 March 1796, Elizabeth married Thomas Law, the son of Edmund Law, Bishop of Carlisle, and the brother of Edward Law, 1st Baron Ellenborough, George Henry Law, later Bishop of Bath and Wells, and John Law, Bishop of Clonfert and Kilmacduagh in Ireland. Law had come to Washington, D.C. after working for years in the East India Company, and used his fortune to invest in real estate in the new capital. Speculation proved volatile, but he became known as one of the city's wealthiest citizens. He was not always successful in his affairs and eventually lost much of his fortune before his death.

The announcement of Elizabeth's engagement came as a surprise to George and Martha Washington, as Thomas was twice Elizabeth's age. They may not have known that he brought his two natural, Anglo-Indian sons Edmund and John with him to the United States from India. They were educated at Yale and Harvard, respectively, and John became a lawyer in Washington, DC.

Elizabeth and Thomas separated in 1804 and divorced on 15 January 1811.

The couple had one daughter who survived infancy, Elizabeth Law (19 January 1797 – 9 August 1822), who married Nicholas Lloyd Rogers on 5 April 1817. They had three children together: Edmund, Eliza and Eleanor.

== Slaves, residences and possessions ==
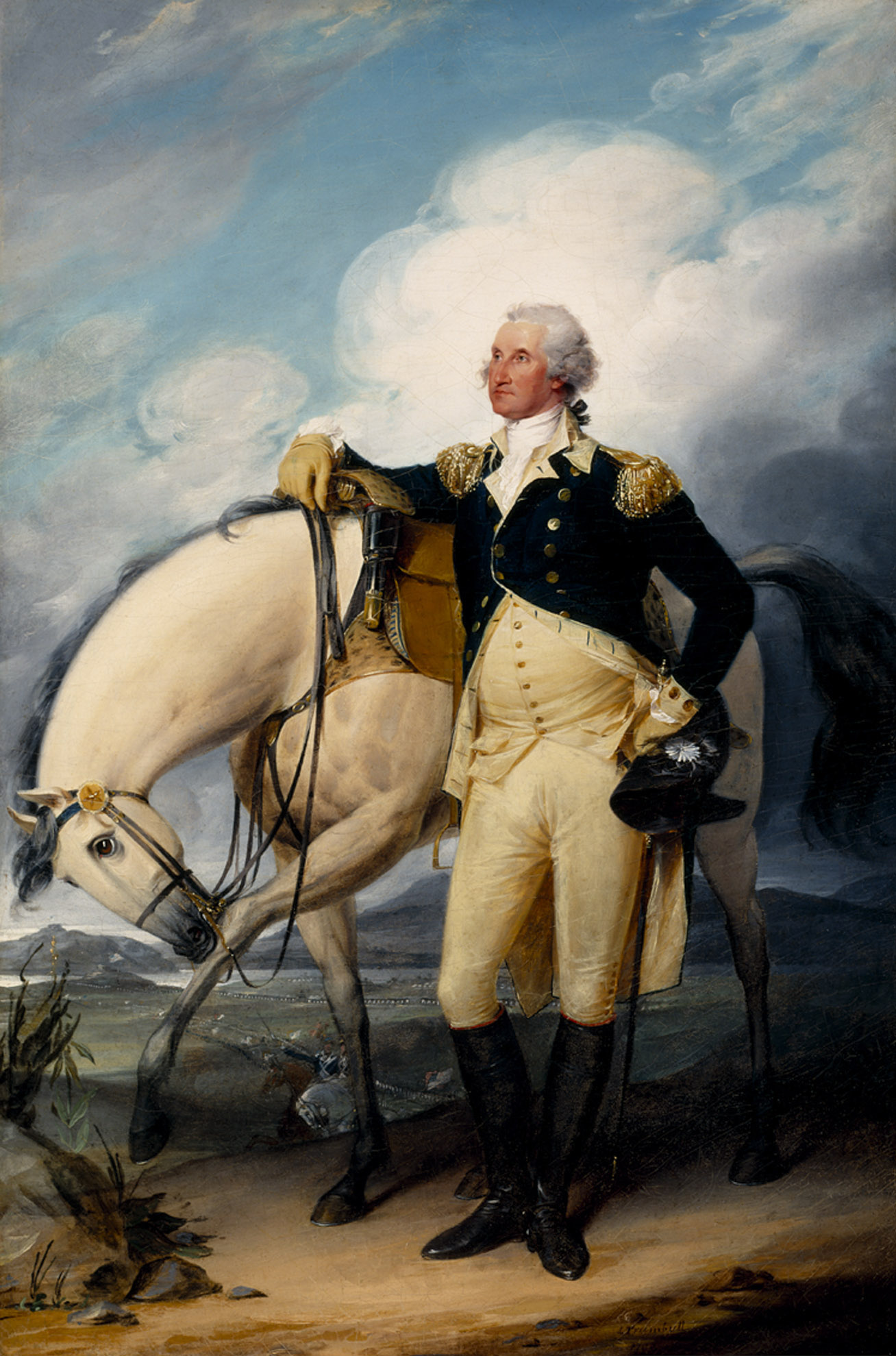
Washington at Verplanck's Point, by John Trumbull, 1790

George and Martha Washington were unable to attend the Laws' wedding, but invited the couple to honeymoon in Philadelphia at the President's House. The First Lady promised one of the slaves in the presidential household, Oney Judge, as a wedding gift to the couple, but the young woman fled after learning of the plan. She reached Portsmouth, New Hampshire, where she remained a fugitive. She subsequently settled in nearby Greenland, New Hampshire, married a free black sailor and had three children. Martha Washington bequeathed Judge's younger sister, Delphy, to the bride and groom instead.

In 1800, Delphy married William Costin, a free man, and lived with him in Washington, D.C. Delphy and her children were manumitted by Thomas Law and Eliza P. Custis Law in 1807. Eliza remained in close contact with William and Delphy Costin throughout her life.

Upon her marriage, Elizabeth Law had inherited about 80 slaves from her late father's estate. After Martha Washington died in 1802, she inherited about 35 dower slaves from her grandfather Daniel Parke Custis's estate. Martha Washington had use of them in her lifetime. Following Elizabeth Law's mother's 1811 death, her father's estate was liquidated, and she inherited about 40 more slaves. She likely sold some of them for her support.

In March 1796, Elizabeth and Thomas moved into the Thomas Law House near present-day 6th and N Streets Southwest. The house became known as "Honeymoon House", as the Laws lived there for a few months while awaiting the completion of their house. They moved at the end of August. The National Park Service listed the house on the National Register of Historic Places on August 14, 1973.

Following her separation from Thomas, Elizabeth resided between 1805 and 1809 at a "small country house" and estate on Seminary Hill in Alexandria, which she called Mount Washington. Mount Washington later was acquired by the Episcopal High School and used as its central administration building; it is now known as Hoxton House.

Martha Washington bequeathed to Elizabeth the John Trumbull portrait of General Washington, Washington at Verplanck's Point, as well as a dressing table and looking glass.

== Death and interment ==
Elizabeth Parke Custis Law died in Richmond, Virginia at the home of a friend "on Saturday night (that is, 31 December 1831), ten minutes before 12 o'clock," according to her obituary in the Richmond Enquirer. (Her death date is sometimes given as 1 January 1832.) Her body was interred in the New Tomb at Mount Vernon on 7 January 1832.

== Settlement and estate ==
Law made a marriage settlement with his wife at the time of their separation, providing for an annuity from certain real estate property. Her son-in-law Nicholas L. Rogers gained appointment as administrator of her estate in December 1832, on behalf of her three grandchildren (his children). He filed suit against the administrator of her marriage settlement for payment of annuities and interest that were outstanding.

After Thomas Law's death in 1834, these issues became tied to settlement of his estate, which was contested for decades. He had made specific bequests for two grandchildren by his late natural son John, as well as for another natural son. He also had made bequests for his three legitimate grandchildren. The case was finally settled in 1854 by a US Supreme Court decision (Adams v. Law), by which time his remaining property was said to have greatly increased in value.
