= Eleanor Calvert =

Calvert family member (1758–1811)

Eleanor Calvert Custis Stuart
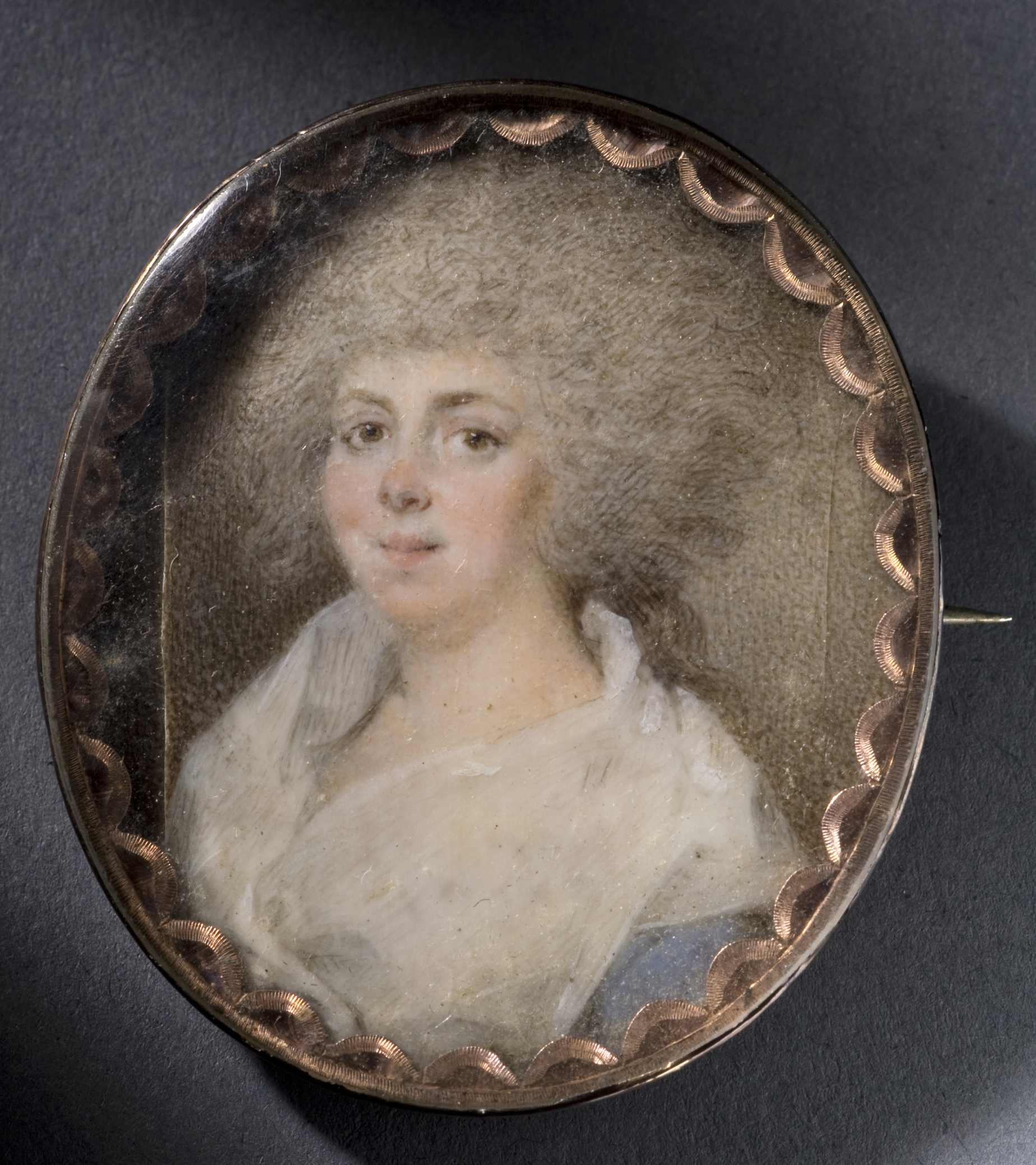
- Portrait attributed to John Ramage, c. 1780
- Born: Eleanor Calvert; 1758; Mount Airy, Upper Marlboro, Prince George's County, Province of Maryland
- Died: September 28, 1811 (aged 57-58); Tudor Place, Georgetown
- Spouse(s): John Parke Custis; David Stuart
- Children: 23, including: Elizabeth Parke Custis Law; Martha Parke Custis Peter; Eleanor Parke Custis Lewis; George Washington Parke Custis
- Parent(s): Benedict Swingate Calvert; Elizabeth Calvert

Eleanor Calvert Custis Stuart (born Eleanor Calvert; 1758 – September 28, 1811) was a member of the wealthy American Calvert family of Maryland. She was the wife of politician John Parke Custis who was the son of Daniel Parke Custis and Martha Custis (later Washington), and the stepson of President George Washington. She and John had seven children. She was widowed when John Parke Custis died of disease at the end of the American Revolution at Yorktown where he served with his stepfather, George Washington. Eleanor married David Stuart, an Alexandria physician and business associate of George Washington on November 20, 1783.

As of 2024, her portrait still hangs at Mount Airy Mansion in Rosaryville State Park, Maryland.

== Early life ==
Arms of the Barons Baltimore

Eleanor Calvert was born in 1758 at the Calvert family's Mount Airy plantation near Upper Marlboro in Prince George's County, Maryland. She was the second-eldest daughter of Benedict Swingate Calvert, illegitimate son of Charles Calvert, 5th Baron Baltimore, and Benedict's wife and first cousin Elizabeth Calvert. She was known to her family as "Nelly".

== Marriages and children ==
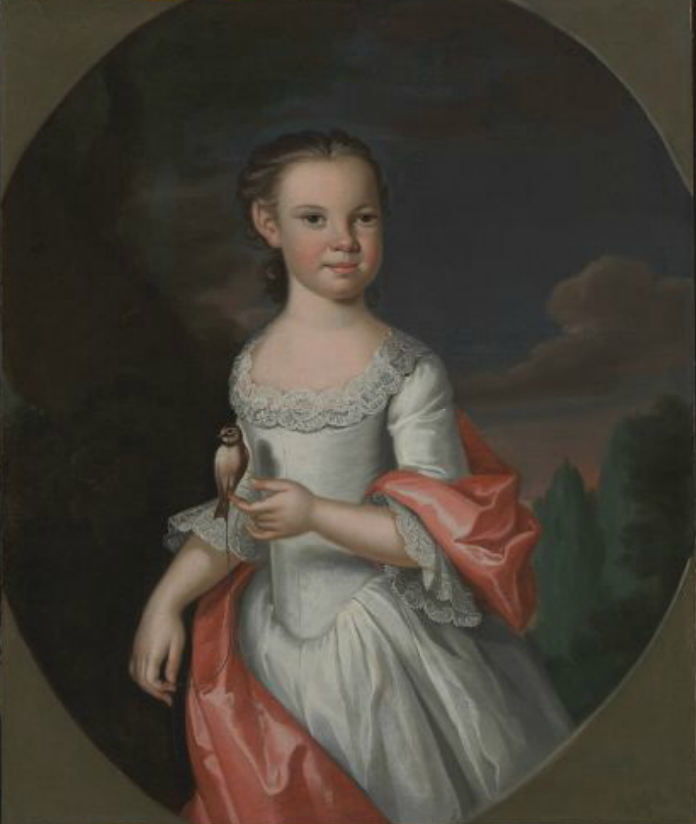
Painting of Eleanor Calvert by John Hesselius, 1761

Eleanor married John Parke Custis, son of Daniel Parke Custis and Martha Dandridge Custis Washington (and stepson of George Washington), on February 3, 1774, at Mount Airy. When "Jacky", as he was known by his family, announced the engagement to his parents, they were greatly surprised due to the couple's youth.

After their marriage, the couple settled at the White House plantation, a Custis estate on the Pamunkey River in New Kent County, Virginia. After the couple had lived at the White House for more than two years, John Custis purchased the Abingdon plantation in Fairfax County, Virginia (now in Arlington County, Virginia), into which the couple settled during the winter of 1778–1779.

Eleanor and John had seven children:

- unnamed daughter (1775–1775), died shortly after birth
- Elizabeth Parke Custis Law, "Eliza" (1776–1831), married Thomas Law
- Martha Parke Custis Peter, "Patsy" (1777–1854), married Thomas Peter
- Eleanor Parke Custis Lewis, "Nelly" (1779–1852), married Lawrence Lewis
- unnamed twin daughters (1780–1780), died three weeks after birth
- George Washington Parke Custis, "Wash" (1781–1857), married Mary Lee Fitzhugh

In 1781, John died of "camp fever", believed to be typhus, following the Siege of Yorktown. Eleanor's two elder daughters, Elizabeth and Martha, continued to live with her at the Abingdon plantation. She sent her two younger children, Eleanor and George, to Mount Vernon to live with their grandmother, Martha Washington, and her husband George Washington, future president. John died intestate, so his widow was granted a dower third, the lifetime use of one-third of the Custis estate assets, including its more than 300 slaves. The balance of the John Parke Custis estate was held in trust for the children of John and Eleanor. The estate was distributed as the daughters married and the son reached his majority while Calvert's share was held by her for her use until her death.

On November 20, 1783, Eleanor married Dr. David Stuart, an Alexandria physician and business associate of George Washington. Her living children became the stepchildren and wards of Dr. David Stuart, even while George and Nelly lived at Mount Vernon with their grandmother, Martha Dandridge Custis Washington and her husband George Washington.

Eleanor and David had sixteen children together:

- Ann Calvert Stuart (1784–1823), married William Robinson
- Sarah Stuart (1786–1870), married Obed Waite
- Ariana Calvert Stuart (1789–1855), died unmarried
- William Sholto Stuart (1792–1820), died unmarried
- Charles Calvert Stuart (1794–1846), married Cornelia Lee
- Eleanor Custis Stuart (1796–1875), died unmarried
- Rosalie Eugenia Stuart (1801–1886), married William Greenleaf Webster
- Nine other children who were stillborn or died shortly after birth

== Later life ==
In 1792, Eleanor, David and their family left Abingdon (which had become part of the District of Columbia) and moved to David's plantation and mill known as Hope Park in Fairfax County. About ten years later, they moved to Ossian Hall near Annandale, also in Fairfax County.

Calvert died on September 28, 1811, at age 56 at Tudor Place, the home of her daughter, Martha Parke Custis Peter, in Georgetown, District of Columbia. She was originally buried at Col. William Alexander's Effingham Plantation in Prince William County, Virginia.

She was reinterred in Page's Chapel, St. Thomas' Church, Croom, Maryland, following the War of 1812 near the graves of her parents. Her resting place remained unmarked until a limestone grave slab was installed in the chapel floor in autumn 2008.

== See also ==
- List of people with the most children
