= Martha Parke Custis Peter =

Granddaughter of Martha Washington

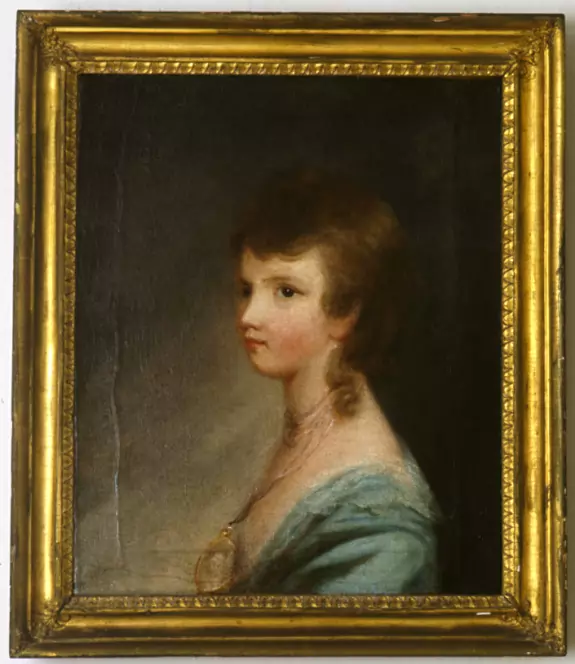
- Born: December 31, 1777; Mount Vernon
- Died: July 1854 (aged 76–77)
- Spouse(s): Thomas Peter
- Parent(s): John Parke Custis; Eleanor Calvert
- Relatives: George Washington Parke Custis, Eleanor Parke Custis Lewis, Elizabeth Parke Custis Law

Martha Parke Custis Peter (December 31, 1777 – July 13, 1854) was a granddaughter of Martha Dandridge Washington and a step-granddaughter of George Washington.

== Early life ==
Arms of George Washington Parke Custis

Martha Parke Custis was born on December 31, 1777 in the Blue Room at Mount Vernon. She was the second-eldest surviving daughter of John Parke Custis, son of Martha Washington and her first husband Daniel Parke Custis, and his wife Eleanor Calvert, daughter of Benedict Swingate Calvert and his wife Elizabeth Calvert.

Martha was named for her father's late sister, Martha "Patsy" Parke Custis (1756–1773). Her siblings included Elizabeth Parke Custis Law (1776–1831), Eleanor Parke Custis Lewis (1779–1854), and George Washington Parke Custis (1781–1857). She was known to her family as "Patsy," like her aunt and namesake.

At first the family alternated between living at the Washingtons' plantation, Mount Vernon in Virginia, and the Calverts' plantation, Mount Airy in Maryland. In 1778, John Parke Custis purchased Abingdon, a 900-acre (3.6 km^{2}) plantation on the west bank of the Potomac River (now the site of Ronald Reagan Washington National Airport). Abingdon was conveniently located equidistant between Mount Vernon and Mount Airy.

== Marriage and children ==
Martha married Thomas Peter in 1795 at Hope Park in Fairfax County, Virginia. The young bride requested from her step-grandfather George Washington a miniature of himself as a wedding gift. Painted in Philadelphia between 1794 and 1795 by Walter Robertson, the miniature was a watercolor on ivory, set in gold, and depicted Washington in his Continental Army uniform.

Martha and Thomas had eight children, but only five of them lived to adulthood.

- Martha Eliza Eleanor Peter (January 20, 1796 – August 31, 1800), died in childhood
- Columbia Washington Peter (December 2, 1797 – December 3, 1821)
- John Parke Custis Peter (November 14, 1799 – January 19, 1848), married Elizabeth Jane Henderson
- George Washington Parke Custis Peter (November 18, 1801 – December 10, 1877), married Jane Boyce
- America Pinckney Peter Williams (October 12, 1803 – April 25, 1842), married William George Williams
- Robert Thomas Peter (November 7, 1806 – October 5, 1807), died in infancy
- Martha Custis Castania Peter (October 5, 1808 – April 5, 1809), died in infancy
- Britannia Wellington Peter Kennon (January 28, 1815 – January 27, 1911), married Beverley Kennon (1793–1844)

== Slaves and inheritances ==
Upon her marriage, Martha inherited 61 slaves from her late father's estate. Thomas almost immediately auctioned them off to raise cash, an action that may have inspired the stern rebuke against the breaking up of slave families that George Washington delivered in his will. Her step-grandfather bequeathed her $8,000, 1/32 of his estate.

Martha Washington died in 1802, and Thomas Peter served as executor of her estate. The Peters purchased at a private sale many objects from Mount Vernon to preserve her grandparents' legacy. Martha Peter inherited approximately 35 dower slaves from Mount Vernon following her grandmother's death (from grandfather Daniel Parke Custis's estate). She later inherited about 40 additional slaves following the 1811 death of her mother (from father John Parke Custis's estate).

== Tudor Place ==
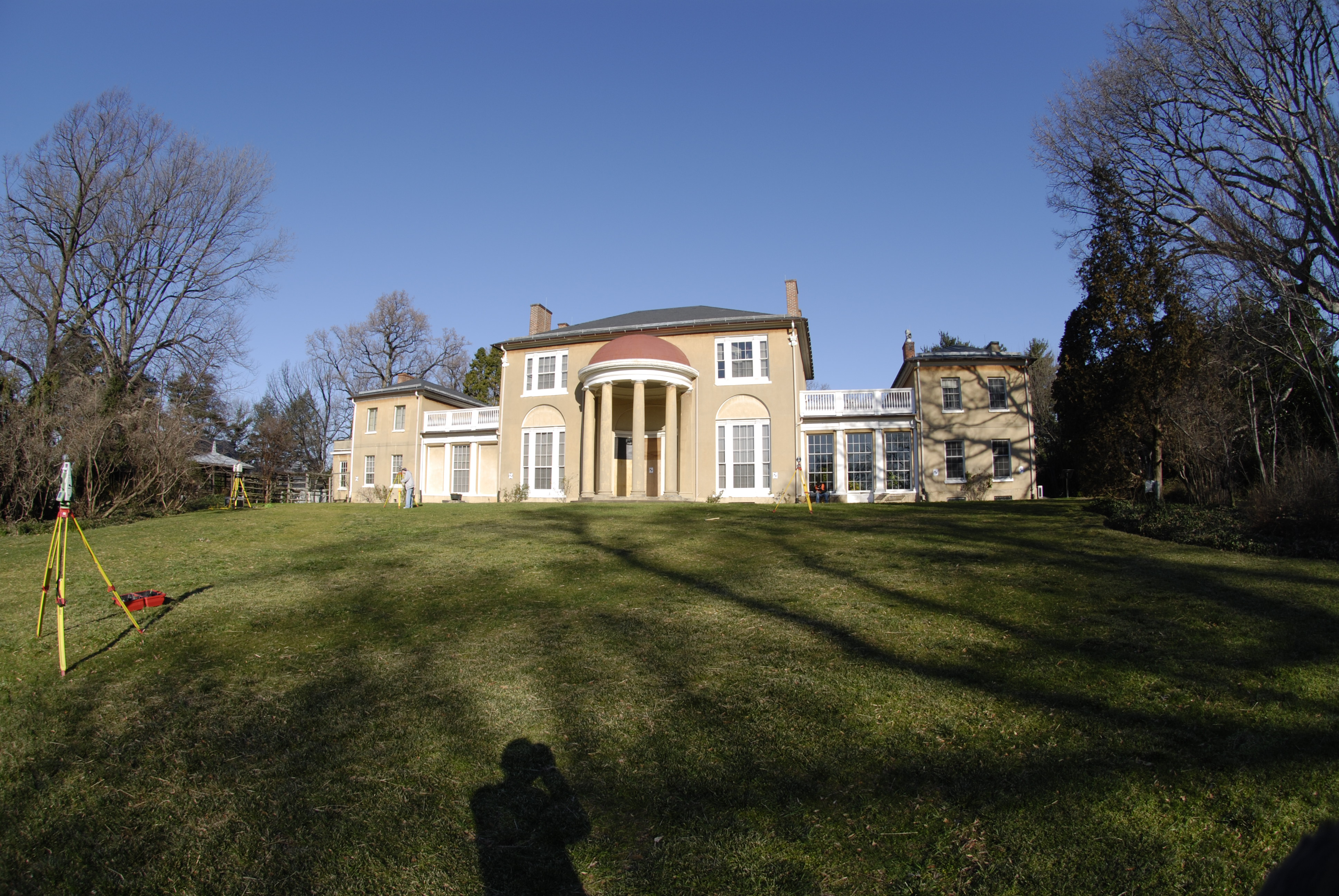
Tudor Place

Her $8,000 (~$192,676 in 2024) inheritance from George Washington was used to purchase property in Washington, D.C. in 1805. The property, comprising one city block on the crest of Georgetown Heights, had an excellent view of the Potomac River. The couple commissioned Dr. William Thornton, architect of the United States Capitol, to design their mansion which they named Tudor Place.

== Later life ==
Martha Parke Custis Peter died in July 1854.
