= John Parke Custis =

American politician (1754–1781)

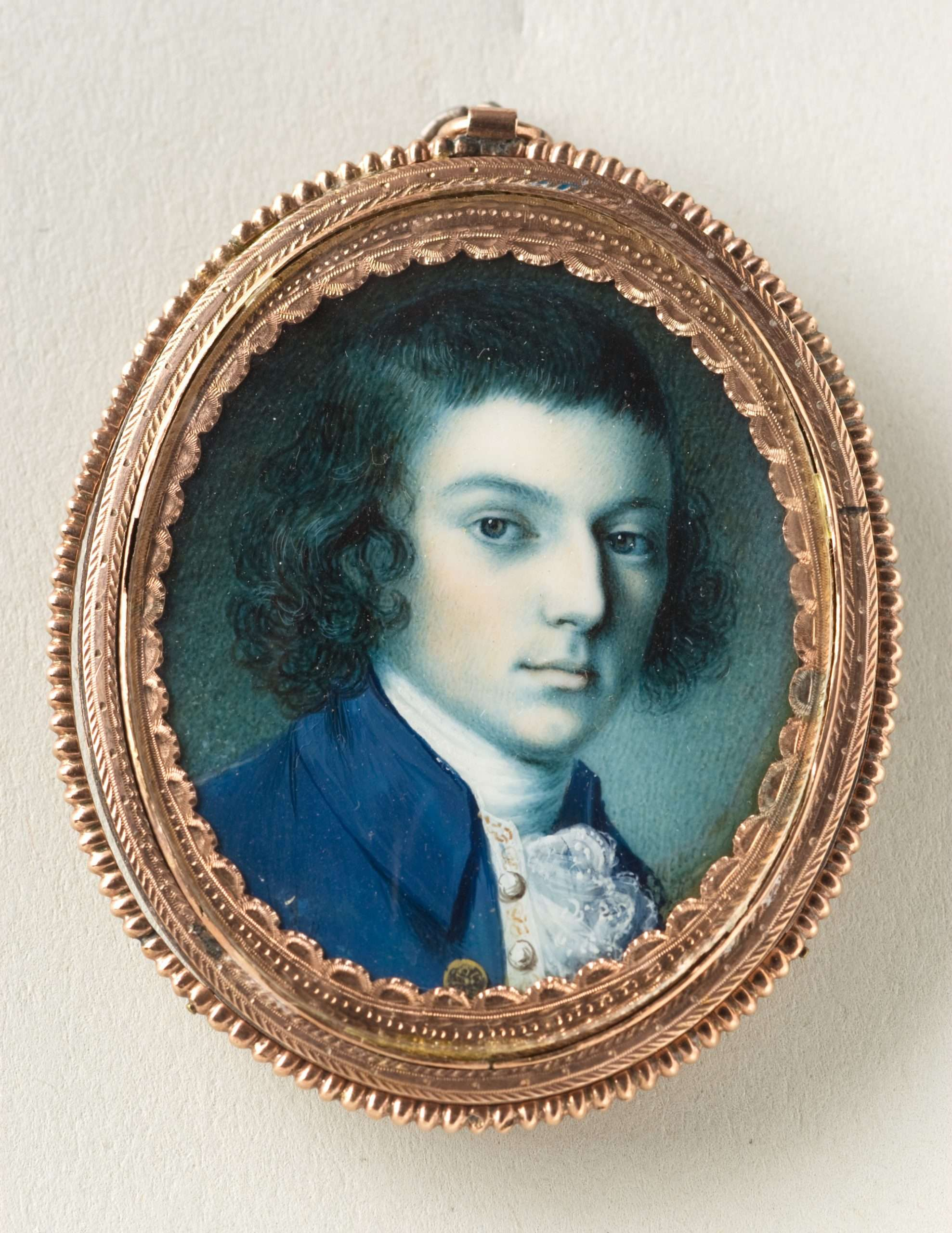
- Portrait by Charles Willson Peale, c. 1774

Member of the Virginia House of Delegates for Fairfax County
- In office May 4, 1778 – March 22, 1781 Serving with George Mason
- Preceded by: Philip Alexander
- Succeeded by: position eliminated

Personal details
- Born: November 27, 1754 White House Plantation, New Kent County, Virginia, British America
- Died: November 5, 1781 (aged 26) Eltham Plantation, New Kent County, Virginia, U.S.
- Cause of death: "Camp fever" (either epidemic typhus or dysentery)
- Resting place: Queen's Creek
- Spouse: Eleanor Calvert
- Children: 7
- Parents: Daniel Parke Custis; Martha Dandridge
- Relatives: Martha Parke Custis (sister)
- Education: Columbia University
- Occupation: Planter, politician

John Parke Custis (November 27, 1754 – November 5, 1781) was an American planter and politician. Custis was a son of Martha Dandridge Custis (later Washington) and Daniel Parke Custis, and later, the stepson of George Washington.

== Early life and education ==
Coat of Arms of John Custis

Arms of George Washington Parke Custis

The only son to survive childhood of Daniel Parke Custis, a wealthy planter with nearly three hundred slaves and thousands of acres of land in five Virginia counties, and the former Martha Dandridge, he was most likely born at White House, his parents' plantation on the Pamunkey River in New Kent County, Virginia. To his family, he was known as "Jacky" as a boy, then "Jack", especially after attaining his inheritance.

Following his father's death in 1757, under Virginia's laws concerning intestacy (dying without a will), almost 18,000 acres (73 km^{2}) of land and personal property including about 285 enslaved persons (worth £30,000) were held in trust for Custis until he came of age. However, the estate prompted a transatlantic legal battle with relatives in the Leeward Islands, which prompted Martha Custis to seek assistance from John Robinson. In January 1759, when Custis was four years old, his mother married George Washington, who thereupon became his legal guardian and the administrator of the Custis Estate. The Washingtons raised Jacky and his younger sister Martha "Patsy" Parke Custis (1756–1773) at Mount Vernon. When his sister died of a seizure in 1773, aged 17 years, Custis became the sole heir of the Custis estate.

His stepfather was not overly fond of Custis, and considered the child troubled, lazy and "free-willed" for taking no interest in his studies. Martha Washington had supervised the boy's earliest education, but by 1761 the family hired Scotsman Walter Magowan as a private tutor. When Magowan returned to England in 1767, Washington sent Custis to a boarding school run by Rev. Jonathan Boucher, initially in Caroline County, Virginia. Although Boucher too considered the boy indolent, the arrangement continued after Boucher moved the school to Annapolis, Maryland. In May 1773 Custis began to attend King's College (later Columbia University) in New York City, but left soon after his sister died.

== Career ==
Not long after reaching the legal age of eighteen, Jacky told the Washingtons of his engagement to 15 year old Eleanor Calvert, a daughter of Benedict Swingate Calvert and granddaughter of Charles Calvert, 5th Baron Baltimore. The announcement greatly surprised George and Martha because both Jack and Eleanor were so young. Nonetheless, on February 3, 1774, Custis married Eleanor at her family's Mount Airy estate. Its restored mansion is the center of Rosaryville State Park in Prince George's County, Maryland. As discussed below, the couple would have six daughters and a son, of whom four reached adulthood.

=== Planter ===
After their marriage, the couple settled at his father's White House plantation in rural New Kent County. However, after two years, Custis sold the Custis family's town lots in Jamestown and Williamsburg, as well as several plantations in King and Queen, Hanover and New Kent counties in order to purchase two plantations in northern Virginia (in then-vast Fairfax County) closer to his step father's Mount Vernon plantation. One tract of 1,100 acres (4.5 km^{2}) acres which Custis named "Arlington" was bought outright for £12,000 (and later became Arlington National Cemetery). The other plantation, 904 acres (3.66 km^{2}) acres called Abingdon (now Reagan National Airport in Arlington County, Virginia), Custis purchased on unfavorable terms: a mortgage at £12 per acre, with substantial annual payments over £2,000 each year, and the principal due in 1802. Washington believed Abingdon's owner, Robert Alexander, took advantage of Custis's inexperience and eagerness. When he learned of the purchase terms, George Washington informed Custis that "No Virginia Estate (except a few under the best management) can stand simple Interest how then can they bear compound Interest".

Nonetheless, the couple settled there during the winter of 1778–1779. Custis' behavior in this and other matters prompted George Washington to write in 1778: "I am afraid Jack Custis, in spite of all of the admonition and advice I gave him about selling faster than he bought, is making a ruinous hand of his Estate." By 1781, the financial strains of the Abingdon purchase had almost bankrupted Custis. He tried to renegotiate the terms before his death, and afterward David Stuart as guardian of Custis' minor children, reconveyed it to its former owner after paying £2,400 in rent for the period the estate had been in Custis hands.

Most historians agree Custis did not join the Continental Army due to the determined opposition of his stepfather, as well as his mother, for Custis was her only son. However, one account claimed Custis served on Washington's staff during the Siege of Boston in 1775–1776 and as an emissary to the British forces there.

=== Politician ===
In 1778, Custis ran for a seat in the Virginia House of Delegates from both New Kent County and Fairfax County. Custis became one of the two Fairfax County delegates, alongside his stepfather's neighbor and mentor George Mason, and both were re-elected twice before Custis' death, after which only Benjamin Dulaney represented the county for the 1781/2 term. Washington at least once chided Custis concerning his habitual late arrival.

== Personal life ==
Custis and Eleanor had seven children during their marriage, three of whom died in infancy:

- unnamed daughter (1775–1775), died shortly after birth
- Elizabeth "Eliza" Parke Custis (1776–1831), married Thomas Law, an English immigrant
- Martha "Patsy" Parke Custis (1777–1854), married Thomas Peter
- Eleanor "Nelly" Parke Custis (1779–1852), married Lawrence Lewis
- unnamed twin daughters (1780–1780), died three weeks after birth
- George Washington "Washy" Parke Custis (1781–1857), married Mary Lee Fitzhugh.

Speculation has also linked Custis as the possible father of William Costin (1780-1842), born to Custis slave Ann (Nancy) Dandridge-Costin.

== Death ==
In September 1781 Custis persuaded Washington to let him serve as a civilian aide-de-camp to Washington during the siege of Yorktown. En route to Yorktown he also made inquiries about 17 slaves who had reportedly fled to British lines. However, the crowded camps near the battlefield were rife with smallpox and malaria, and Custis contracted "camp fever", which could have been an illness now labelled epidemic typhus, or dysentery while at Yorktown. He was moved 30 miles upriver to Eltham plantation the home of his uncle Colonel Burwell Bassett (Martha Washington's brother-in-law), where Martha Washington as well as his wife Eleanor (both of whom had journeyed to Williamsburg a few weeks before) attempted to help nurse him. Shortly after the surrender of Cornwallis, Custis died on November 5, 1781, at Eltham. He was buried at his family's plot at their Queen's Creek plantation, in York County, near Williamsburg, Virginia. However, if any grave marker had been erected, none remained by 1895 when the remaining Custis gravestones were moved to Bruton Parish Church. With his mother's marriage to George Washington in 1759 and George Washington's presidency beginning in 1789, Custis retroactively became the first child of a US President to have died during military service.

With Custis's death at 26, his widow sent their two youngest children (Eleanor/Nelly and George/Washy) to Mount Vernon to be raised by the Washingtons. In 1783, she married David Stuart of Alexandria, Virginia, with whom she had at least seven additional children who survived infancy.

Although Custis had become well-established at Abingdon, his financial affairs were in disarray because of his poor business judgement as well as wartime conditions. After Custis died in 1781, administrators of the Custis Estate negotiated for more than a decade to end the Abington transaction. Because Custis died intestate, his estate was not fully liquidated until the 1811 death of his widow. His four children inherited more than 600 slaves.

Part of the Abingdon estate is now on the grounds of Ronald Reagan Washington National Airport. When he purchased Abingdon, Custis also bought a nearby property that after his death became Arlington Plantation and later, Arlington National Cemetery.
