= Ossian Hall =

Coordinates: 38.82556°N 77.21167°W

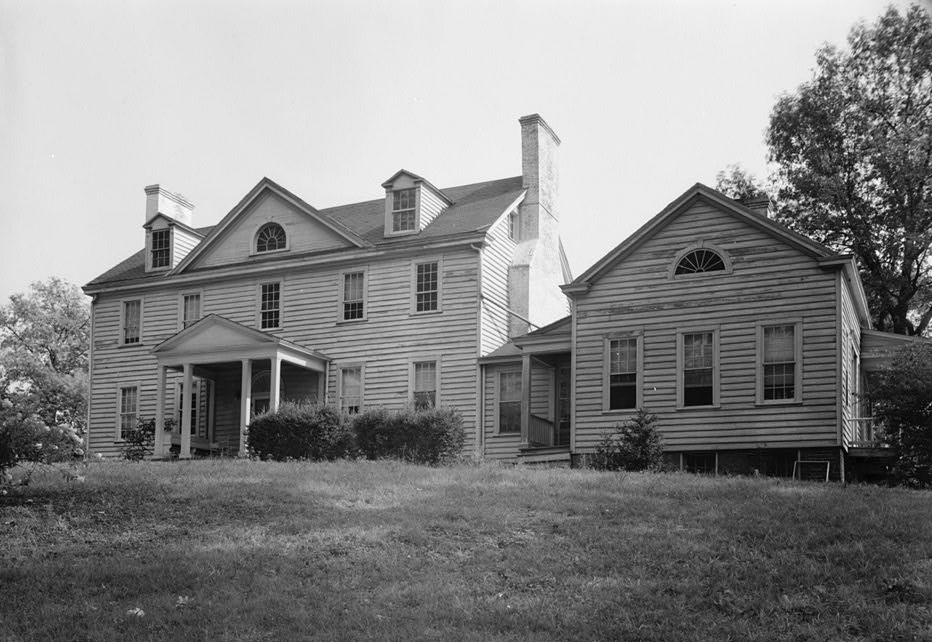
- Ossian Hall, front elevation, Annandale, Virginia.

Ossian Hall was an 18th-century plantation house in Annandale, Fairfax County, Virginia. Ossian Hall was one of three large residences, along with Oak Hill, and Ravensworth, owned by the Fitzhugh family in Fairfax County.

== Location ==
Ossian Hall was located north of Braddock Road and east of the Capital Beltway (Interstate 495).

== History ==
Ossian Hall was built on the Ravensworth land grant by Nicholas Fitzhugh, son of Henry Fitzhugh. In 1804, Dr. David Stuart, a commissioner for the Federal City, purchased Ossian Hall and relocated there with his wife, Eleanor Calvert Custis Stuart, and their children.

Francis Asbury Dickins, a Washington attorney and son of Secretary of the United States Senate Asbury Dickins, used the home as a summer residence until the outbreak of the Civil War, when it became his year-round residence. All three of the Fitzhugh estates were protected by orders from both sides throughout the war.

Joseph L. Bristow, an American politician from Kansas, purchased Ossian Hall in 1918 and died there on July 14, 1944.

On September 3, 1959, Ossian Hall was burned as a training exercise for the Annandale Fire Department.

== Image gallery ==
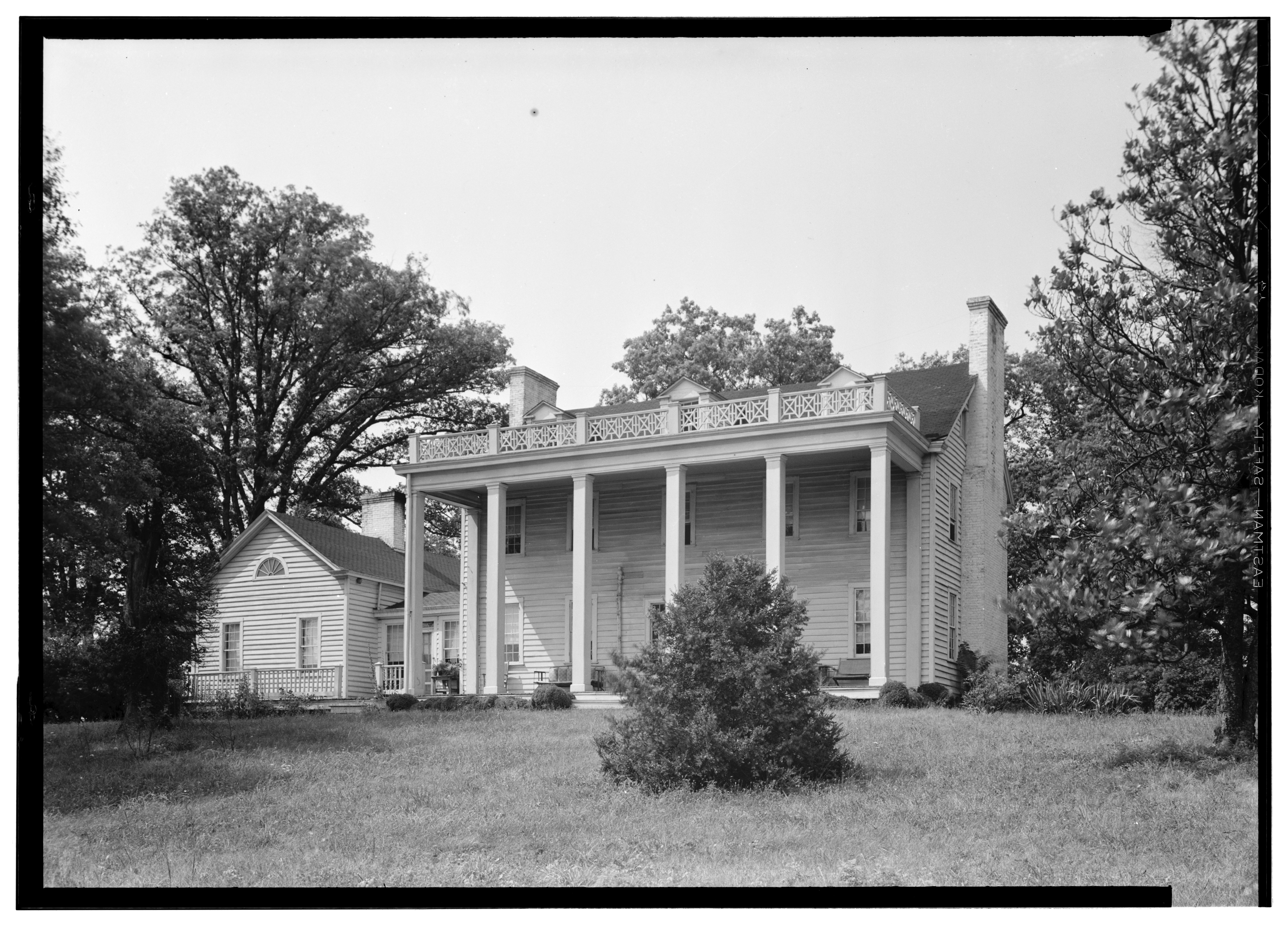
Rear elevation

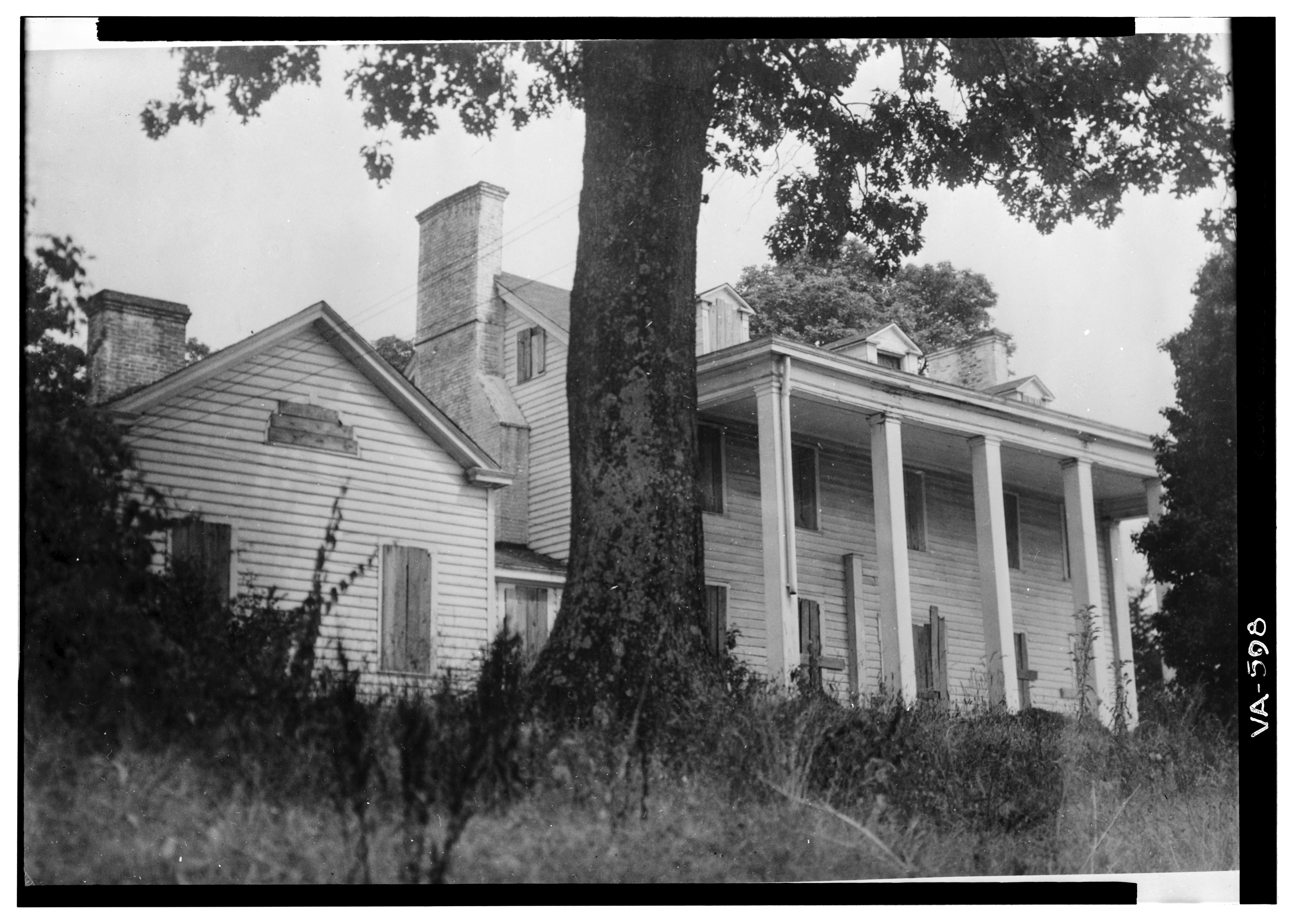
Rear elevation

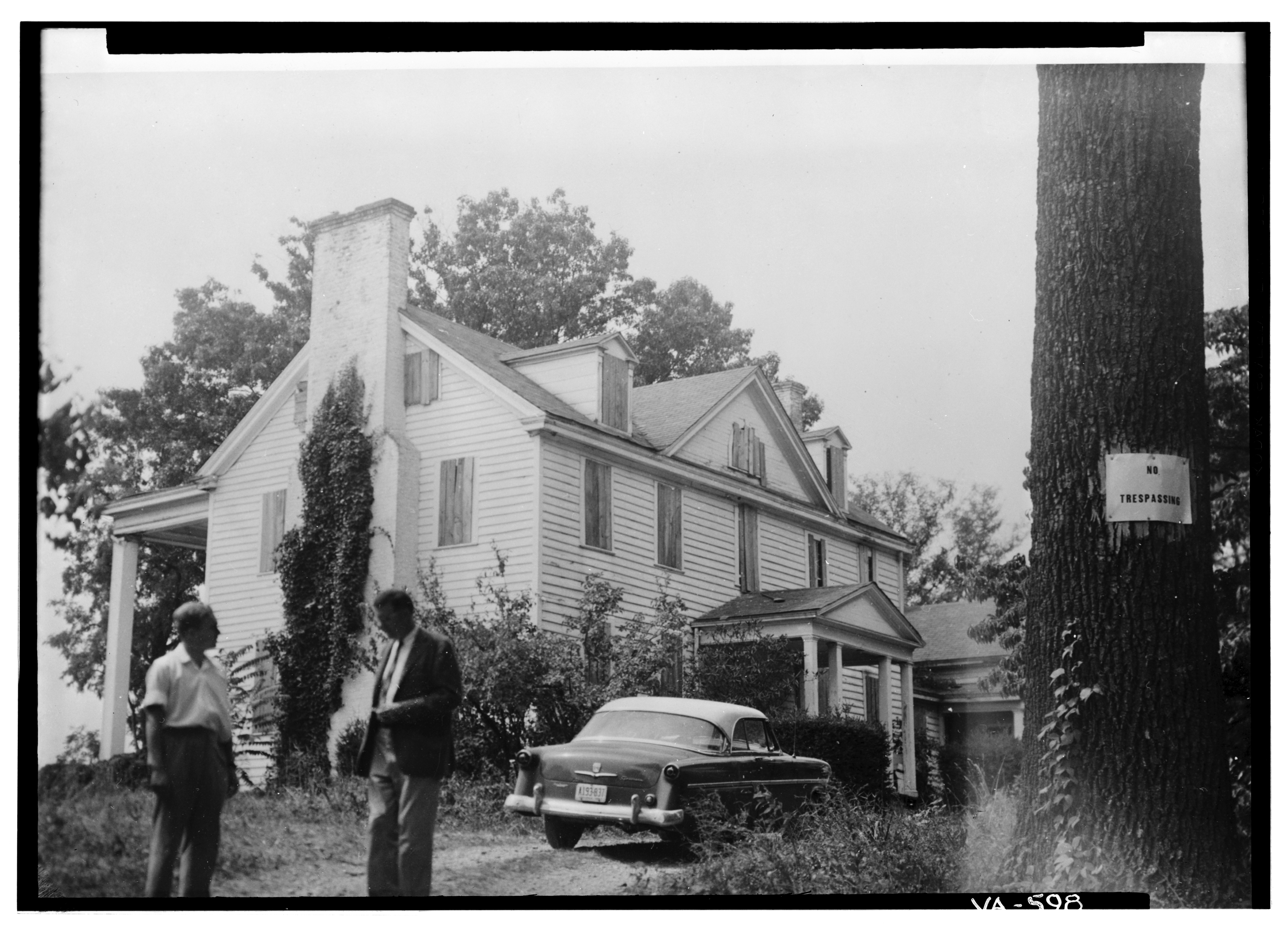
Front elevation

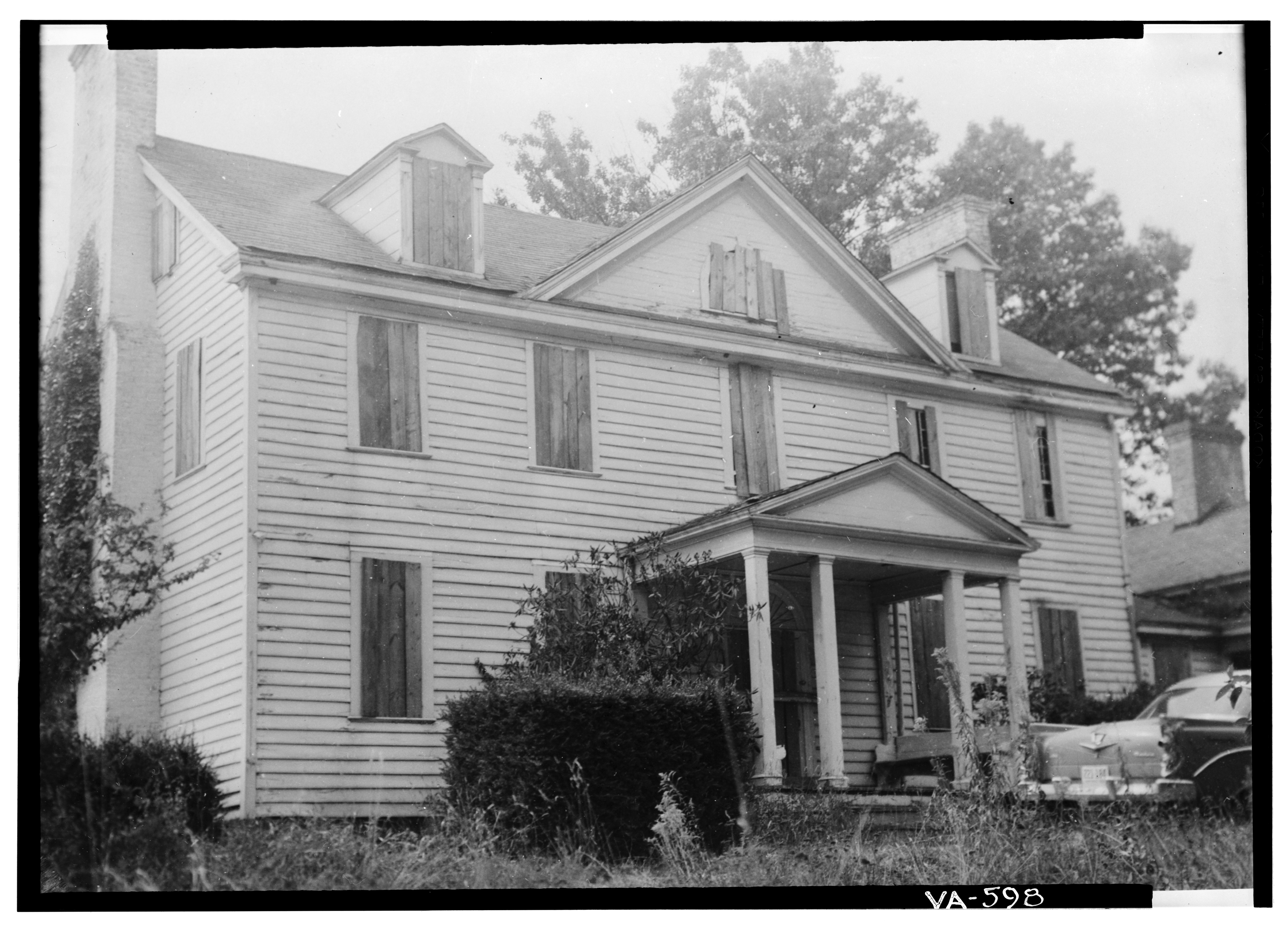
Front elevation

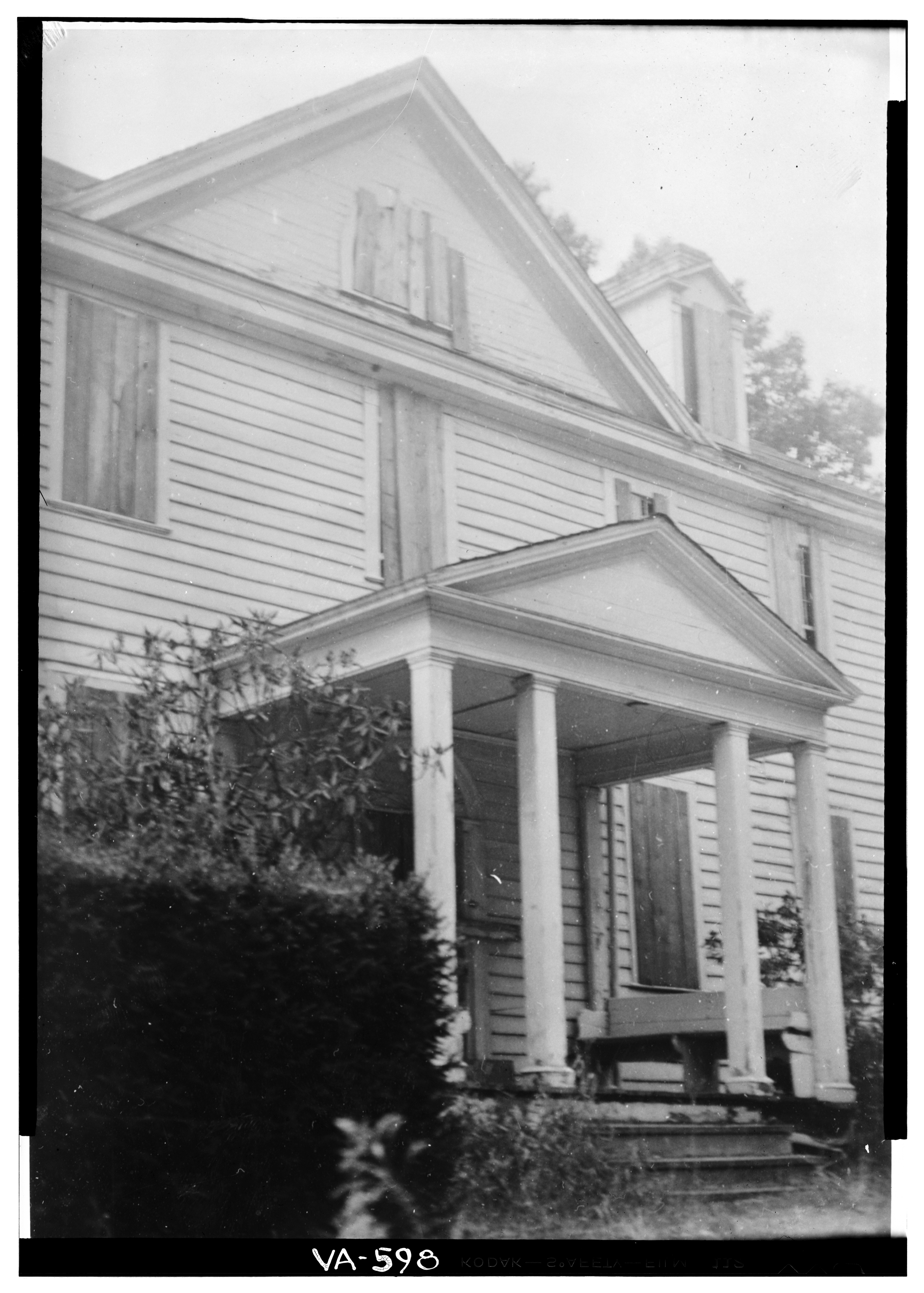
Front entrance

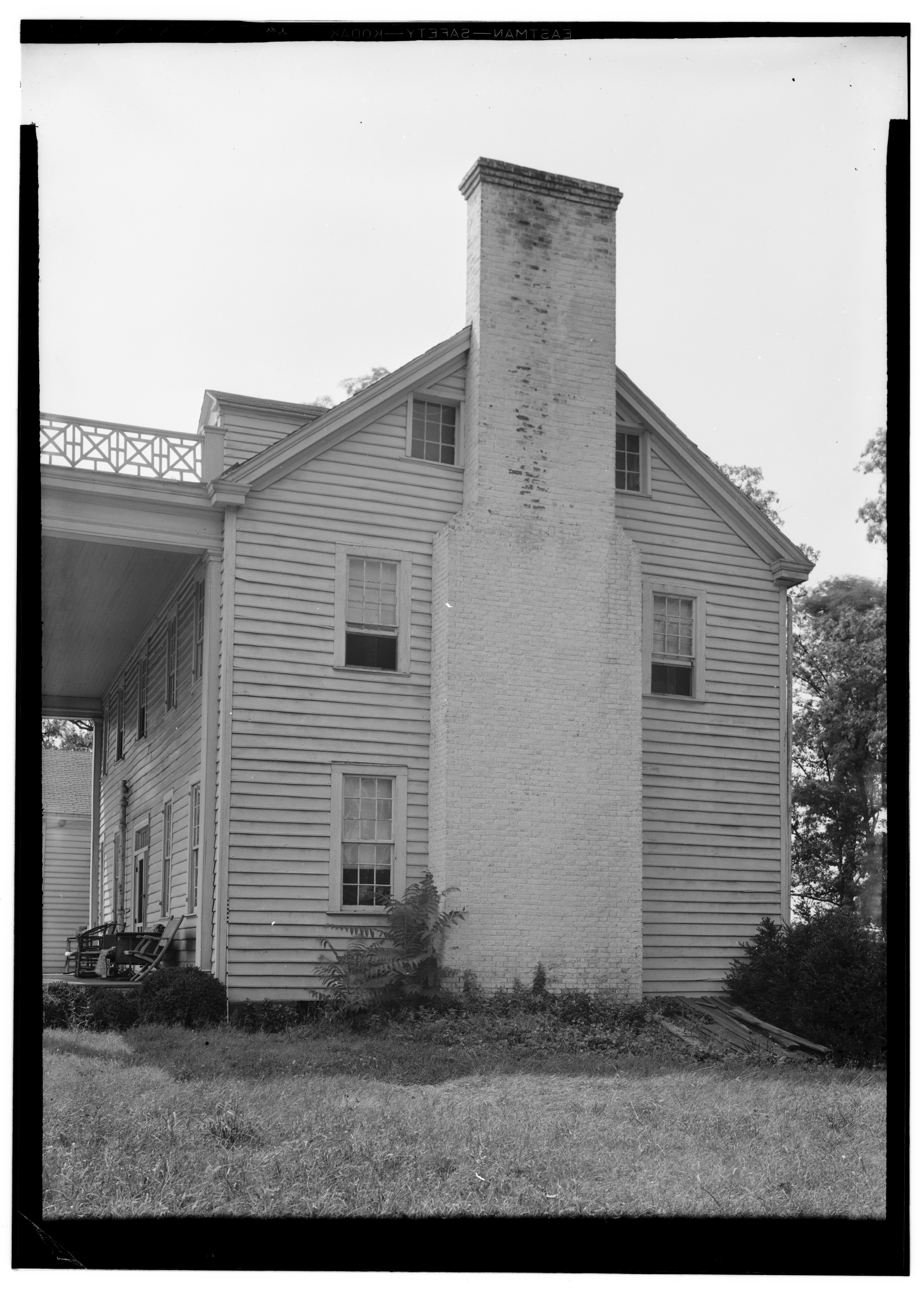
Side elevation

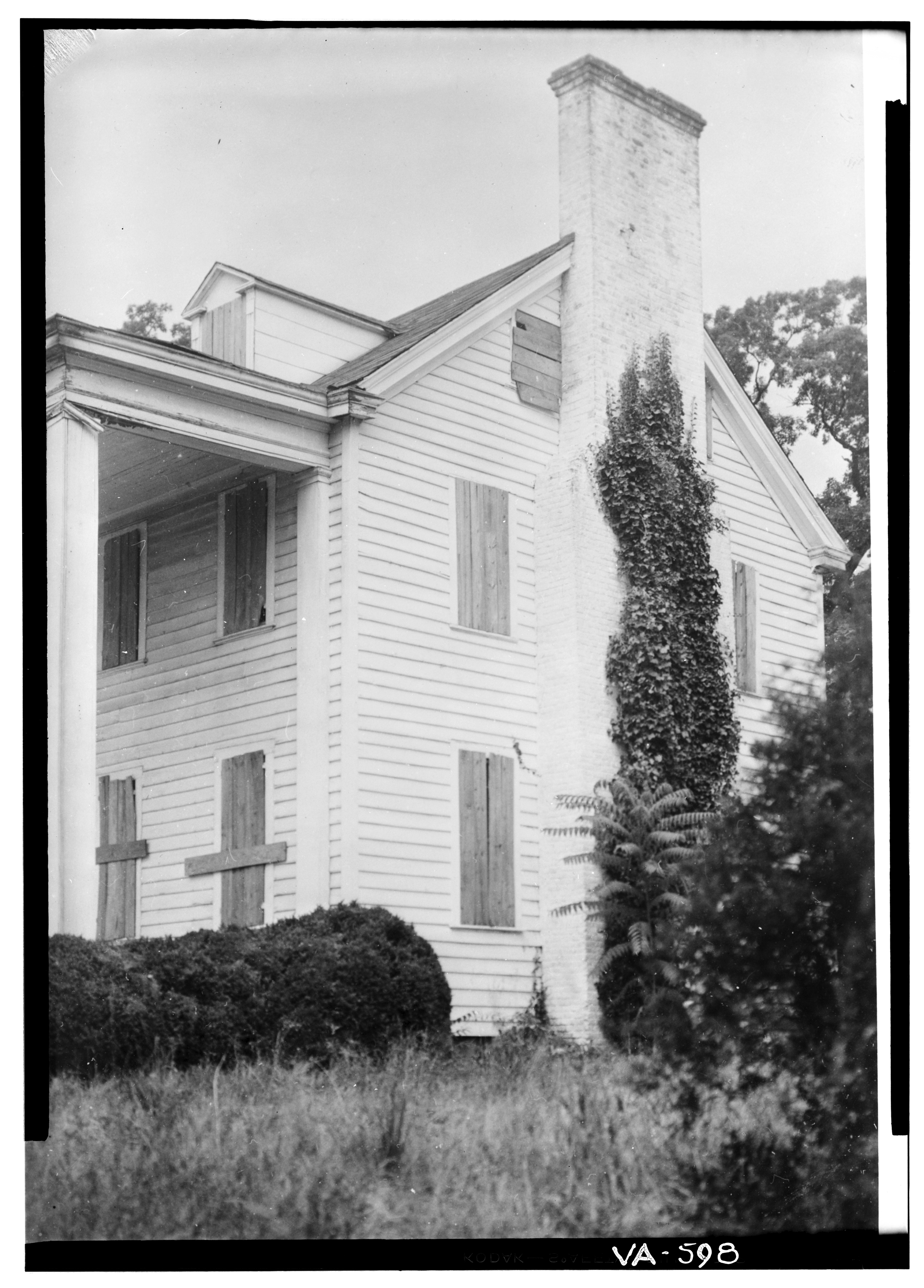
Side elevation

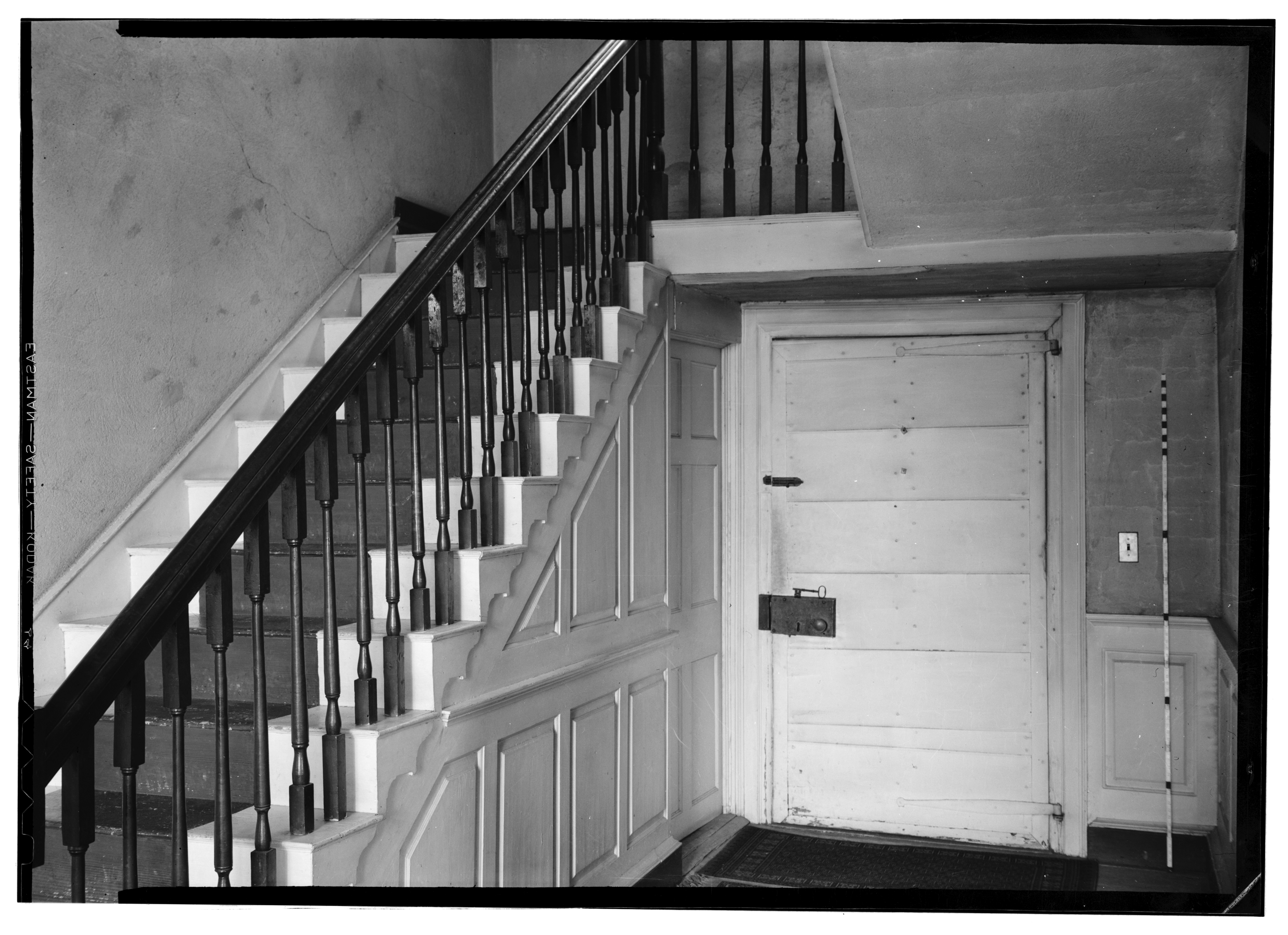
Interior staircase

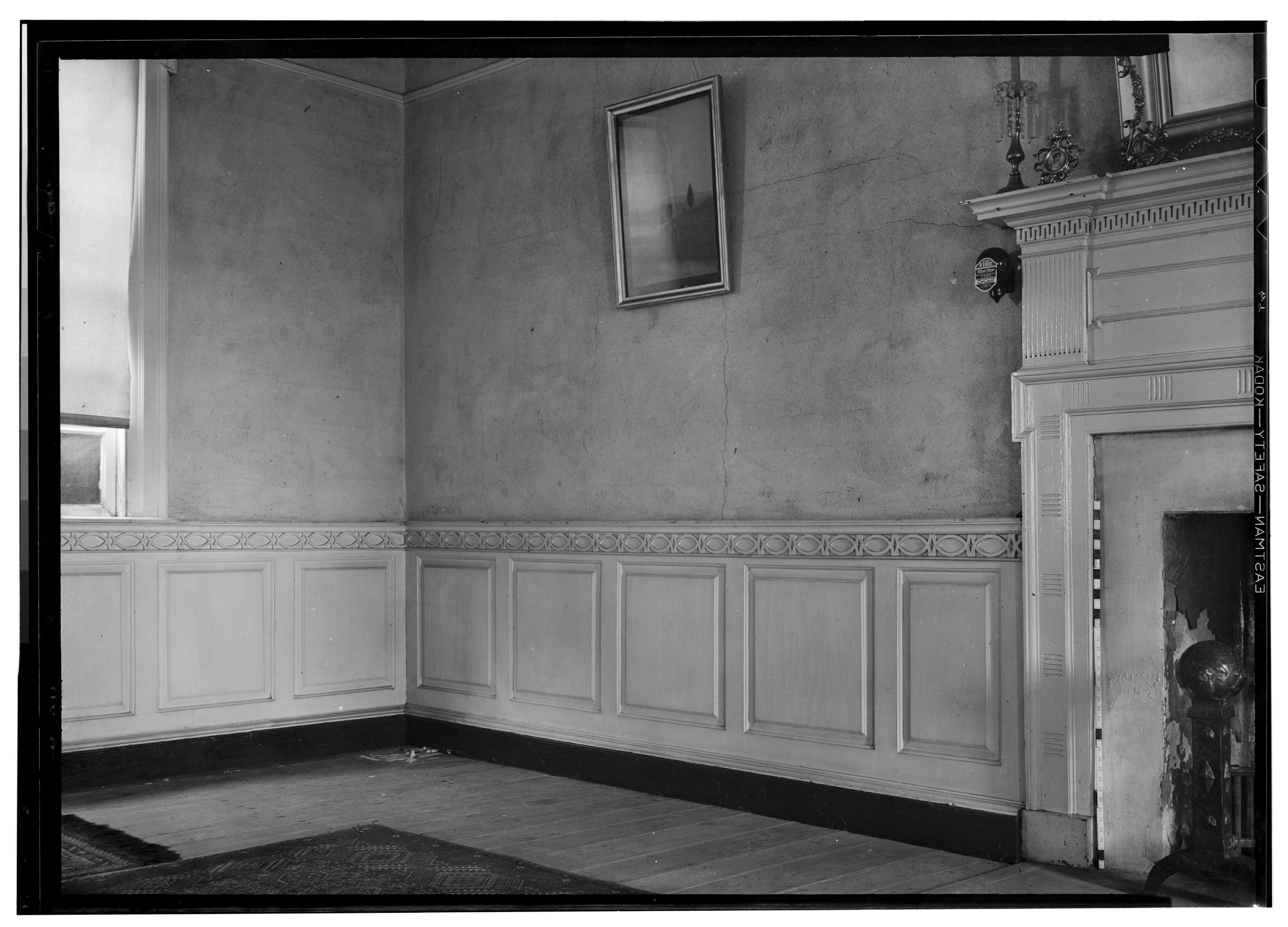
Interior paneling

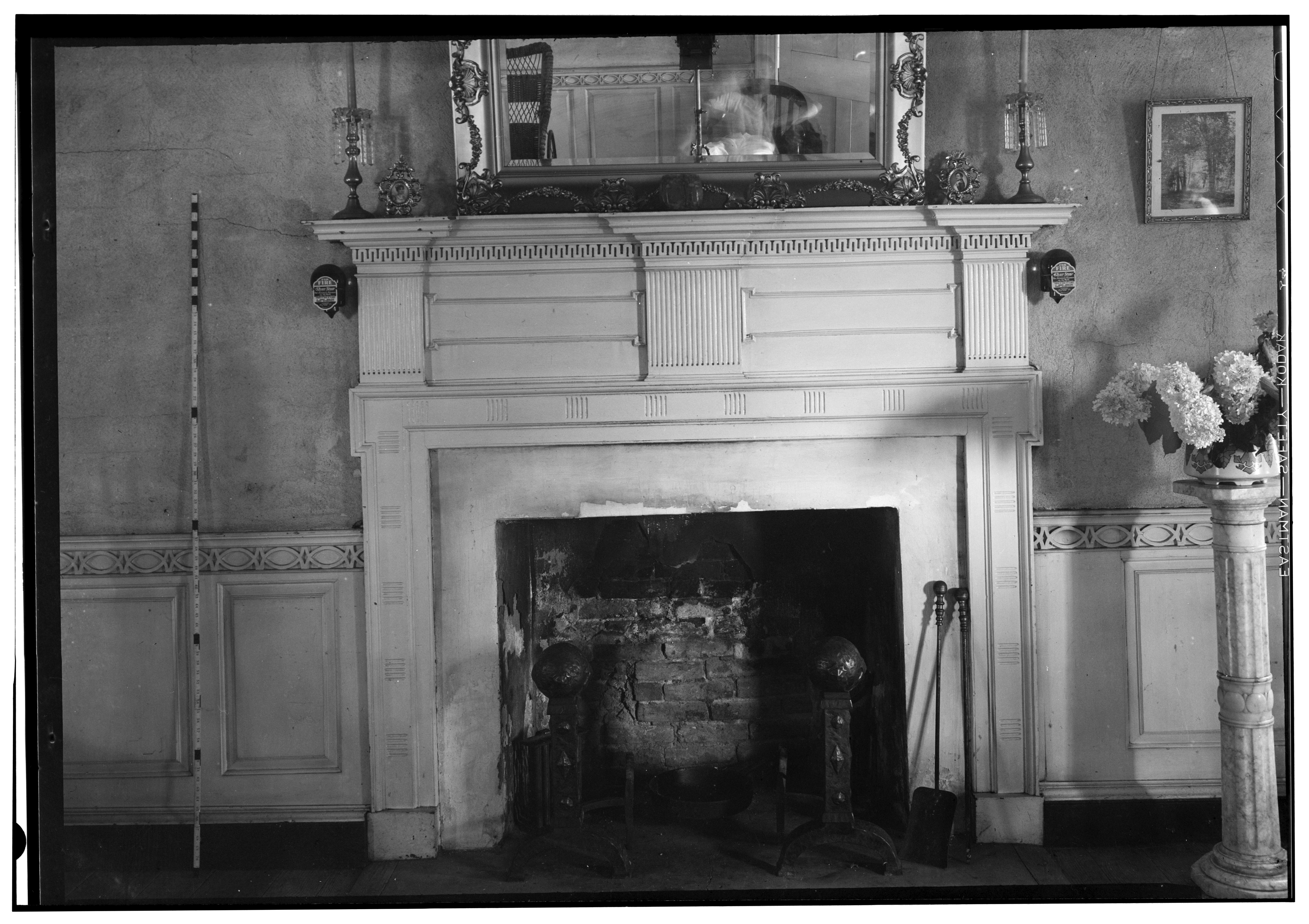
Interior mantelpiece

== See also ==
- Historic houses in Virginia
