= Rosalie Stier Calvert =

American plantation owner and correspondent

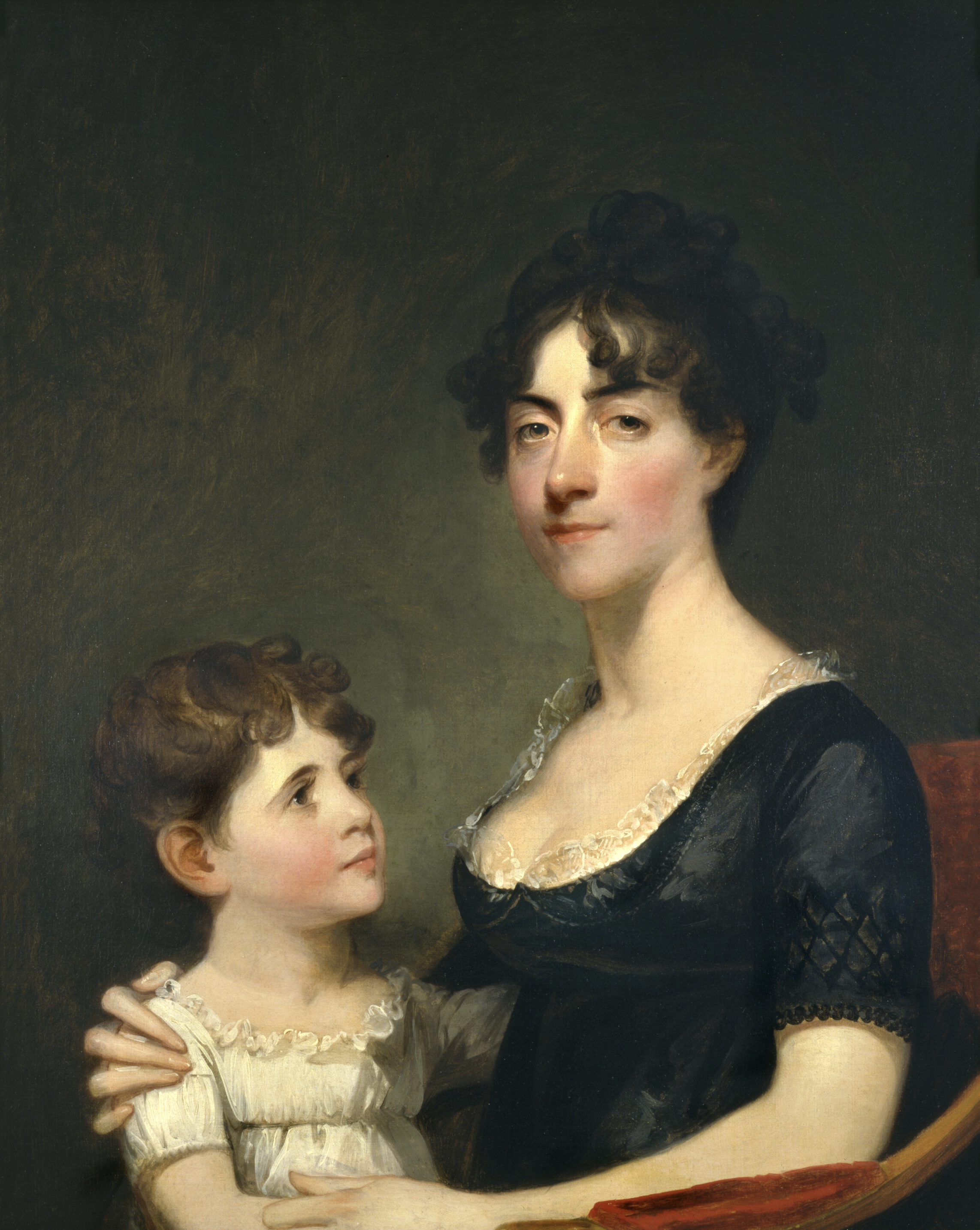
- Portrait of Calvert and her eldest daughter Caroline Maria by Gilbert Stuart, c. 1805
- Born: Rosalie-Eugénie Stier; February 16, 1778; Antwerp, the Low Countries
- Died: March 13, 1821 (aged 43); Riverdale Park, Maryland, US
- Spouse: George Calvert (1768–1838)
- Children: 9, including: George Henry Calvert; Charles Benedict Calvert

Rosalie-Eugénie Stier Calvert (February 16, 1778 – March 13, 1821) was a plantation owner and correspondent in nineteenth century Maryland. A collection of her letters, titled Mistress of Riversdale, The Plantation Letters of Rosalie Stier Calvert, was published by the Johns Hopkins University Press in 1991. The letters range in date from 1795 to 1821, and illuminate the life of Calvert's plantation household, including the events leading up to and during the War of 1812.

== Early life ==
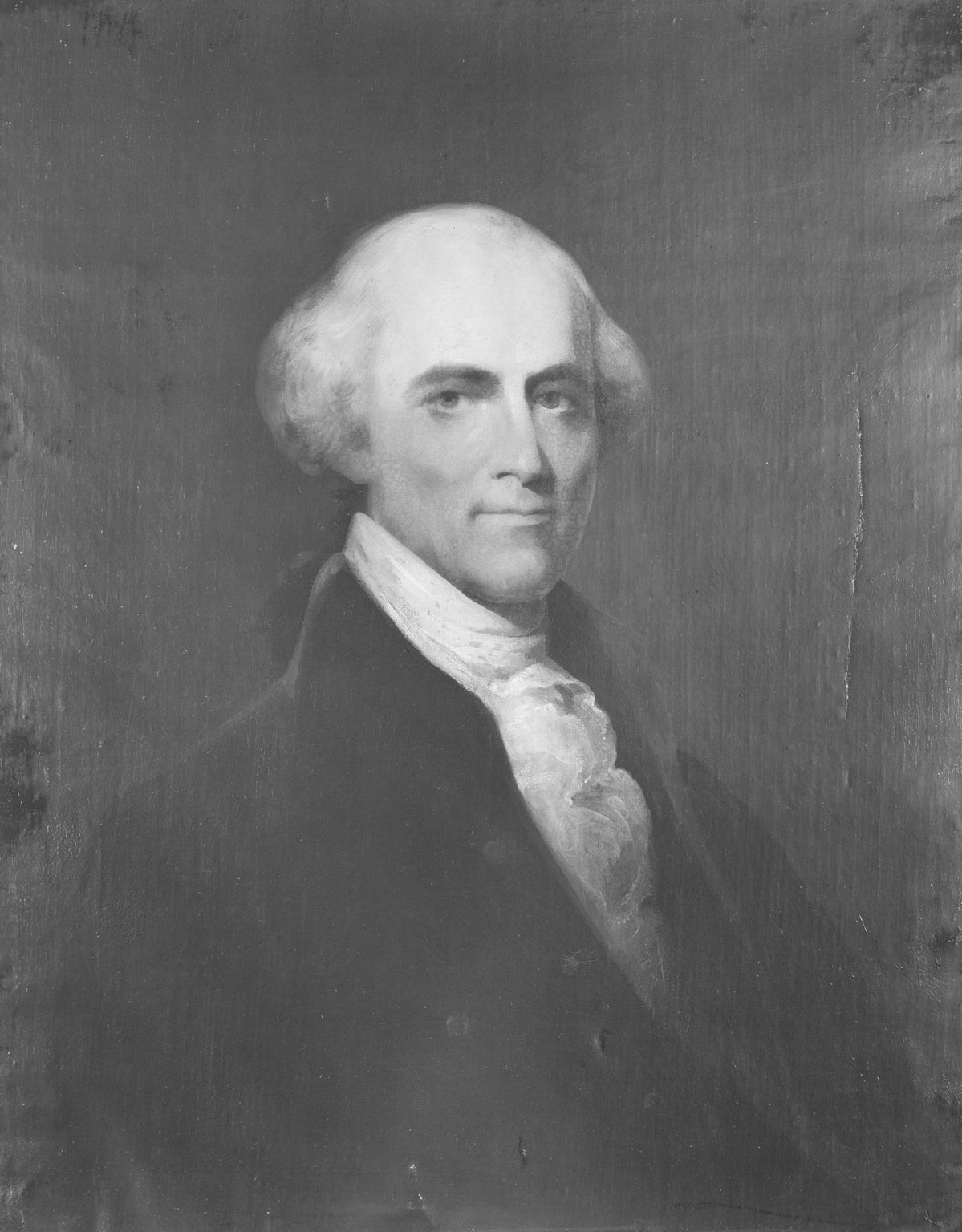
Henri Joseph Stier, 1743–1821

Rosalie-Eugénie Stier was the daughter of a wealthy Antwerp burgher, Henri-Joseph Stier (1743–1821) and his wife Marie-Louise Peeters. The Stier family fled the Low Countries in 1794 as a French army invaded their home city. Once in America, the family's fortunes recovered from the disasters of European war. Rosalie Calvert became one of the richest women in America, amassing a large fortune, much of which she managed herself, and she owned one of the largest art collections in the country.

== Riversdale ==
Rosalie Calvert lived at the Riversdale plantation, a five-part, large-scale late Georgian mansion with superior Federal interior, built between 1801 and 1807. Also known as Baltimore House, Calvert Mansion or Riversdale Mansion, it is located at 4811 Riverdale Road in Riverdale Park, Maryland. It was designated a National Historic Landmark in 1997.

Once the manor house and centerpiece of a 739-acre (2.99 km^{2}) plantation, Riversdale was built in 1801 by Henri Joseph Stier, who lived in the Brice House in Annapolis, Maryland immediately prior to building Riversdale. Stier planned the house in 1801 to resemble his Belgian residence, the Chateau du Mick. Four years later, Stier returned to the Low Countries, leaving the unfinished Riversdale to be completed by his daughter, Rosalie Stier Calvert and her husband, George Calvert, the son of Benedict Swingate Calvert, who was a natural son of Charles Calvert, 5th Baron Baltimore.

== Family life ==
Rosalie and George Calvert had a large family, though four of their children died in infancy or in childhood. Their son Charles Benedict Calvert established the Maryland Agricultural College, now the University of Maryland, College Park, on part of the Riversdale property. Another son, George Henry Calvert (January 2, 1803 – May 24, 1889) was a noted editor, essayist, dramatist, poet, and biographer.

- Caroline Maria Calvert (1800–1842), married on June 19, 1823, Thomas Willing Morris of Philadelphia.
- George Henry Calvert (1803–1889), essayist, dramatist, poet, and biographer.
- Marie Louise Calvert (1804–1809), died in childhood.
- Rosalie Eugenia Calvert (1806–1845), married Charles Henry Carter (1804–1892).
- Charles Benedict Calvert (1808–1864), was a U.S. Congressman who founded what is now the University of Maryland, College Park, chartered in 1856.
- Henry Joseph Albert Calvert (1810–1820), died in childhood.
- Marie Louise Calvert (1812–1813), died in infancy.
- Julia Calvert (1814–1888), married Richard Henry Stuart (1808–1889).
- Amelia Isabella Calvert (1817–1820), died in childhood.

Rosalie lost a number of children through miscarriages and stillbirths:

- A stillborn son (1801)
- A stillborn daughter (1802)
- A miscarried daughter (1805)
- A miscarried daughter (1807)
- A miscarried son (1809)
- A miscarried son (1811)
- A stillborn daughter (1813)
- A stillborn daughter (1815)
- A stillborn daughter (1816)
- A stillborn son (1818)

== Washington/Custis relations ==
The Calverts were related, through the marriage of George Calvert's sister, to George and Martha Washington. George Calvert's sister, Eleanor Calvert, married Martha Washington's son, John Parke Custis, who was born in 1754 to Martha and her first husband Daniel Parke Custis. John Parke Custis and Eleanor Calvert Custis had four children before his death: Elizabeth Parke Custis (1776), Martha Parke Custis (1777), Eleanor Parke Custis (1779), and George Washington Parke Custis (1781). Rosalie Calvert and George Calvert were thus aunt and uncle to Martha and George Washington's four Custis grandchildren.

Rosalie was close to her Custis nieces whom she referred to by their married names Mrs. Law, Mrs. Peter and Mrs. Lewis, and she spent a lot of time with Eliza Law, who once lived at Riversdale for almost a year. Rosalie kept her Belgian relatives informed about Eliza Law's controversial separation and divorce from her husband, Thomas Law. In her letters to her family in Belgium, Rosalie reported that George Washington Parke Custis was building Arlington House, a mansion "that will be seen from all points of Washington," and she also informed them of his marriage to Mary Lee Fitzhugh in 1804. When Rosalie Calvert died in 1821, her niece Eleanor Lewis wrote that "I loved her as much as any connection I possessed."

== Death and legacy ==
She died on March 13, 1821, according to her physician, "of a general dropsy affecting the whole system", and is buried in a family cemetery north of the mansion.

Rosalie Calvert was an indefatigable correspondent. A collection of her letters, titled Mistress of Riversdale, The Plantation Letters of Rosalie Stier Calvert, was published by the Johns Hopkins University Press in 1991, edited by Margaret Law Callcott. The letters range in date from 1795 to 1821, and illuminate the life of Stier's plantation household during the events leading up to and during the War of 1812.

== Gallery ==
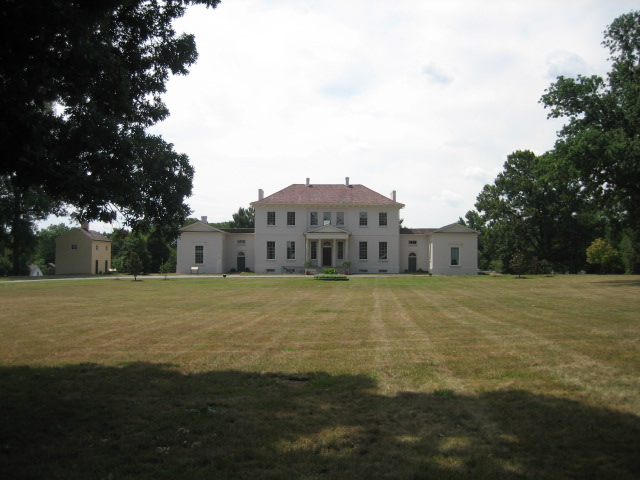
Riversdale, July 2007

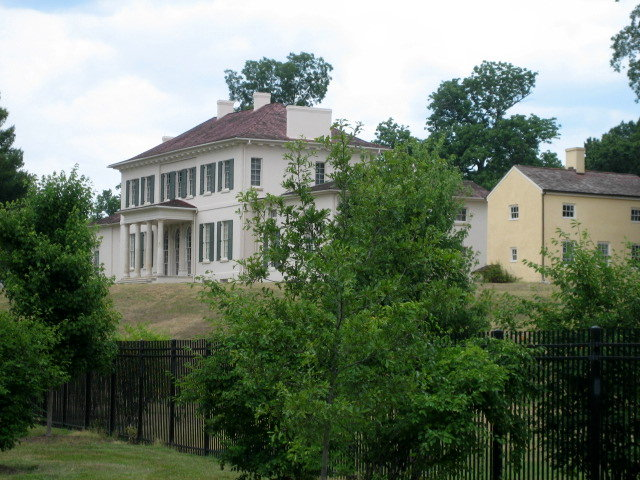
Riversdale Manor in July 2007

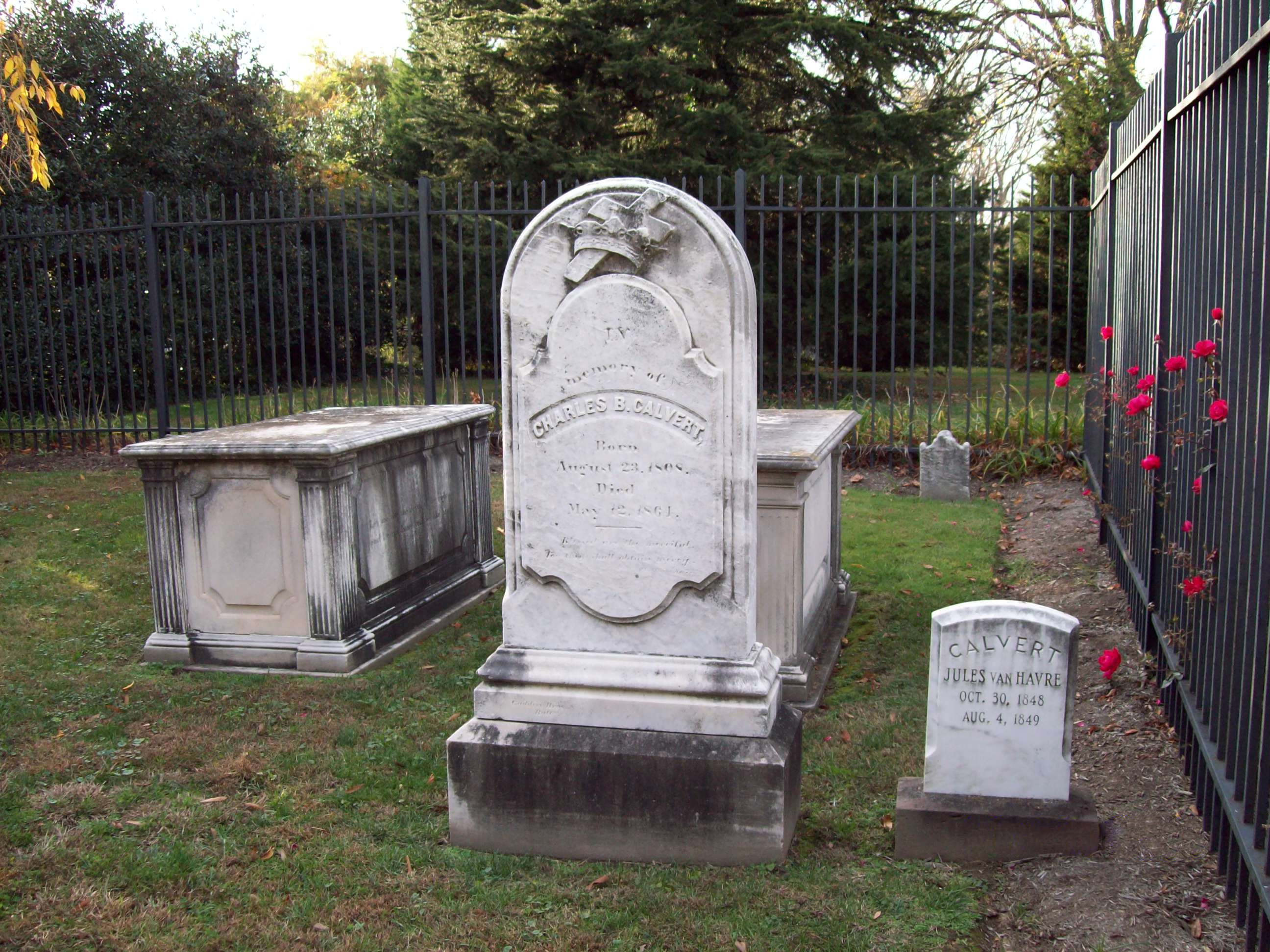
Calvert Family Cemetery in November 2008

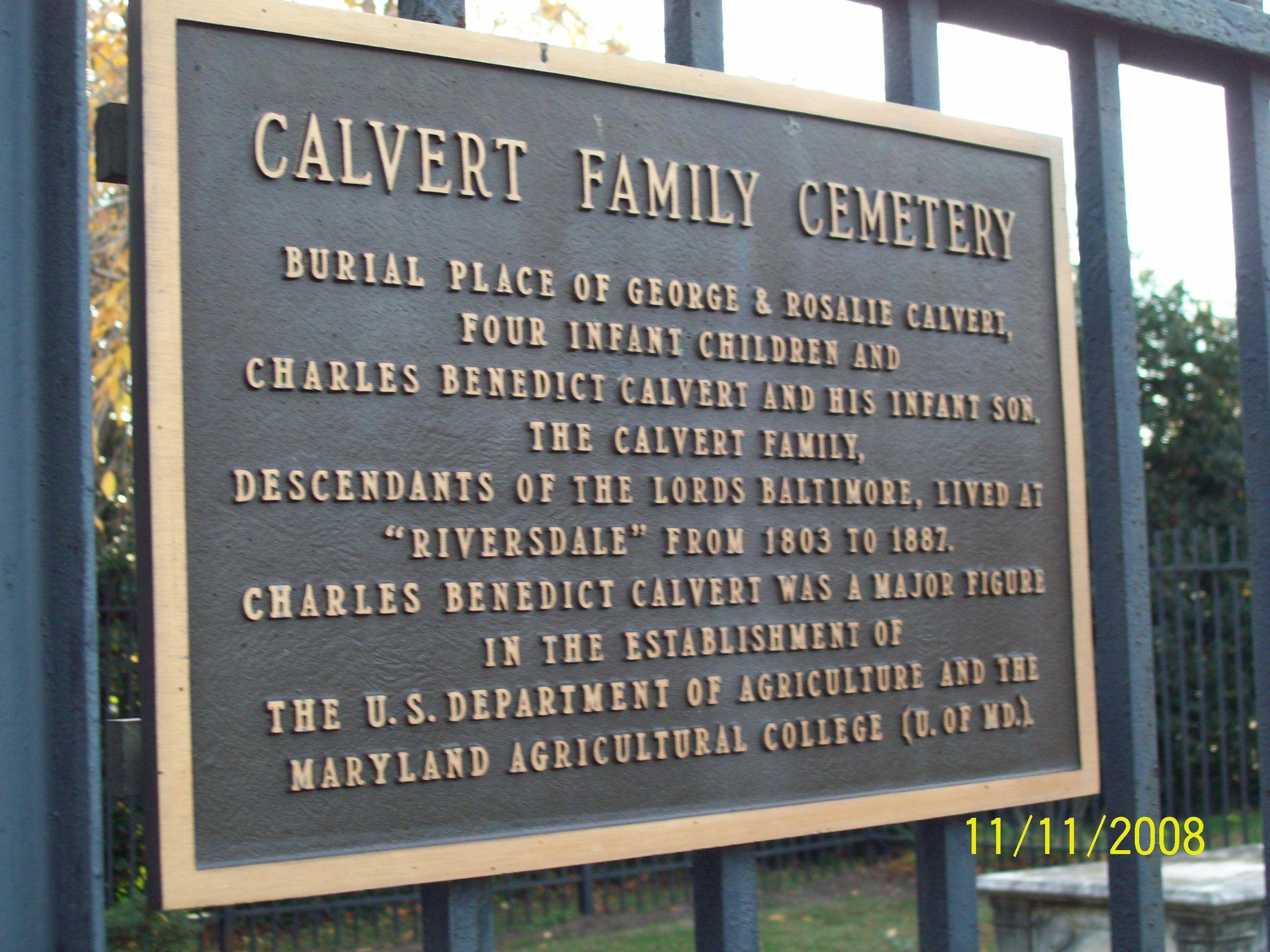
Plaque Commemorating the Calvert Family Cemetery in November 2008
