= Charles Benedict Calvert =

American politician (1808-1864)

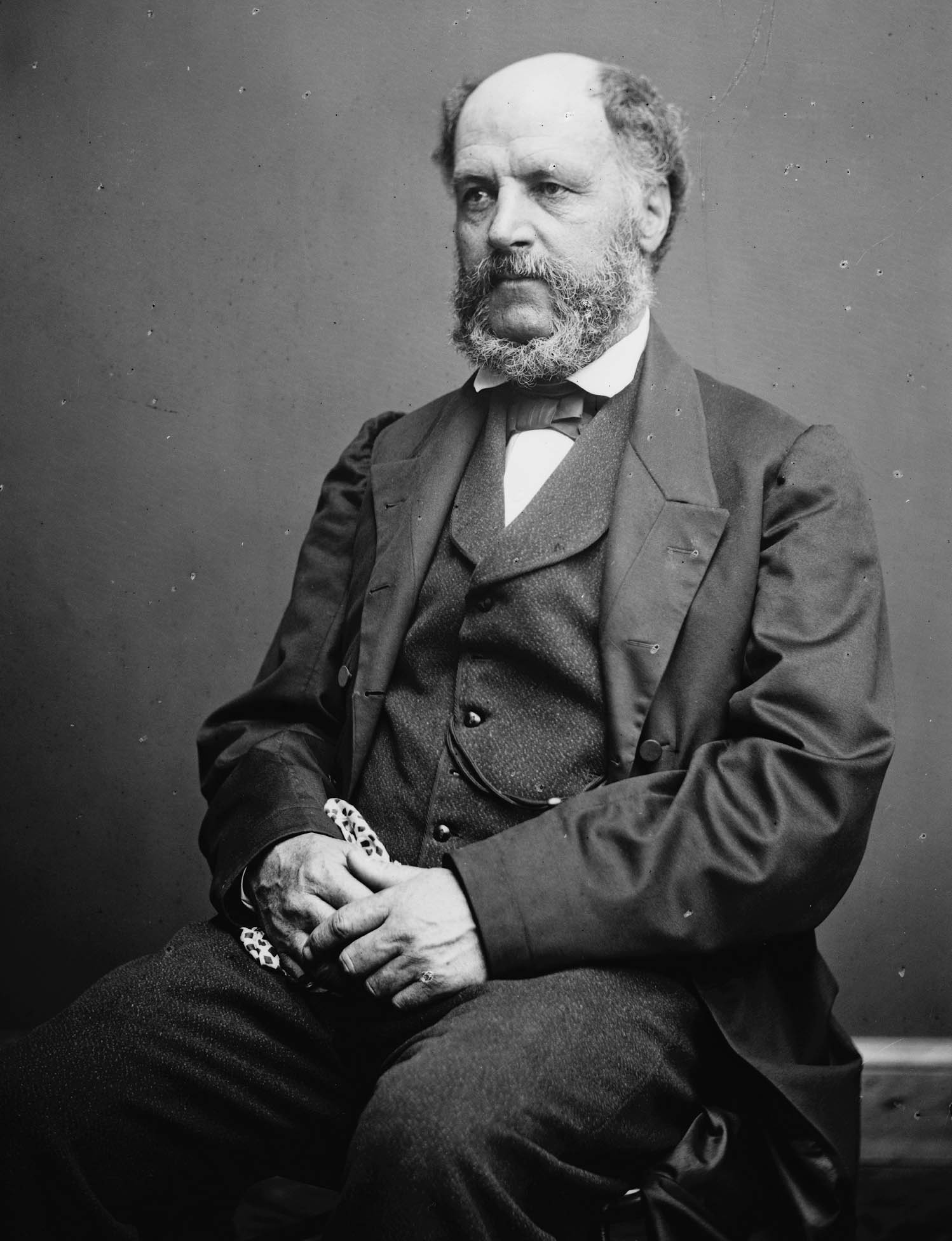
- Calvert, c. 1860–1864

Member of the U.S. House of Representatives from Maryland's 6th district
- In office March 4, 1861 – March 3, 1863
- Preceded by: George Wurtz Hughes
- Succeeded by: District abolished

Member of the Maryland House of Delegates
- In office 1839–1846

Personal details
- Born: August 23, 1808 Riversdale, Maryland, U.S.
- Died: May 12, 1864 (aged 55) Riverdale Park, Maryland, U.S.
- Resting place: Calvert Cemetery
- Party: Democratic (1839–1860); Union (1861–1863)
- Children: 6, including Charles
- Parent(s): George Calvert; Rosalie Stier Calvert
- Education: University of Virginia
- Profession: Businessman, landowner

Charles Benedict Calvert (August 23, 1808 – May 12, 1864) was an American politician who was a U.S. representative from the sixth district of Maryland, serving one term from 1861 to 1863. He was an early backer of the inventors of the telegraph, and in 1856 he founded the Maryland Agricultural College, the first agricultural research college in America, now known as the University of Maryland. He was a direct descendant of the Lords Baltimore, proprietary governors of the Province of Maryland from 1631 until 1776.

== Early life ==
Calvert was born on August 23, 1808, at his family's estate at Riversdale, Maryland. His mother was Rosalie-Eugénie Stier (1778–1821), the daughter of a wealthy Flemish aristocrat, Baron Henri-Joseph Stier (1743–1821) and his wife Marie-Louise Peeters. The Stiers, descendants of Flemish painter Pieter Paul Rubens, had fled to America in the late eighteenth century as French Republican armies occupied their hometown of Antwerp. Calvert's father, the wealthy planter George Calvert (1768–1838), was the son of the Loyalist politician Benedict Swingate Calvert (c.1730–1788) – a natural son of the penultimate Proprietary Governor of Maryland, Charles Calvert, 5th Baron Baltimore – and Benedict's wife Elizabeth Calvert (1731–1788).

== Education ==
Calvert completed his preparatory studies at Bladensburg Academy of Maryland. Later, he received a certificate of completion from the University of Virginia at Charlottesville in 1827, even though he attended the university spuriously, and engaged in agricultural pursuits and stock breeding.

== Science and agriculture ==
Calvert inherited a plantation from his family, called Riverdale. He "introduced scientific agriculture to the plantation, adopted ideas published in journals and newspapers, exhibited at county and state fairs, and introduced a number of his own innovations. He could implement these innovations because of the large number of slaves – as many as 55 in 1850 – at his command."

Calvert was a strong backer of the inventors of the telegraph, Samuel Morse and Alfred Vail. On April 9, 1844, Morse and Vail successfully tested their device by transmitting a message from the nation's capital to the Calvert home, Riversdale. This test came 45 days before the more celebrated event when Morse sent the message "What hath God wrought?" from Washington to Baltimore, along telegraph lines that ran above the Baltimore and Ohio Railroad line near Riversdale.

Calvert became president of the Prince George's County, Maryland Agricultural Society and the Maryland State Agricultural Society, and served as vice president of the United States Pomological Society. He founded the first agricultural research college in America (later known as the Maryland Agricultural College at College Park, and currently known as the University of Maryland, College Park), which was chartered in 1856. Calvert was also one of the early advocates for the establishment of the United States Department of Agriculture.

== Politics ==
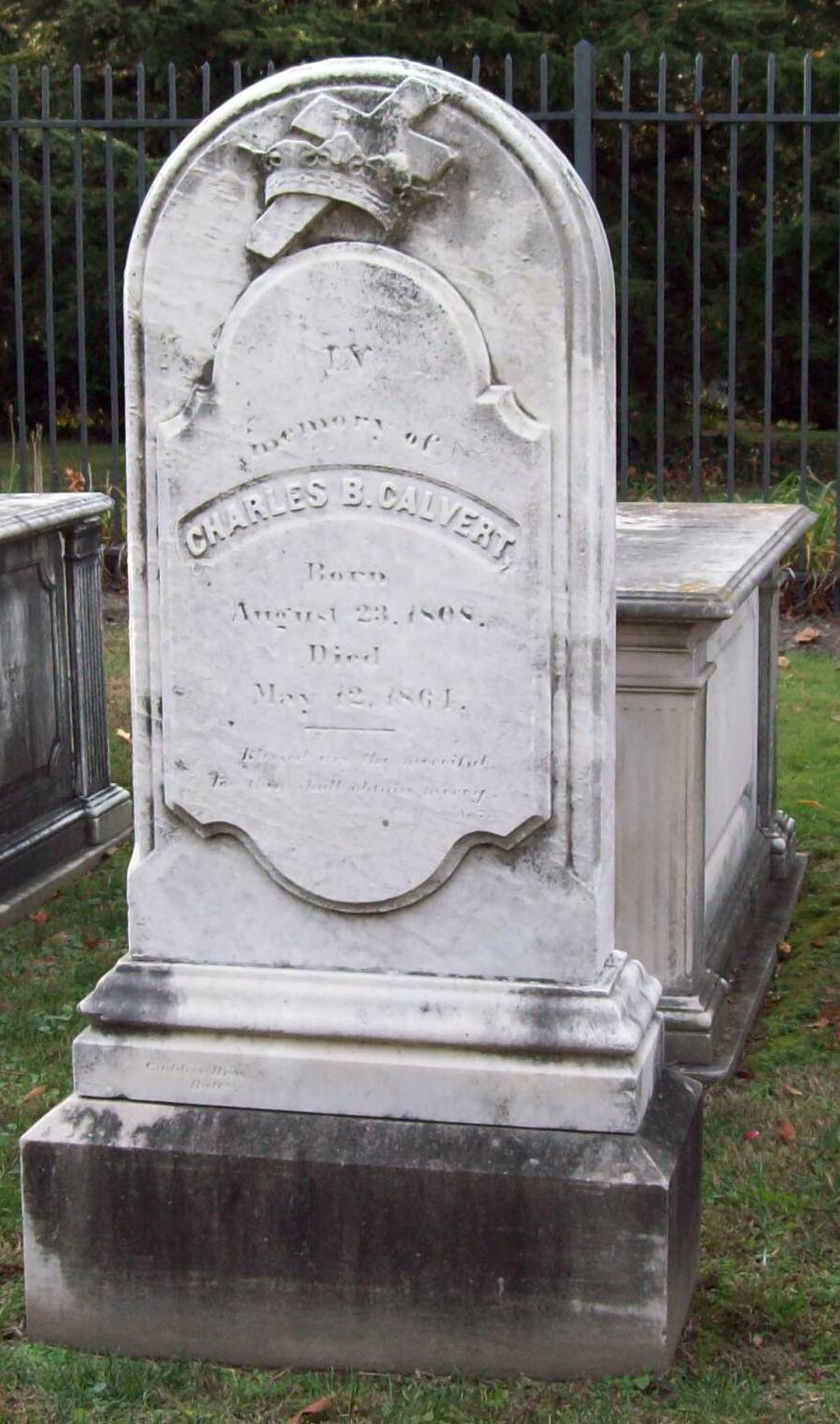
Grave of Calvert at Calvert Cemetery

Calvert served as a member of the Maryland House of Delegates in 1839, 1843, and 1844. The outbreak of the American Civil War provided an opportunity for Calvert to enter national politics as an opponent of secession. In 1861, he was elected as an Unionist to the 37th United States Congress representing Maryland's 6th congressional district. The issuance of the Emancipation Proclamation divided Maryland's unionists. As a candidate for reelection in 1863, Calvert identified himself with the conservative element of the Union Party and castigated the radical Union League candidates; he was defeated in a three-way race against Benjamin G. Harris, the victorious Democrat, and John C. Holland, the Unconditional Unionist. After leaving office, he resumed agricultural pursuits until his death on May 12, 1864, at Riversdale, and is interred in Calvert Cemetery.

== Marriage and issue ==
He married in Baltimore on June 6, 1839 Charlotte Augusta Norris (Baltimore, March 11, 1816 - December 7, 1876), and had six children; through one of his sons and one of his paternal grandsons descend, though through an illegitimate ancestor, the last patrilineal Calverts in both Great-Britain and Ireland and the United States of America:

- Ella Calvert (Baltimore, March 20, 1840 - Washington, February 17, 1902), married on September 3, 1861 Duncan George Campbell, and had issue
- George Henry Calvert II, of Washington, D.C. (Riversdale, November 29, 1841 - Washington, 1919), married on December 26, 1872 Frances Seybolt, and had issue
- Charles Baltimore Calvert, of Maryland (Riversdale, February 5, 1843 - McAlpine, College Park, August 31, 1906), married in Baltimore on June 14, 1866 Eleanor Mackubin (August 18, 1840 - April 30, 1932), and had issue
- William Norris Calvert (October 12, 1845 - September 7, 1889), married on March 12, 1888 Laura Mathilda Hunt (August 31, 1855 - March 13, 1921), and had female issue
- Eugene Stier Calvert (December 19, 1846 - November 30, 1894), unmarried and without issue
- Jules van Havre Calvert (October 30, 1848 - August 4, 1849)

== Sources ==
- United States Congress. "Charles Benedict Calvert (id: C000058)". Biographical Directory of the United States Congress.. Retrieved 2009-03-31

Academic offices
Preceded by Benjamin Hallowell	President of the Maryland Agricultural College; 1860 (acting)	Succeeded by John Work Scott
U.S. House of Representatives
Preceded by George Wurtz Hughes	Member of the U.S. House of Representatives from Maryland's 6th congressional district March 4, 1861 – March 3, 1863	Succeeded by seat abolished
