= Onorio =

Onorio is an Italian male given name. Notable people with this name include:

- Onorio Longhi (1568–1619), Italian architect
- Onorio Marinari (1627–1715), Italian painter
- Onorio Razzolini (1699–1769), Italian settler
- Onorio Ruotolo (1888–1966), Italian sculptor and poet
- Onorio de Verme (1588–1637), Italian bishop

== As surname ==
- Rota Onorio (1919–2004), I-Kiribati politician
- Teima Onorio (born 1963), I-Kiribati politician
