= George Calvert (planter) =

Plantation owner in Maryland (1768–1838)

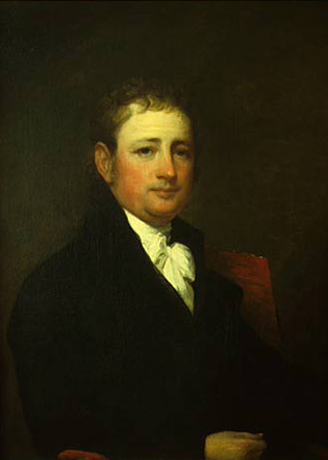
- Born: February 2, 1768; Mount Airy, Maryland
- Died: January 28, 1838 (aged 69); Riverdale Park, Maryland
- Spouse: Rosalie Stier Calvert
- Children: 9, including: George Henry Calvert; Charles Benedict Calvert
- Parent(s): Benedict Swingate Calvert; Elizabeth Calvert

George Calvert (February 2, 1768 – January 28, 1838) was an American planter active in late eighteenth- and early nineteenth-century Maryland. His plantation house, Riversdale plantation, also known as the Calvert Mansion, is a five-part, large-scale late Georgian mansion with superior Federal interior, built between 1801 and 1807, and was designated a National Historic Landmark in 1997. Calvert's wife, the Belgian-born heiress Rosalie Stier Calvert, was an indefatigable correspondent whose letters, titled Mistress of Riversdale, The Plantation Letters of Rosalie Stier Calvert, was published by the Johns Hopkins University Press in 1991. The letters range in date from 1795 to 1821, and illuminate the life of the Calverts' plantation household during the events leading up to and during the War of 1812.

== Early life ==
Arms of the Barons Baltimore

George Calvert was born at his father's plantation home of Mount Airy, Maryland, on February 2, 1768, the youngest son of Benedict Swingate Calvert, who was himself the illegitimate son of Charles Calvert, 5th Baron Baltimore, the penultimate Lord Proprietor of the Province of Maryland.

=== Riversdale ===
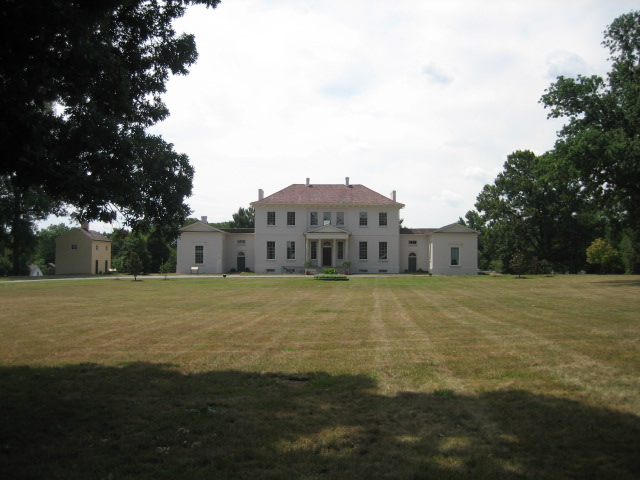
George Calvert lived at Riversdale plantation, now a National Historic Landmark.

George Calvert lived at the Riversdale plantation, also known as the Calvert Mansion, a five-part, large-scale late Georgian mansion with superior Federal interior, built between 1801 and 1807. Also known as Baltimore House, Calvert Mansion or Riversdale Mansion, it is located at 4811 Riverdale Road in Riverdale Park, Maryland. It was designated a National Historic Landmark in 1997.

Once the manor house and centerpiece of a 739-acre (2.99 km^{2}) plantation, Riversdale was built for Belgian émigré Henri Joseph Stier, Baron de Stier, who lived in the Brice House in Annapolis, Maryland, immediately prior to building Riversdale. Stier planned the house in 1801 to resemble his Belgian residence, the Chateau du Mick. Four years later, Stier returned to Belgium, leaving the unfinished Riversdale to be completed by his daughter, Rosalie Stier Calvert and her husband George.

The number of people enslaved at Riversdale varied from around fifteen in 1800 to thirty-two, as reported in the 1806 tax assessment.

== Family life ==
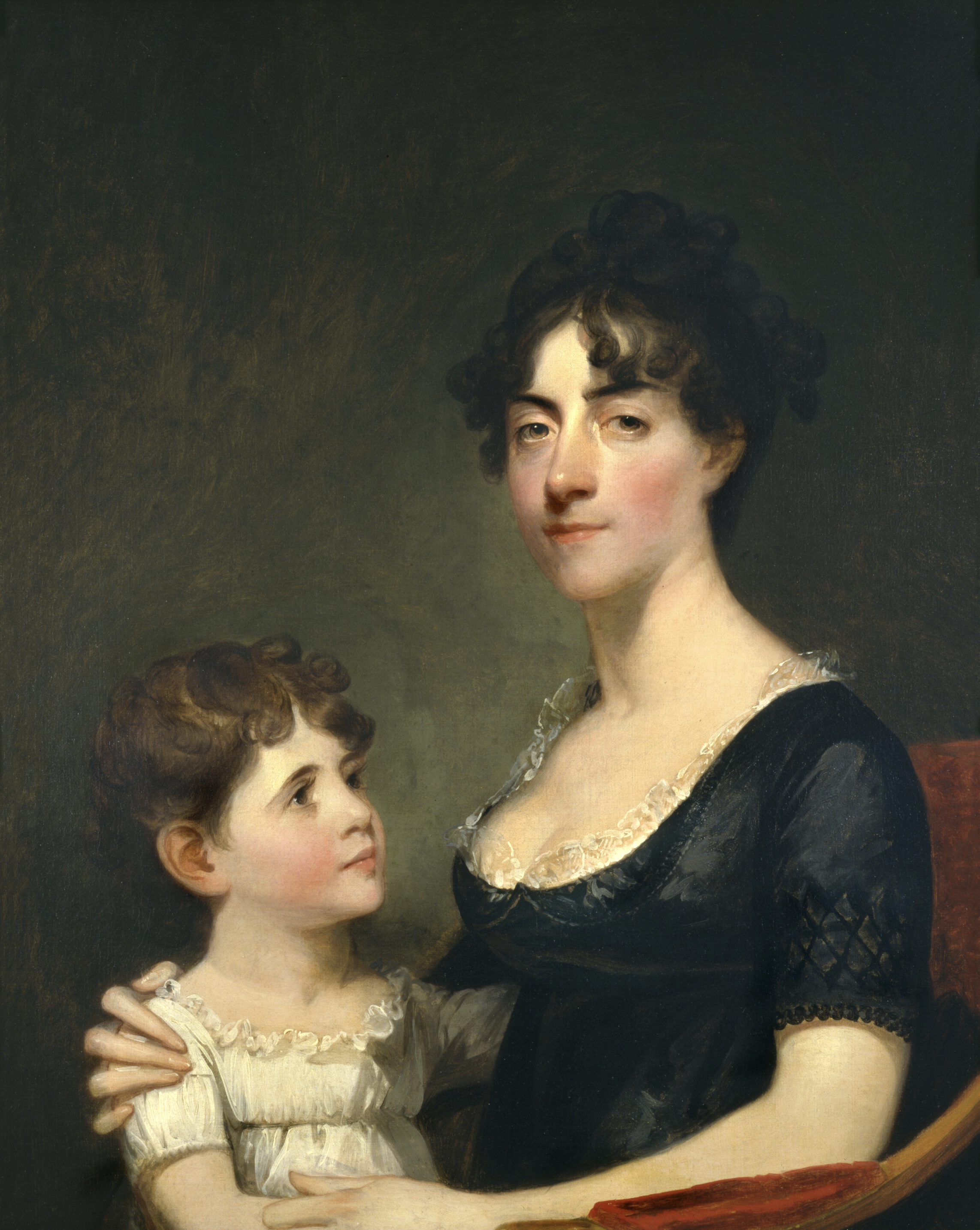
Calvert's wife, Rosalie Stier Calvert and their eldest daughter Carolina Maria, painted by Gilbert Stuart in 1805.

George and Rosalie Calvert were married on June 11, 1799. The couple had a large family. Their son Charles Benedict Calvert established the Maryland Agricultural College, now the University of Maryland, College Park, on part of the Riversdale property. Another son, George Henry Calvert (January 2, 1803 – May 24, 1889) was a noted editor, essayist, dramatist, poet, and biographer. Other children include:

- Caroline Maria Calvert
- George Henry Calvert – essayist, dramatist, poet, and biographer.
- Marie Louise Calvert
- Rosalie Eugenia Calvert, married a nephew of Robert E. Lee, and moved to Goodwood (Upper Marlboro, Maryland), which her father built in 1799.
- Charles Benedict Calvert – U.S. Congressman who founded what is now the University of Maryland, College Park, chartered in 1856.
- Henry Joseph Albert Calvert
- Marie Louise Calvert
- Julia Calvert
- Amelia Isabella Calvert

Rosalie herself died on March 13, 1821, according to her physician, "of a general dropsy affecting the whole system", at the relatively young age of 43.

== Politics ==
In 1816 Calvert was approached by Maryland Federalists who asked him to run as the Federalist candidate for Governor of Maryland. Calvert came from a long line of politicians; his ancestors had ruled the Province of Maryland. However, pressed by his wife Rosalie to avoid politics, he was persuaded to devote his energies instead to the economic well-being of his family. However, it seems he may have missed an opportunity, as the Federalist candidate chosen in his place, Charles Carnan Ridgely was duly elected that year.

== Founding of the Washington Jockey Club ==
In 1802 the Club sought a new sight for the tract, as the current one that lay the rear of what is now the site of Decatur House at H Street and Jackson Place, crossing Seventeenth Street and Pennsylvania Avenue to Twentieth Street-today the Eisenhower Executive Office Building-was being overtaken be the growth of the Federal City. With the leadership of John Tayloe III and Charles Carnan Ridgely and support of Gen. John Peter Van Ness, Dr. William Thornton, G.W. P. Custis, John D. Threlkeld of Georgetown and George Calvert of Riversdale, Bladensburg, Maryland, the contests were moved to Meridian Hill, south of Columbia Road between Fourteenth and Sixteenth Streets, and were conducted at the Holmstead Farm's one mile oval track.

== Gallery ==
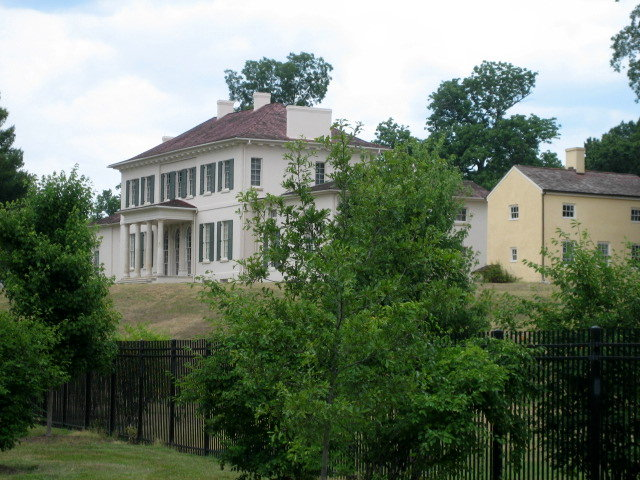
Riversdale Manor in July 2007

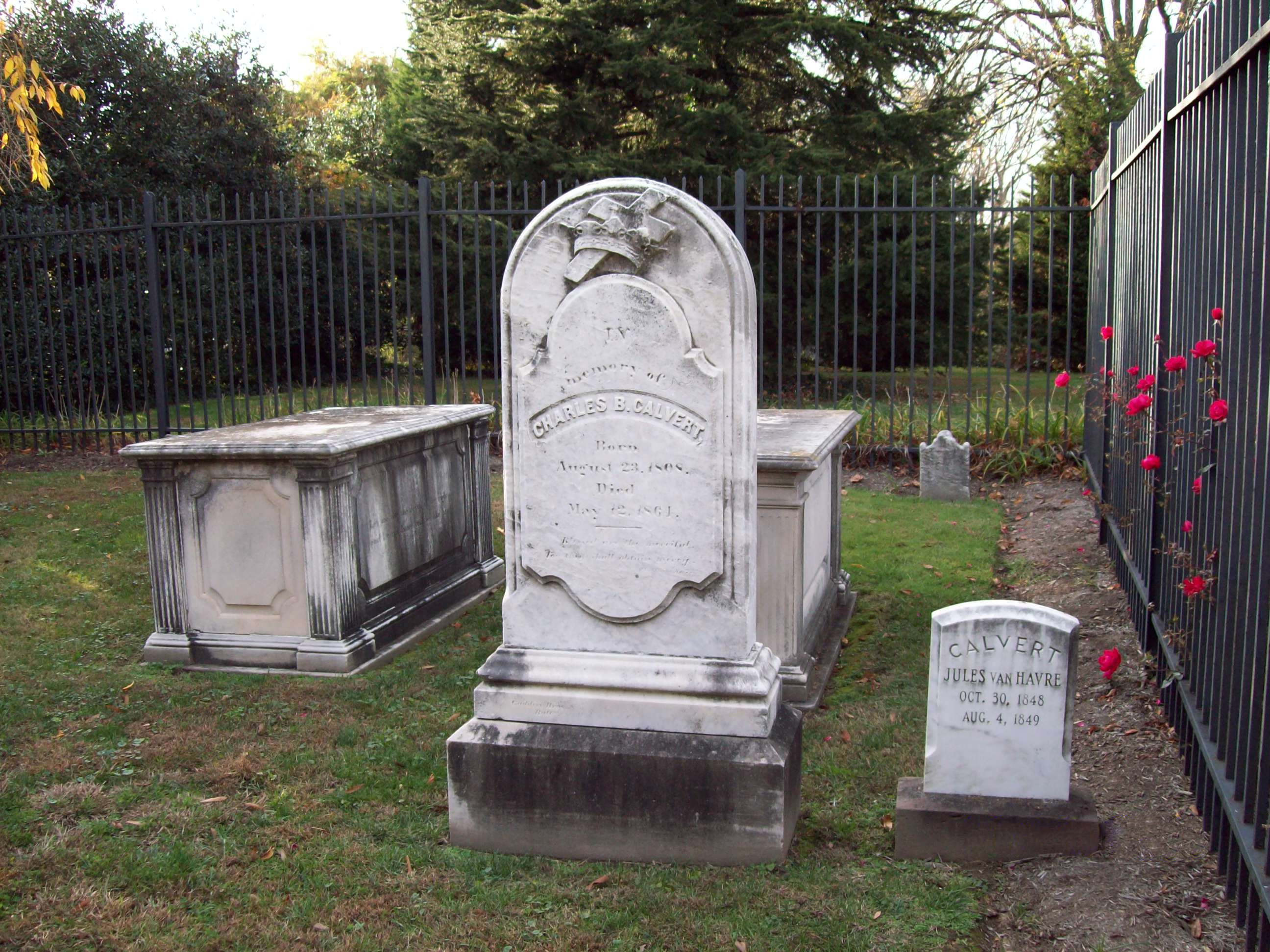
Calvert Family Cemetery in November 2008

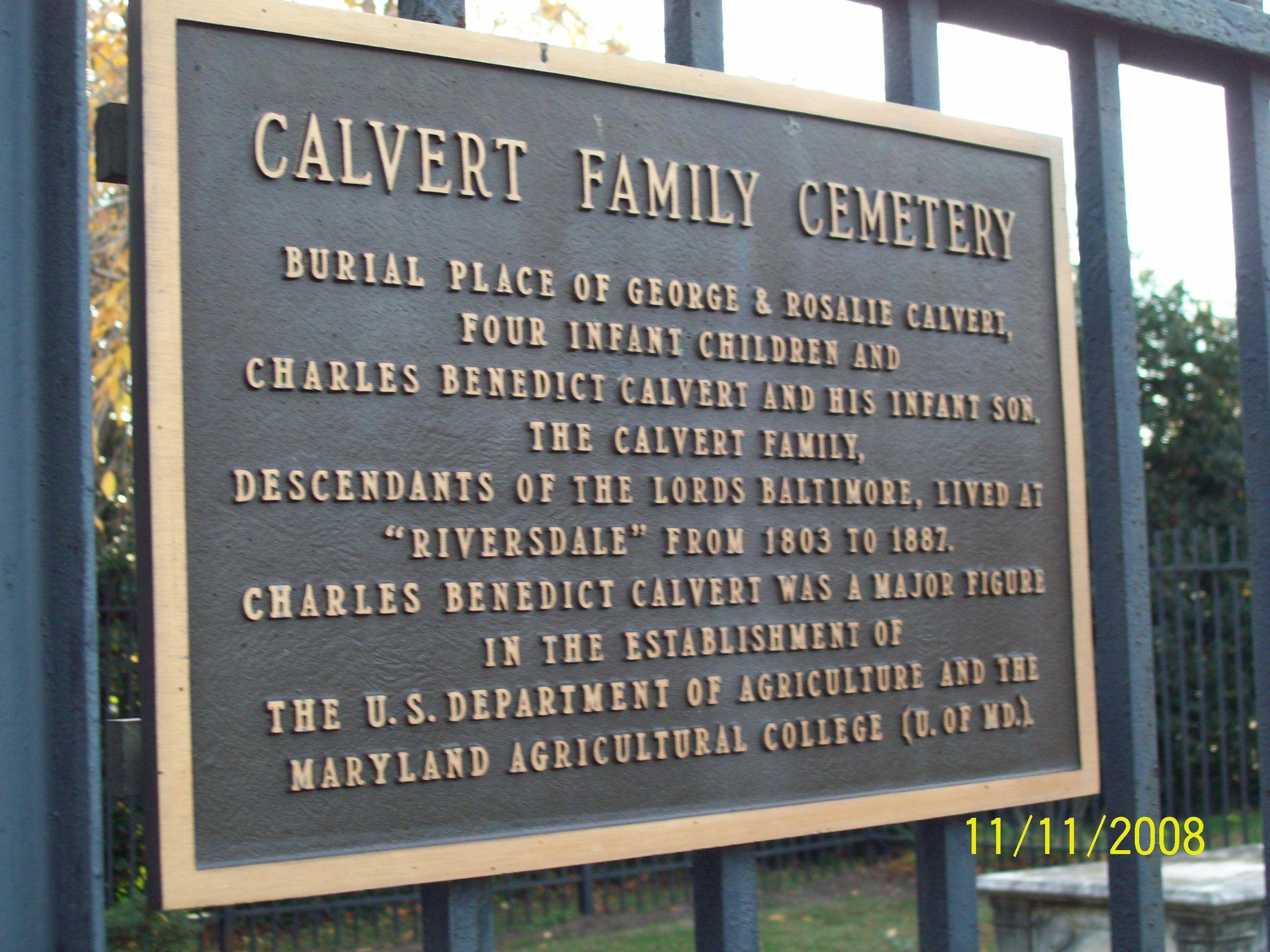
Plaque Commemorating the Calvert Family Cemetery in November 2008
