= George Henry Calvert =

American poet

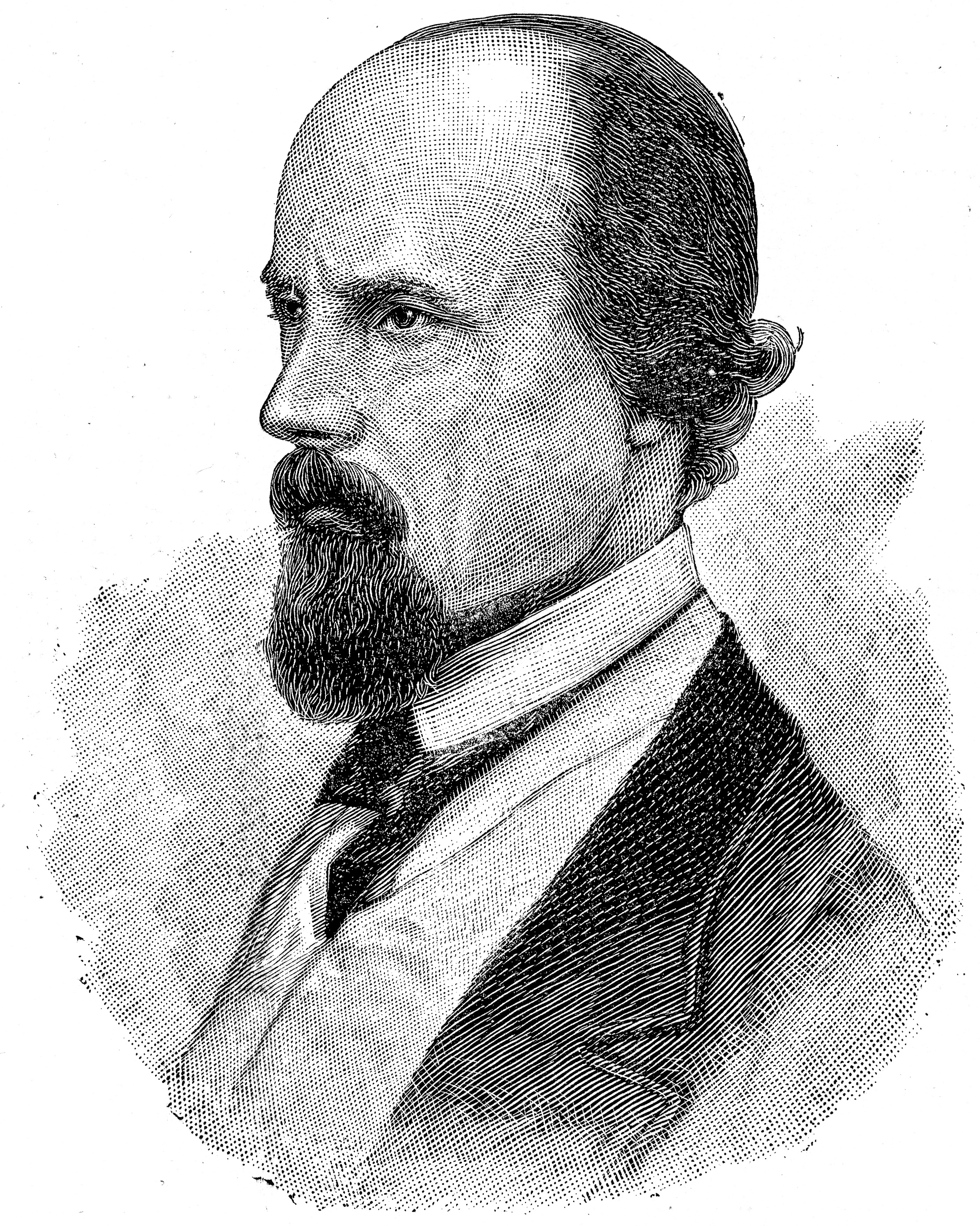

2nd Mayor of Newport, Rhode Island
- In office October 1853 – June 1854
- Preceded by: Robert B. Cranston
- Succeeded by: William C. Cozzens

Personal details
- Born: January 2, 1803 Prince George's County, Maryland
- Died: May 24, 1889 (aged 86)
- Resting place: Island Cemetery, Newport
- Spouse: Elizabeth Steuart
- Parent(s): George Calvert; Rosalie Stier Calvert
- Education: Harvard College

George Henry Calvert (January 2, 1803 – May 24, 1889) was an American editor, essayist, dramatist, poet, and biographer. He was the Chair of Moral Philosophy at the newly established College of Arts and Sciences at the University of Baltimore, and in 1854 he served as Mayor of Newport, Rhode Island.

== Biography ==
Calvert was born January 2, 1803, in Prince George County, Maryland. His mother, Rosalie Eugenia Stier (1778–1821), was the daughter of a wealthy Belgian aristocrat, Baron Henri Joseph Stier (1743–1821) and his wife Marie Louise Peeters. His father, George Calvert (1768–1838), was the son of Benedict Swingate Calvert – a natural son of Charles Calvert, 5th Baron Baltimore – and his wife Elizabeth Calvert (1731–1788).

George Calvert was the Calverts' eldest son. He grew up in Maryland, graduated from Harvard College in 1823, and studied in Germany where in March 1825 he met the poet Goethe. Returning to Baltimore, he edited the Baltimore American. In 1840 he made another trip to Europe, meeting William Wordsworth. In 1843, Calvert moved to Newport, Rhode Island.

== Marriage ==
On May 11, 1829, George Calvert married Elizabeth Steuart (1802–1897). His father was opposed to the match on the grounds that Elizabeth, the daughter of Baltimore physician James Steuart, had little property to her name. However a compromise was eventually reached and, after a suitable delay, the couple were married at the Steuart house in West Baltimore, Maryland Square.

George and Elizabeth had no children.

== Academia and politics ==
In 1830, Calvert was appointed the Chair of Moral Philosophy at the newly established College of Arts and Sciences at the University of Baltimore.

In 1853, Calvert was elected Mayor of Newport, Rhode Island, and served a term from October 1853 to June 1854.

== Works ==
- "Cabiro," a poem in the stanza of "Don Juan," of which two cantos were published in 1840, and two more in 1864
- Scenes and Thoughts in Europe, New York: Wiley & Putnam, 1846
- Poems, Boston: William D. Ticknor & Co., 1847
- Introduction to Social Science: A Discourse in Three Parts, New York: Redfield, 1856
- Comedies (1856)
- The Gentleman, Boston: E.P. Dutton and Company, New York: Hurd and Houghton, 1866
- Anyta and other Poems (1863)
- First Years in Europe (1867)
- Ellen, a Poem (1869)
- Goethe, his Life and Works (1872)
- Essays Aesthetical, Boston: Lee and Shepard, 1875, New York: Lee, Shepard, and Dillingham, 1875
- Arnold and Andre. An Historical Drama, New York: Lee and Shepard, 1876

He translated and published in 1845 a portion of the correspondence between Goethe and Schiller.

In 1866 he also translated and had published Some of the "Thoughts" of Joseph Joubert.
