= Charles Baltimore Calvert =

American politician (1848–1906)

Member of the Maryland House of Delegates
- In office 1865–1867

Personal details
- Born: February 5, 1848
- Died: August 31, 1906 (aged 58)
- Resting place: Rock Creek Cemetery
- Party: Democratic
- Parent(s): Charles Benedict Calvert; Charlotte Augusta Norris
- Nickname: C. B. Calvert Jr. (Note: Despite having a different middle name from his father, newspapers still referred to him as junior.)

Charles Baltimore Calvert (February 5, 1848 – August 31, 1906) was an American politician who served in the Maryland House of Delegates from 1865-1867. He was a direct descendant of the Lords Baltimore, proprietary governors of the Province of Maryland from 1631 until 1776.

== Early life ==
Charles Baltimore Calvert was born on Saturday, February 5, 1848 at the Riversdale Plantation. He was the second son, and third child, born to Charlotte Augusta Norris and Charles Benedict Calvert. He had five siblings survive to adulthood, Ella, George Henry, William Norris, Eugene Stier, and Jules van Havre.

He attended Maryland Agricultural College and graduated in 1863, at the age of 15-years old. The commencement ceremony was held on Friday June 26, 1863, and he gave an "observation and valedictory" speech.

== Career ==
=== Agriculture ===
In April 1866, Calvert was appointed to the board of trustees for the Maryland Agricultural College.

In August 1869, Calvert was named President of the Agricultural Society of Maryland, a group whose formation was originally called for by Calvert's father in 1848.

=== Politics ===
In November 1864, at the age of 16-years old, Charles Baltimore Calvert was elected to the Maryland House of Delegates, and served started in 1865.

Calvert gave in 1866 a speech at a meeting of citizens of Bladensburg District. Later that year, on August 6, 1866, he was chosen to represent Prince George's County in a Maryland State Convention being held in Baltimore. The convention was held to discuss plans for the 1866 National Union Convention to be held in Philadelphia August 14-16.

In October 1866, Calvert was selected to run for re-election to the House of Delegates.

== Personal life ==
Calvert married Eleanor MacKubin on Thursday, June 14, 1866, at St. Paul's Church. Together they had a number of children:

- Eleanor Calvert (1867 - 1920) married William Gibson Carey on June 15, 1892, in a ceremony attended by the governor.
- Hester Virginia Calvert (1869 - 1961) married Henry Walter Lilly on September 20, 1899. Hester and Henry's son Charles Baltimore Calvert Lilly was murdered when he was 22.
- Charlotte Calvert (1870 - 1953)
- Charles Benedict Calvert (1871 - 1872)
- Richard Creagh MacKubin Calvert (1872 - 1947) married Zoe A. Davis, daughter of George Whitefield Davis, on October 18, 1906.
- George Henry Calvert Jr. (1874 - 1950) married N. Peyton Knight April 26, 1905.
- Rosalie Eugenia Stier Calvert (1876 - 1964)
- Charles Baltimore Calvert Jr. (1878 - 1964)
- Elizabeth Steuart Calvert (1882 - 1978)

Calvert died on August 31, 1906, at his MacAlpine home near College Park. He was buried in Rock Creek Cemetery.
