= Goodwood (Upper Marlboro, Maryland) =

Coordinates: 38.8791°N 76.7059°W

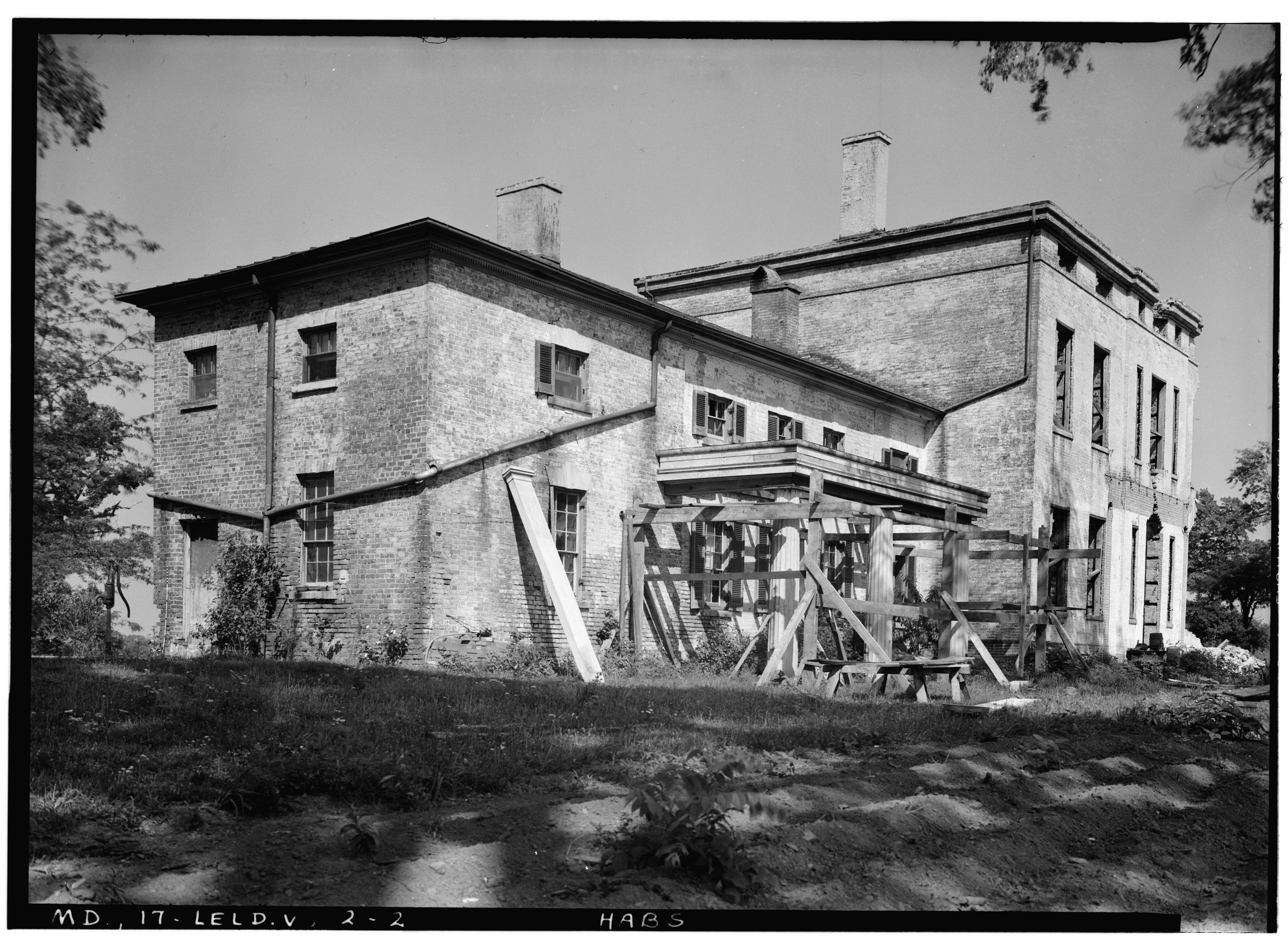
- Goodwood in 1936

General information
- Architectural style: Federal, Greek Revival
- Location: 17200 Clagett Landing Road, Upper Marlboro, Maryland
- Year built: 1799

Technical details
- Material: Brick
- Floor count: 2

Goodwood, once known as Mont Albion or Mont Albon, is a 2-story historic home located at Upper Marlboro, Prince George's County, Maryland, United States. The plantation had 1,200 acres under cultivation at its height, and 72 enslaved people.

The house was built in 1799 by George Calvert (1768–1838) for his daughter, Rosalie Eugenia Calvert.

In 1830, Rosalie married Charles Henry Carter. The couple renamed the house Goodwood after a manor house in Sussex. The Carters expanded the original Federal style structure, and built two additions in the Greek Revival style.

Carter, who came from the Shirley Plantation, was a nephew of Robert E. Lee. General Lee visited frequently, and described visiting Goodwood in May 1859.

The Carters had six children. Their daughter Alice married Maryland Governor Oden Bowie (1826-1894).

The additions burned in 1934. The remaining house is a rural brick villa with a hip roof.

The house remained in the family until 1988.
