= Onorio Razzolini =

Italian immigrant to colonial Maryland (1699–1769)

Onorio Razzolini (1699-1769) was an Italian immigrant to colonial Maryland. He is thought to be the first immigrant of Italian descent to hold public office in the North American colonies. He enjoyed the patronage of Charles Calvert, 5th Baron Baltimore, proprietary governor of the Province of Maryland, serving as tutor to his illegitimate son, Benedict Swingate Calvert. After enjoying a successful career in Maryland, including serving as Armourer and Keeper of the Stores of Maryland, Razzolini returned to his native town of Asolo, where he married and had three daughters.

== Biography ==
Razzolini was born in Asolo, a town located north of Venice, in around 1689.

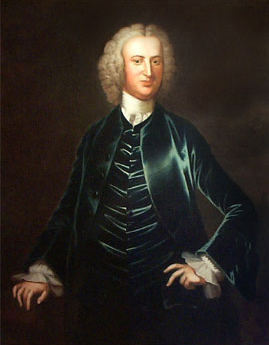
Razzolini's tutee, Benedict Swingate Calvert c1754

Razzolini came from Italy shortly before 1732, as tutor to Benedict Swingate Calvert, the illegitimate son of Charles Calvert, 5th Baron Baltimore, proprietary governor of the Province of Maryland. The young Benedict Calvert lived at the Annapolis home of Maryland politician and planter Dr George Steuart, an Edinburgh-trained physician who was a political ally of the ruling Calvert family.

=== Public Office ===
From around 1732-1747 Razzolini was appointed Armourer and Keeper of the Stores of Maryland. This was an important position, which gave Razzolini some considerable responsibility for the defense of the Colony. Razzolini appears also to have been also a member of the Council and Keeper of the Council Chamber. Razzolini is thought to be the first immigrant of Italian descent to hold public office in the North American colonies.

In 1649 the Maryland Assembly had passed a law permitting French, Dutch and Italian immigrants to own land and enjoy the same rights as English settlers in the Province.

=== Return to Italy ===
Razzolini married Elizabeth Fleury, a Roman Catholic and the only daughter of a French officer who was President of the Parliament of Rouen. Razzolini returned with his bride to Asolo in 1747; her inheritance allowed them to build a fine villa which still stands today. In 1761, after the death of his first wife, he married again and had three daughters.

=== Death and legacy ===
Onorio Razzolini died in Asolo in 1769 at the age of 70. The Villa Razzolini has since 1998 has been open to the public as a restaurant.
