= Riversdale (Riverdale Park, Maryland) =

Historic house in Maryland, United States

- U.S. National Register of Historic Places
- U.S. National Historic Landmark
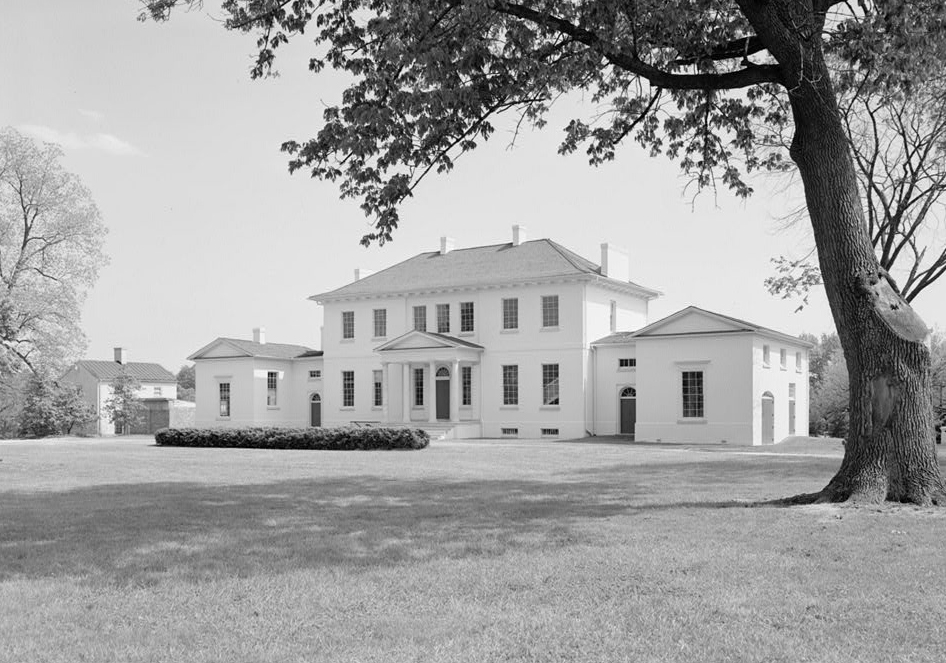
- Riversdale Manor in 1989

- Location within Maryland Location within the United States
- Location: 4811 Riverdale Road, Riverdale Park, Maryland
- Coordinates: 38°57′37″N 76°55′55″W
- Built: 1801–1807
- Architects: Henri-Joseph Stier d'Aertselaer, George Calvert
- Architectural style: Federal, Georgian
- Website: www.pgparks.com/3023/Riversdale-House-Museum
- NRHP reference No.: 73002166

Significant dates
- Added to NRHP: April 11, 1973
- Designated NHL: December 09, 1997

Riversdale, is a five-part, large-scale late Georgian mansion with superior Federal interior, built between 1801 and 1807. Also known as Baltimore House, Calvert Mansion or Riversdale Mansion, it is located at 4811 Riverdale Road in Riverdale Park, Maryland, and is open to the public as a museum.

Once the manor house and centerpiece of a 739-acre (2.99 km^{2}) slave plantation, Riversdale was built for Belgian émigré Henri Joseph Stier, who lived in the William Paca House in Annapolis, Maryland immediately prior to building Riversdale. Stier planned the house in 1801 to resemble his Belgian residence, the Chateau du Mick. Four years later, Stier returned to Belgium, leaving the unfinished Riversdale to be completed by his daughter, Rosalie Stier Calvert and her husband, George Calvert, the son of Benedict Swingate Calvert, who was a natural son of The 5th Baron Baltimore. Rosalie and George Calvert's son, Charles Benedict Calvert, established the Maryland Agricultural College, now the University of Maryland, College Park, on part of the Riversdale property.

While its design has been attributed to William Thornton, this is not supported by available evidence on Thornton's career. The house is architecturally significant as a well-preserved five-part Federal mansion, and historically important for its association with the Calverts, an important Maryland family. It was designated a National Historic Landmark in 1997.

== History ==
The house was begun in 1801 by Henri Josef Stier and his wife Marie Louise Peeters on almost 800 acres (3.2 km^{2}) of land north of Bladensburg. Stier first commissioned Benjamin Henry Latrobe to do design work, but could not wait for Latrobe's late response. The local builder-architect William Lovering carried out the design work to Stier's direction, while Latrobe's rejected design was eventually used at Clifton, in Richmond, Virginia. The east wing was completed first, and the Stiers occupied it in August 1802. The elder Stiers returned to Belgium in June 1803, however, and Rosalie and George Calvert took up residence at Riversdale, bringing with them a large number of enslaved people. Plans for the grounds were developed by landscape architect William Russell Birch in 1805, although much of his plan was unrealized. The west wing was completed in 1806, completing the full five-part ensemble, one of the last of its kind.

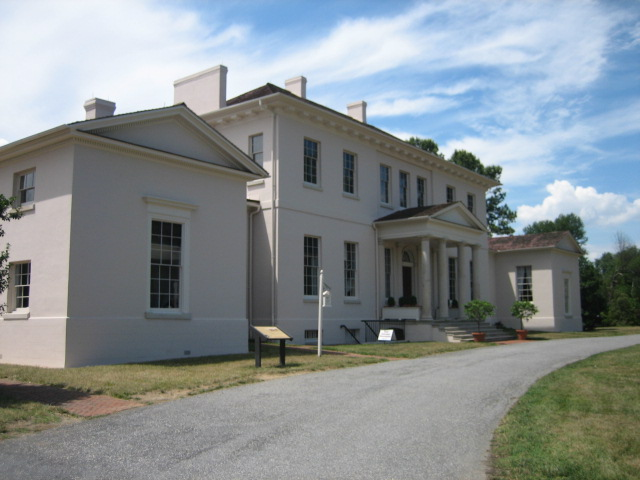
Riversdale in 2007

For thirteen years Riversdale housed the Peeters/Stier collection of European paintings, which was unique in the United States at that time. That collection included more than 63 paintings by such artists as Peter Paul Rubens, Anthony van Dyck, Jan Brueghel the Elder and Titian. Most of the larger pieces were kept in storage, and in 1816 they were returned. Before they were packed, Rembrandt Peale persuaded Rosalie Calvert to display them for two weeks at Riversdale in April 1816. Rosalie became the owner of Riversdale in the same year, but died in 1821. George Calvert continued to live there until his death in 1838. The estate was divided between his sons George Henry and Charles Benedict Calvert. Charles Benedict lived his whole life at Riversdale, pursuing agricultural studies. His unique octagonal "cow-house" was particularly notable, but it burned in 1910. In July 1845, the homestead was highlighted in the first issue of the monthly publicaiton, The American Farmer. Charles Benedict died in 1864. The property was then divided between his widow Charlotte and five children, with Charlotte in the mansion. The 300-acre (120 ha) core of the property was eventually sold to John Fox and Alexander Lutz of New York in 1887.

Fox and Lutz acquired an adjacent 174-acre (70 ha) property that belonged to George Henry Calvert and began to develop it as the town of Riverdale. The new town offered convenient transportation into Washington on the B&O railroad line that ran through the property. The mansion was preserved in a park, but was eventually used as a boarding house. Thomas H. Pickford bought the house in 1912 and undertook renovations, making significant alterations to the wings and moving some of the original mantels to his house in New York. From 1917 to 1929 the house was occupied by California U.S. Senator Hiram Johnson. The sale of Riversdale in 1926 to Senator Thaddeus H. Caraway of Arkansas, was a consternation to Johnson, whose lease ran until 1929. Johnson moved out in the spring of 1929, the Caraways moved in. The Caraways undertook other renovations but Thaddeus died in November 1931. His widow, Hattie Wyatt Caraway, took over his seat and was twice elected but was unable to meet the mortgage. A foreclosure sale ensued, and in 1932, Thomas H. Pickford purchased the property, selling the following year to former Oregon congressman Abraham Walter Lafferty. Lafferty lived at Riversdale from 1933 to 1949, attempting to buy the parcel to the south of the mansion from Hattie Caraway. Mrs. Caraway, however, sold the parcel to a developer in 1947, who drained the small lake and built houses. Lafferty sold Riversdale in 1949 to the Maryland-National Capital Park and Planning Commission for its Prince George's County regional office. The offices remained there until 1982, when structural concerns caused the offices to be moved to other quarters. Restoration ensued, and the house opened to the public in 1993.

== Description ==
Riversdale is a Federal style five-part mansion with a 2-story main block and 1 1/2-story end pavilions linked by 1 1/2-story hyphens. The seven-bay stucco-covered brick central block features a hip roof. An entry porch with Tuscan columns and a small pediment shelters double entry doors on the front. The porch sits in a three-bay indentation, which is symmetrical to both the north and south sides of the house. The front doors are topped by a fanlight. The north porch has a dairy storage area beneath. A low brick basement story is lighted by fixed four-light windows. The south, or garden porch has a hipped roof supported by four Tuscan columns. Triple-sash windows open onto the porch, permitting passage from the porch to the center parlor. Both porches have floors of black, white and pink marble. Apart from the windows on the south porch, windows are typically nine-over-nine sashes on the first floor and six-over-nine on the second. The roof is clad in wood singles, painted red, with four stucco-covered chimneys, one of which is a dummy for the sake of symmetry. Similarly, one second-floor window on the north side is false.

The three-by-one-bay end pavilions are turned so that their narrow ends face north and south, with pedimented windows in the center of the main bay. The east pavilion served as the kitchen and has a central entrance on the east side. The west wing contained the stable and carriage house, but was altered in the 1930s as a music room. The 1993 renovation has returned the west elevation to its original form with two doors and three windows. The connecting hyphens each have entrances centered in the north elevations.

The interior of the first floor contains three parlors across the south side of the house. On the north side is a central entry hall, with a stair hall on the right and a service hall on the left. All spaces have elaborate original woodwork. The central parlor, or salon de milieu, is the most elaborate space, with wood Ionic pilasters, plaster ceiling decoration and a plaster cornice. The east parlor served as the dining room. The west parlor was the salle de compagnie. The second floor is arranged similarly to the first, with the chief chambers above the east and west parlors. Each chamber has an adjoining dressing chamber. A smaller bedchamber with curved walls on the east and west occupies the center. The north side has several smaller chambers. One window is partially obstructed at the stair hall, blanked on the northeast bedchamber. An unusual mezzanine level with a ceiling height of just over six feet lies between the first and second floors on the northeast side, connected with areas on the same level in the east hyphen and pavilion. The main level of the east hyphen housed a breakfast room, which was altered in 1912 by the removal of the rooms above into a banquet room. The upper levels have since been restored to provide a caretaker's apartment. The west hyphen was the slave plantation proprietor's study. The former carriage house and stables, damaged by fire in the late 1920s, was converted into a two-story music room.

The basement contains a number of spaces, used principally for storage, including a wine cellar and an interior connection to the dairy under the front stairs. There are crawl spaces under the wings, with impressive brick arches.

A three-by-one-bay secondary structure, or dependency, stands to the east of the east wing. The 2-story stucco-covered brick building was used as a kitchen, with single spaces on each level. Archeological studies have revealed the foundations of other structures, including a water tower, wash house and hothouse.

== Gallery ==
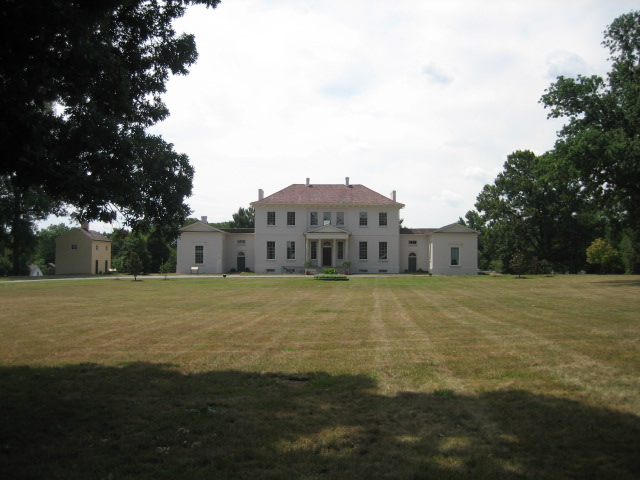
Riversdale, July 2007

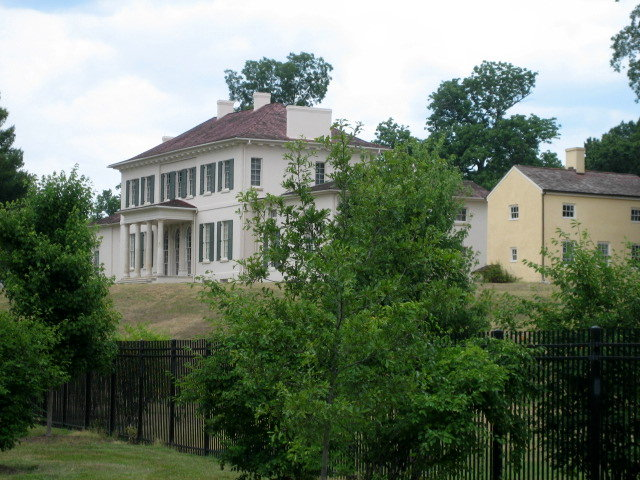
Riversdale Manor in July 2007

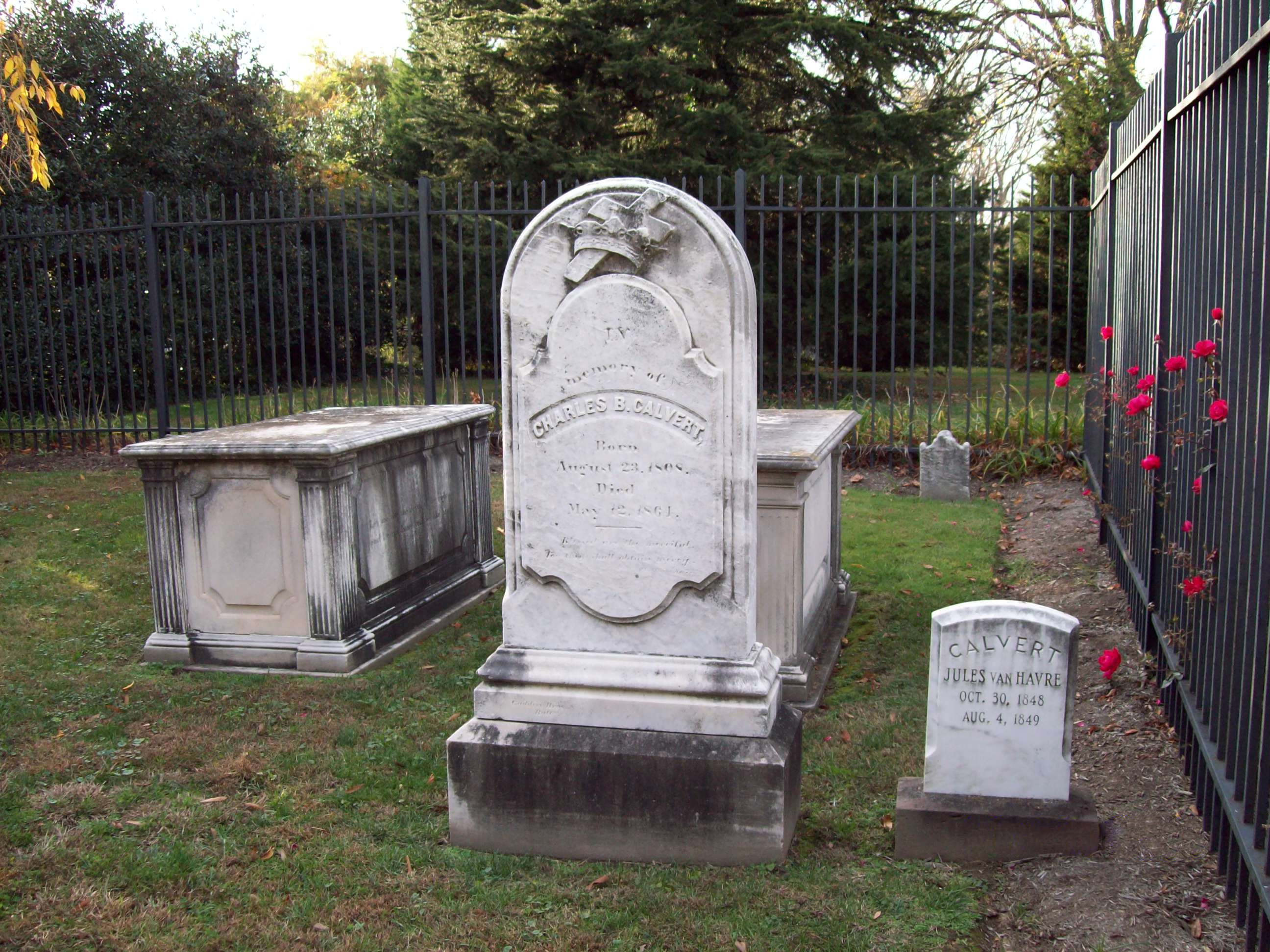
Calvert Family Cemetery in November 2008

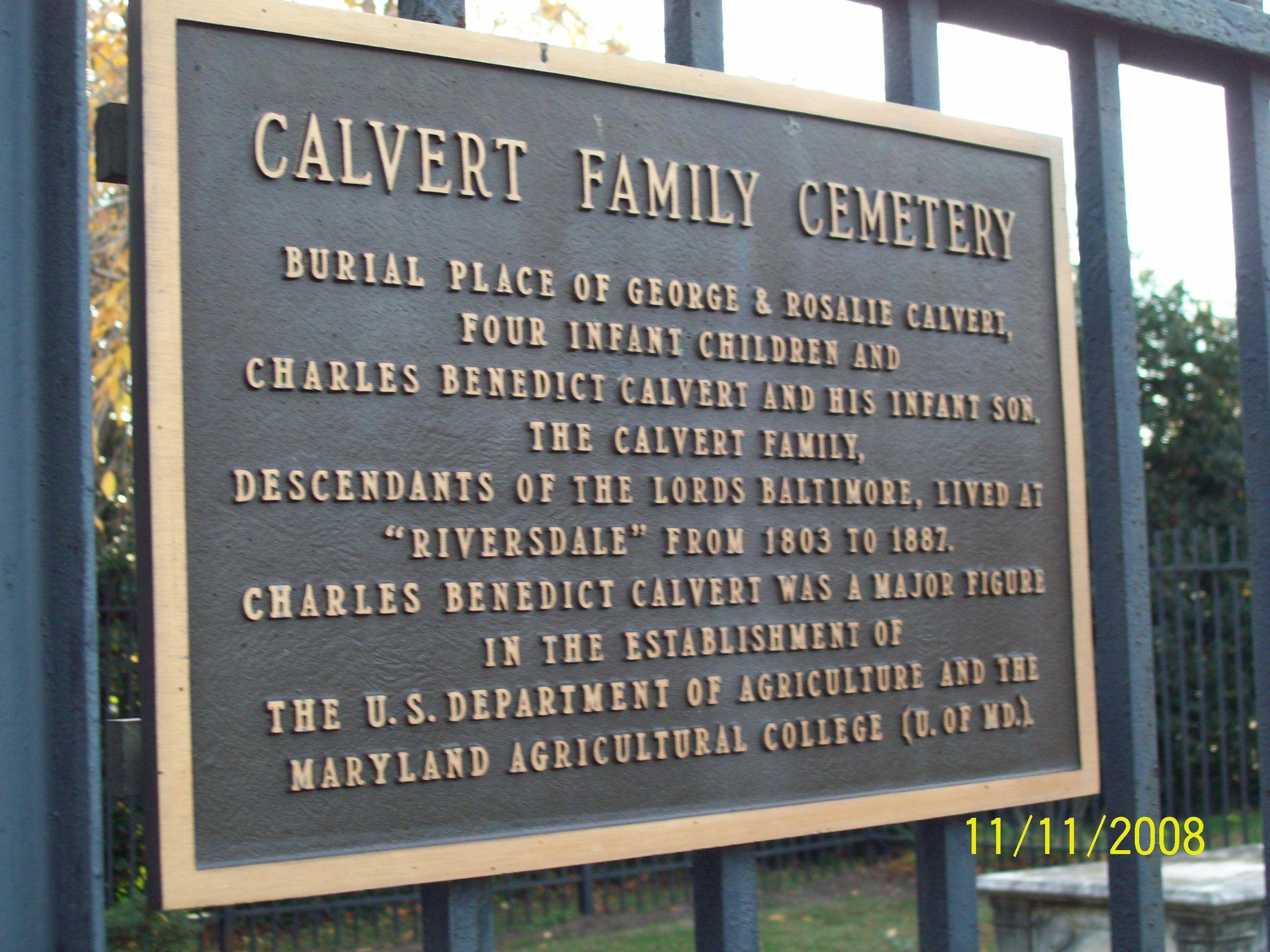
Plaque Commemorating the Calvert Family Cemetery in November 2008
