= Benedict Swingate Calvert =

American planter, politician, and judge (1722–1788)

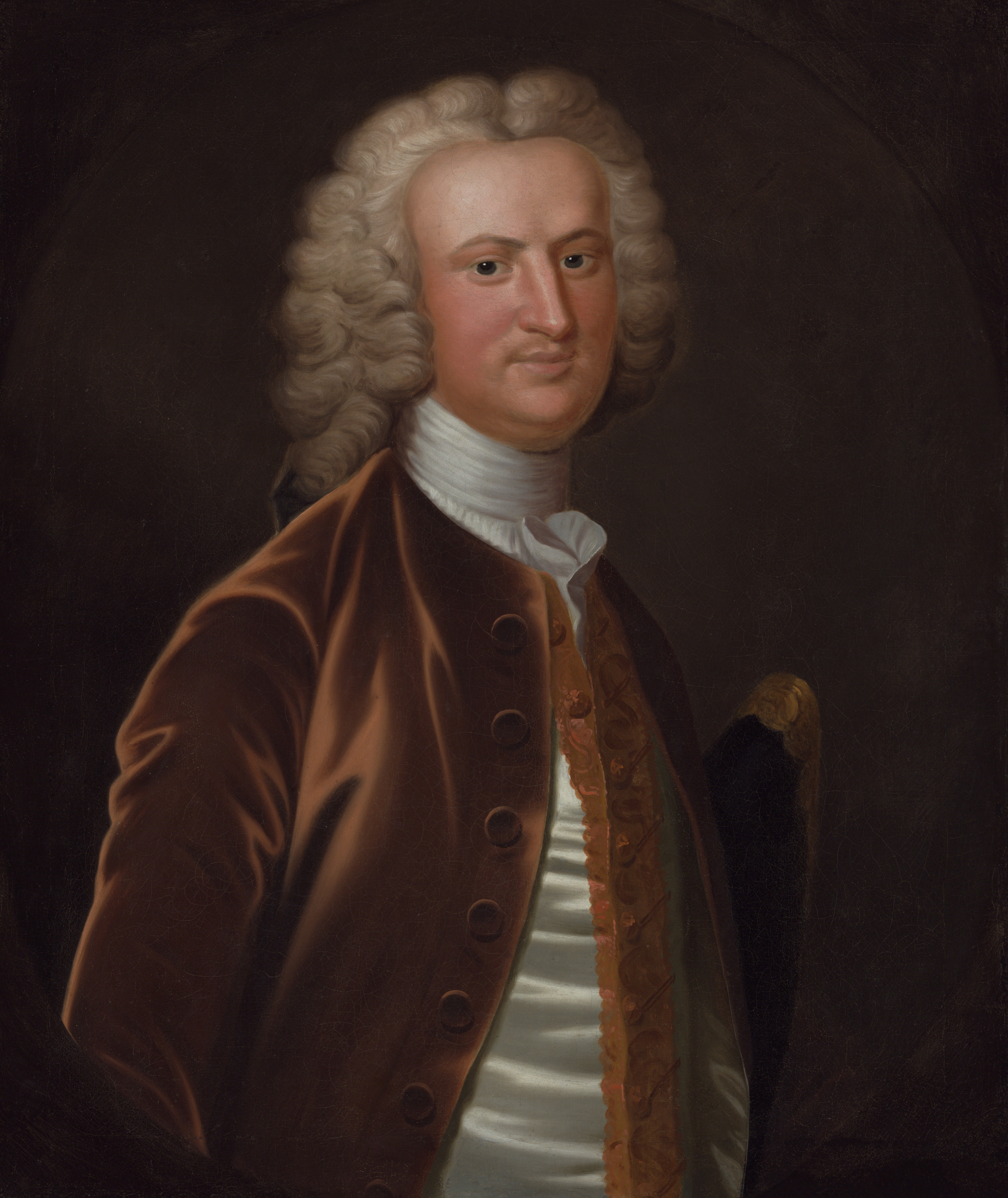
- Portrait by John Wollaston, 1754

Judge of the Land Office
- In office 1755 – May 13, 1777
- Succeeded by: St George Peale

Personal details
- Born: January 27, 1722 Epsom, Surrey, England
- Died: January 9, 1788 (aged 65) Mount Airy, Prince George’s County, Maryland
- Spouse: Elizabeth Calvert
- Children: 13, including: Eleanor Calvert; George Calvert
- Parent: Charles Calvert, 5th Baron Baltimore (father)
- Occupation: planter, politician

Benedict Swingate Calvert (January 27, 1722 – January 9, 1788) was an American planter, politician, and judge from Maryland who was a Loyalist during the American Revolution. He was the son of Charles Calvert, 5th Baron Baltimore, the third Proprietor Governor of Maryland (1699–1751). His mother's identity is not known, though one source speculates that she was Melusina von der Schulenburg, Countess of Walsingham. As he was illegitimate, he was not able to inherit his father's title or estates, which passed instead to his half brother Frederick Calvert, 6th Baron Baltimore (1731–1771). Benedict Calvert spent most of his life as a politician, judge and planter in Maryland, though Frederick, by contrast, never visited the colony. Calvert became wealthy through proprietarial patronage and became an important colonial official, but he would lose his offices and his political power, though not his land and wealth, during the American Revolution.

== Early life ==
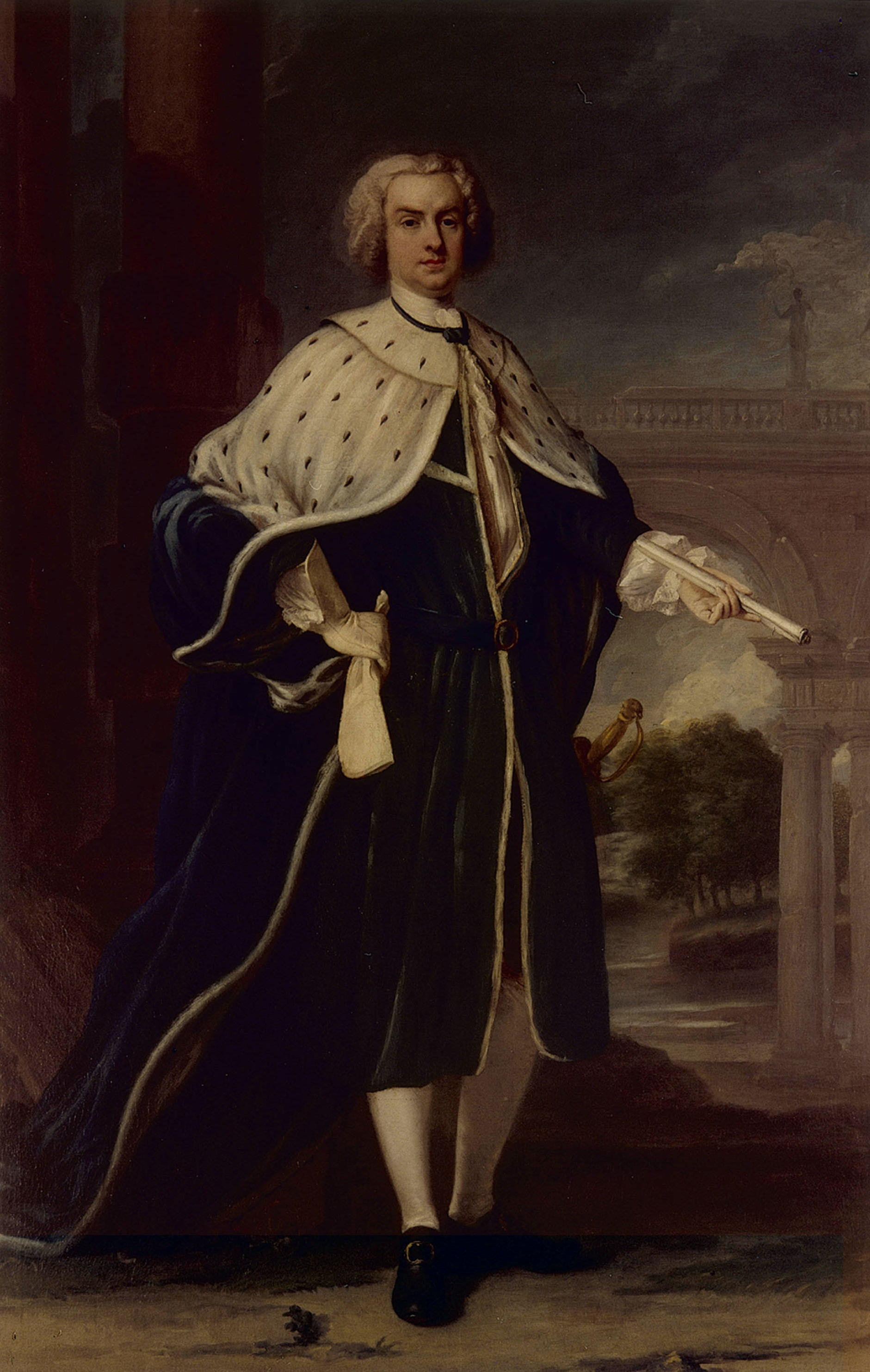
Calvert's father, Charles Calvert, 5th Baron Baltimore

Calvert was born Benedict Swinket in England on January 27, 1722, the illegitimate son of Charles Calvert, 5th Baron Baltimore, proprietary governor of the Province of Maryland. His birth year has been variously given as 1724, 1730 and 1732, but the grave stone in the floor of the chancery of St. Thomas Episcopal Church in Croom, Maryland gives the date of January 27, 1722.

His mother's identity is not known. H. S. Lee Washington, writing in the New England Historic Genealogical Society Register in July 1950, speculates that she was Melusina von der Schulenburg, Countess of Walsingham, the daughter of George I of Great Britain and his mistress, Melusine von der Schulenburg, Duchess of Kendal.

According to a letter of Benedict's daughter-in-law Rosalie Stier Calvert dated 10 June 1814, Calvert's mother had been a woman "of the highest rank in England".

== Arrival in Maryland ==
In around 1736 or 1737, the young Benedict was sent to the Calverts' proprietary colony of Maryland, which in the mid 18th century was still a somewhat sparsely settled, largely rural society. In 1730 the population of Annapolis was just 776. The population of colony was 120,000 at the time.

According to the letters of Rosalie Stier Calvert, Benedict was personally escorted to Annapolis on a frigate commanded by Admiral Edward Vernon, though this seems unlikely. On arrival, the boy was placed in the care of Dr George Steuart (1700–1784), an Edinburgh-trained physician and a political ally of the ruling Calvert family. Steuart provided the boy with a tutor, the Italian Onorio Razzolini, the first immigrant of Italian descent to hold public office in the North American colonies.

Benedict Calvert grew up at Steuart's "old-fashioned house" on Francis St in Annapolis, just off State Circle and a short walk from the Maryland State House. At least once he was beaten by a town bully; his attacker was brought before the County Court and whipped. In 1738 he witnessed a will under his childhood name of Swingate (or "Swinket"), and it is likely that at this time his father's identity was not widely known; later he would take his father's name. Dr Steuart's house was a short distance from the home of Benedict Calvert's second cousin, Elizabeth Calvert (1731–1788), whom he would later marry. Elizabeth was the daughter of Maryland Governor Captain Charles Calvert and his wife Rebecca Gerard, both of whom died young, leaving Elizabeth a wealthy heiress.

== Politics and marriage ==
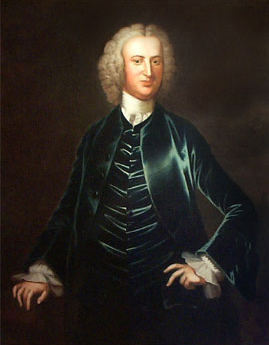
Benedict Swingate Calvert, painted by John Wollaston c. 1754.

Through his family connections Calvert was able to benefit from considerable proprietarial patronage, at least until the American Revolution in 1776 ended proprietarial rule in Maryland. In 1745 he was appointed by his father the Patuxent district customs collector and naval officer, a post which permitted him to retain a portion of the customs fees. He also served as an Annapolis council member.

Benedict Calvert would never return to England; nor would he meet his father again. Some time before his death in 1751, Lord Baltimore wrote to his son, offering advice on marriage:

Pray do not think of Marrying until you hear from me having some things to Propose for you, much for your advantage, and believe me I will never force Your Inclination, Only Propose what I think will make you most Happy, Afterwards Leave it to Your own Determination.

On April 21, 1748, Benedict and his cousin Elizabeth Calvert were married in St Ann's Church by the Reverend John Gordon. The couple, aged 18 and 17 years, respectively, moved into Elizabeth's house at 58 State Circle, Annapolis.

The marriage was announced in the Maryland Gazette on April 27, 1748:

Last Thursday the Honourable Benedict Calvert, Esq., Collector of His Majesty's customs for Patuxent District, etc., was married to Miss Elizabeth Calvert, only surviving Daughter of the late Honourable Charles Calvert, Esq., deceased, former Governor of this province.

In 1751 Calvert's father Charles Calvert, 5th Baron Baltimore died, leaving his illegitimate son the 10,000-acre (40 km^{2}) estate of Anne Arundel Manor in Anne Arundel County. Unfortunately, Lord Baltimore's legitimate son and heir, Frederick Calvert, 6th Baron Baltimore, successfully challenged the will and invalidated Benedict's bequest, apparently worth £288 per annum.

Despite the loss of his father's bequest, Calvert's career progressed steadily. In 1755 he became a Judge of the Land Office, sitting alongside his former guardian Dr. George H. Steuart. The Land Office had been created in 1715 to resolve disputes over title to land in the colony.

By 1761 Calvert was wealthy enough to commission formal portraits of his four children: Rebecca, Charles and the twins Eleanor and Elizabeth, by the Maryland portrait painter John Hesselius, three of which are today a part of the permanent collection of the Baltimore Museum of Art.

In 1769 his half-sister Caroline Calvert married Robert Eden (the last royal governor and ancestor of Anthony Eden, British Prime Minister) who in the same year succeeded Governor Horatio Sharpe as Governor of Maryland. Eden and Calvert shared a love of horse racing and Benedict Swingate Calvert would soon find himself appointed to the Governor's Council.

== Mount Airy Plantation ==
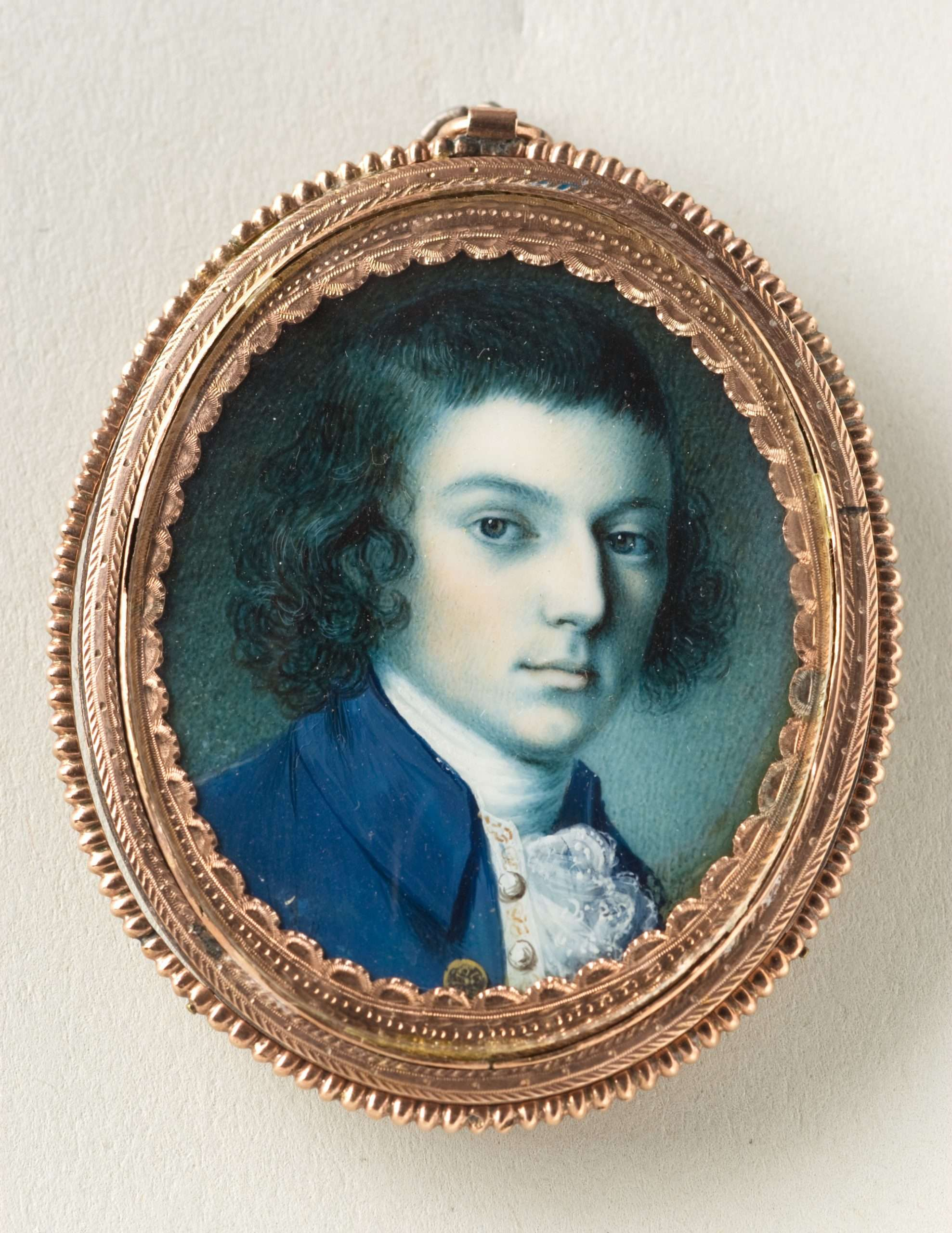
John Parke Custis, Calvert's son-in-law

In 1751 Calvert inherited a 4,000-acre (16 km^{2}) plantation known as Mount Airy, originally a hunting lodge for his great-grandfather Charles Calvert, 3rd Baron Baltimore, near Upper Marlboro in Prince George's County, Maryland, where he grew tobacco. Mount Airy was most likely a gift from his father, Lord Baltimore, who had ensured that Calvert would be provided with lands and revenues. Calvert began construction on the house at Mount Airy in 1751, expanding it considerably, to create the house which still survives today. Building continued in spite of a fire, rumored to be arson, in 1752.

By the 1770s Benedict Swingate Calvert controlled a large and profitable estate of around 4,000 acres, with upwards of 150 slaves. He was also an enthusiastic horse breeder, training thoroughbreds and running them in competitions in Maryland and Virginia.

According to the writer Abbe Robin, who travelled through Maryland during the Revolutionary War, men of Calvert's class and status enjoyed considerable wealth and prosperity:

[Maryland houses] are large and spacious habitations, widely separated, composed of a number of buildings and surrounded by plantations extending farther than the eye can reach, cultivated...by unhappy black men whom European avarice brings hither...Their furniture is of the most costly wood, and rarest marbles, enriched by skilful and artistic work. Their elegant and light carriages are drawn by finely bred horses, and driven by richly apparelled slaves.

In 1774, Calvert's daughter Eleanor Calvert (1758–1811), married John Parke Custis, son of Martha Washington and the stepson of George Washington. Washington himself did not approve of the match owing to the couple's youth, but eventually gave his consent, and was present at the wedding celebrations, which took place at Mount Airy.

== American Revolution ==
As a member of the Maryland political establishment, Calvert was a Loyalist, and he soon found himself on the losing side of the Revolutionary War, the consequences of which would effectively end his political career. The Annapolis Convention of 1774 to 1776 would see the old Maryland elite overthrown, and Calvert, Eden and Steuart would all lose their political power.

In 1774, as collector of customs for the Patuxent River, Calvert wrote to the British authorities, describing the burning of the Peggy Stewart on October 19, 1774, the event which became known as the "Annapolis Tea Party".

On May 13, 1777, Calvert was forced to resign his position as Judge of the Land Office. As the conflict grew, Calvert became fearful of his family's safety, writing in late 1777 that his family "has been made so uneasy by these frequent outrages" that he wished to "remove my family and property where I can get protection".

Calvert did not leave Maryland, nor did he involve himself in the fighting, even though many other Maryland Loyalists went on to form a Maryland Loyalists Battalion. On occasion Calvert supplied the Continental Army with food and provisions.

In spite of the war, on June 15, 1780, Calvert's daughter Elizabeth was married to Charles Steuart, son of Calvert's benefactor George H. Steuart, at Mount Airy Mansion.

== After the war ==
After the war's end, Calvert had to pay triple taxes as did other Loyalists, but he was never forced to sign the loyalty oath and his lands and property remained unconfiscated.

Calvert's Loyalism does not appear to have affected his cordial relations with the leader of the Revolution, George Washington. Most likely this was because of the marriage in 1774 of Washington's stepson to Calvert's daughter. In 1783, after the war was over, Washington stayed with the Calverts at their Mount Airy plantation, shortly after resigning his commission in Annapolis on December 23. Because Calvert was a known Loyalist, the visit drew much criticism from Washington's political enemies.

== Family life ==
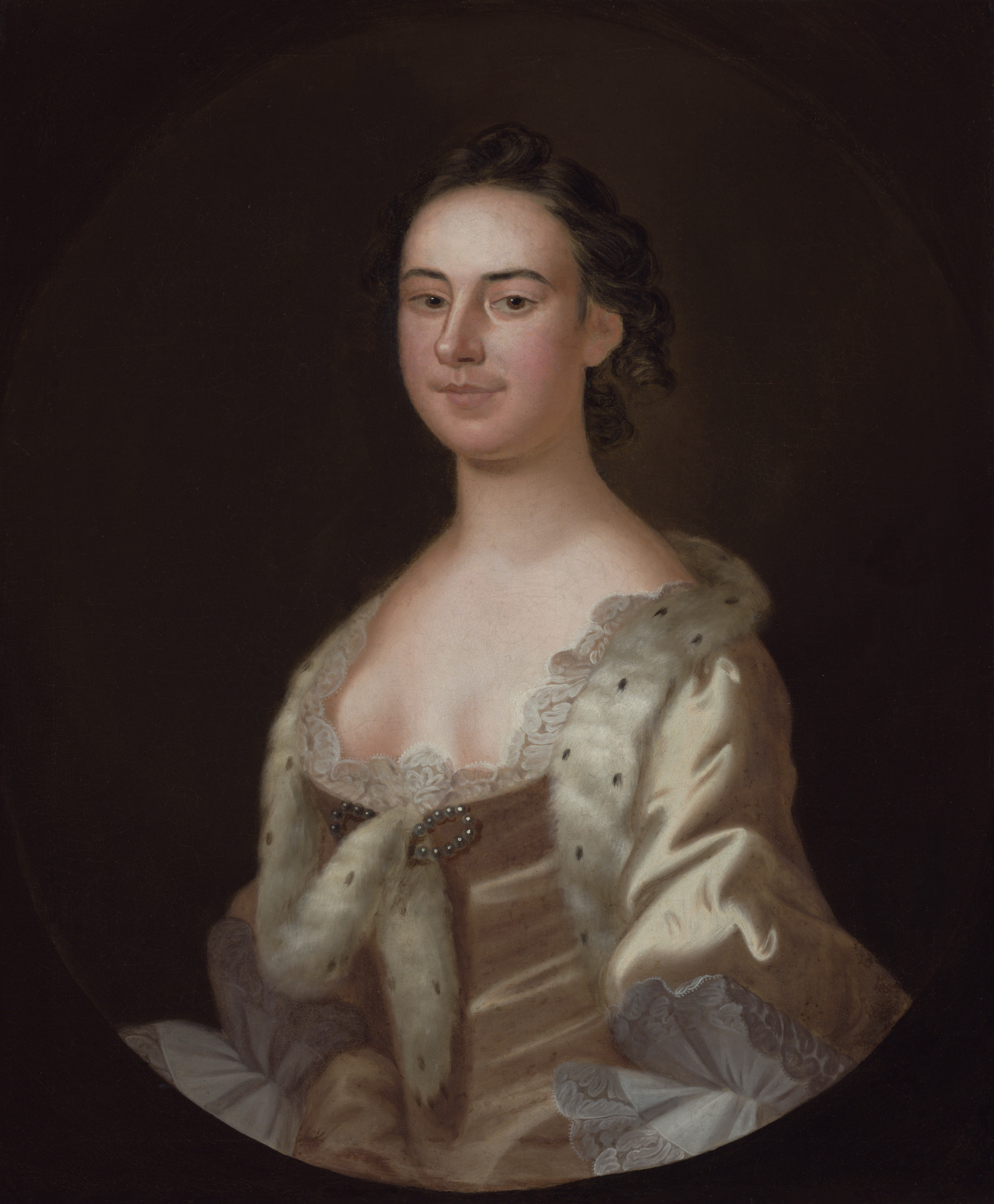
1754 portrait of Elizabeth Calvert by John Wollaston

Benedict and Elizabeth Calvert had thirteen children, many of whom died in childhood:

- Rebecca Calvert (born December 25, 1749)
- Charles Calvert (1756–1777), who was sent to be educated in England at Eton College and died young and unmarried.
- Eleanor Calvert (1757/1758–1811), who on February 3, 1774, married John Parke Custis (1754–1781), son of Daniel Parke Custis and Martha Washington and the stepson of George Washington. Washington himself did not approve of the match owing to the couple's youth. Eleanor and John were the parents of George Washington Parke Custis, born 1781 and Eleanor Parke Custis Lewis born 1779. George married Mary Lee Fitzhugh. Their daughter Mary Ann Custis, born in 1807, married Robert E. Lee. Eleanor remarried in 1783 to David Stuart.
- Elizabeth Calvert (1760–1814), who on June 15, 1780, married the physician Charles Mark Steuart (1750–1798/1822), third son of Calvert's former guardian George H. Steuart.
- Philip Calvert, died young
- Leonard Calvert, died young
- Cecilius Calvert, died young
- John Calvert (died after 1788)
- William Calvert (died after 1788)
- Robert Calvert, died young
- Ariana Calvert (1763–1788)
- Edward Henry Calvert (November 7, 1766 – July 12, 1846), who inherited Calvert's plantation at Mount Airy and married on March 1, 1796, Elizabeth Biscoe (1780–1857)
- George Calvert (1768 – 1838), who in 1799 married Rosalie Eugenia Stier (1778–1821), the daughter of a wealthy Belgian aristocrat, Baron Henri Joseph Stier (1743–1821) and his wife Marie Louise Peeters. They lived at the Riversdale plantation, designated a National Historic Landmark in 1997.

== Death and legacy ==
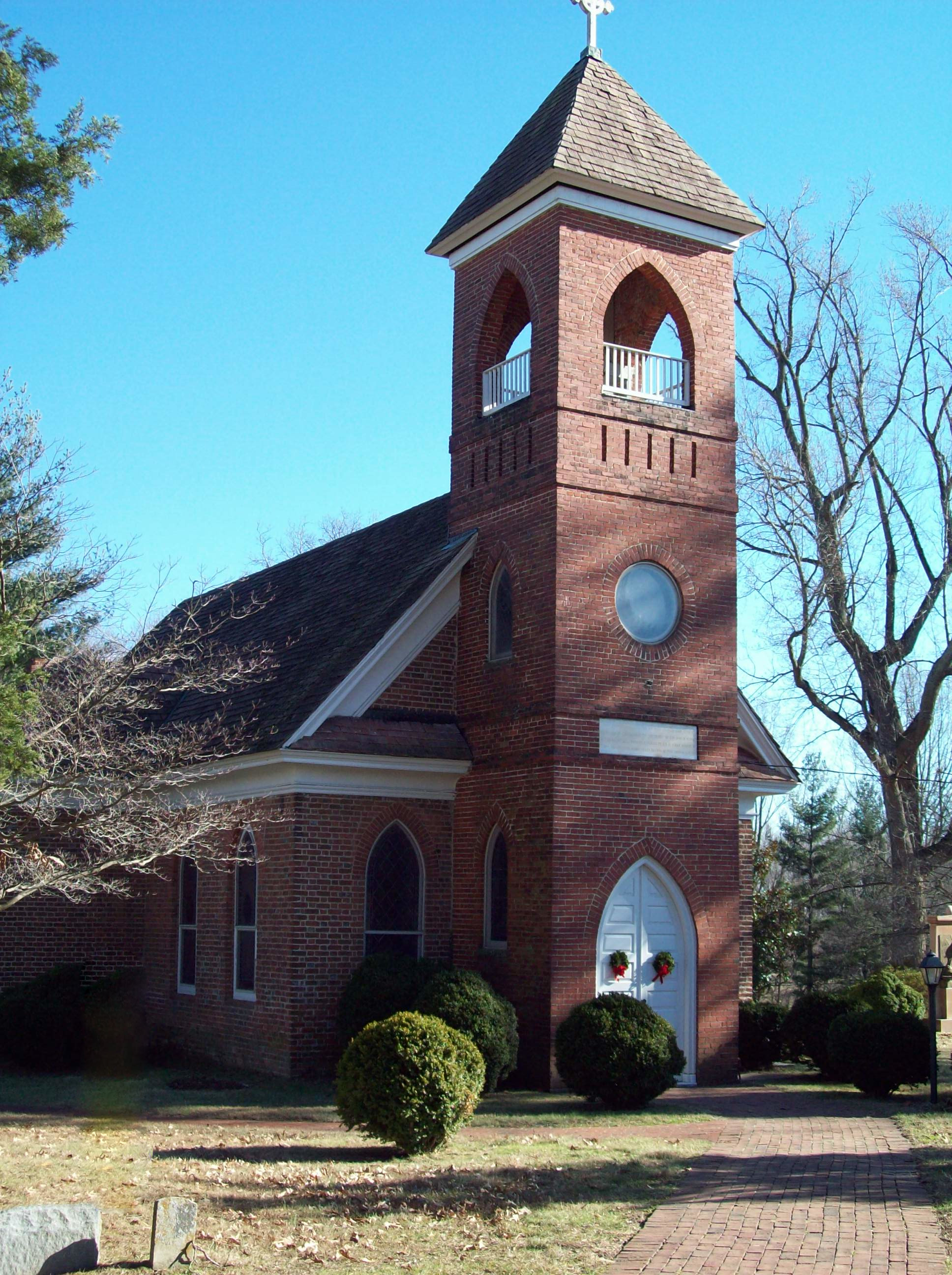
Calvert is buried beneath the chancel of the church of St Thomas in Croom, Prince George's County, Maryland.

Benedict Swingate Calvert died at Mount Airy on January 9, 1788. He was buried beneath the chancel of the church of St Thomas in Croom, Prince George's County, Maryland, a church which Calvert had helped to found and maintain.

Calvert's descendants continued to live at the Mount Airy plantation house until the early 20th century. In 1973, it was acquired by the State of Maryland and became Rosaryville State Park.

== Gallery ==
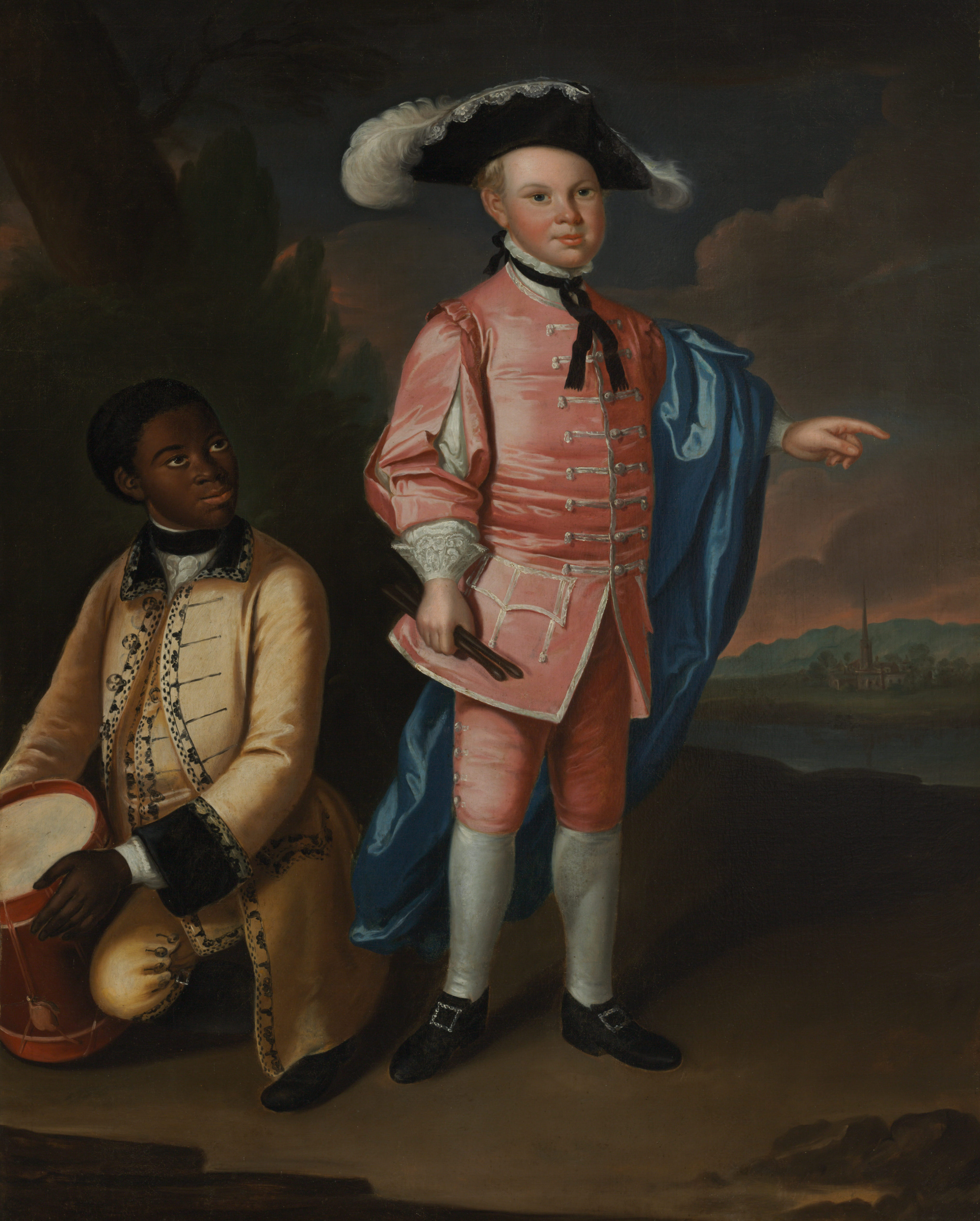
Charles Calvert, eldest son of Benedict Swingate Calvert, painted by John Hesselius in 1761

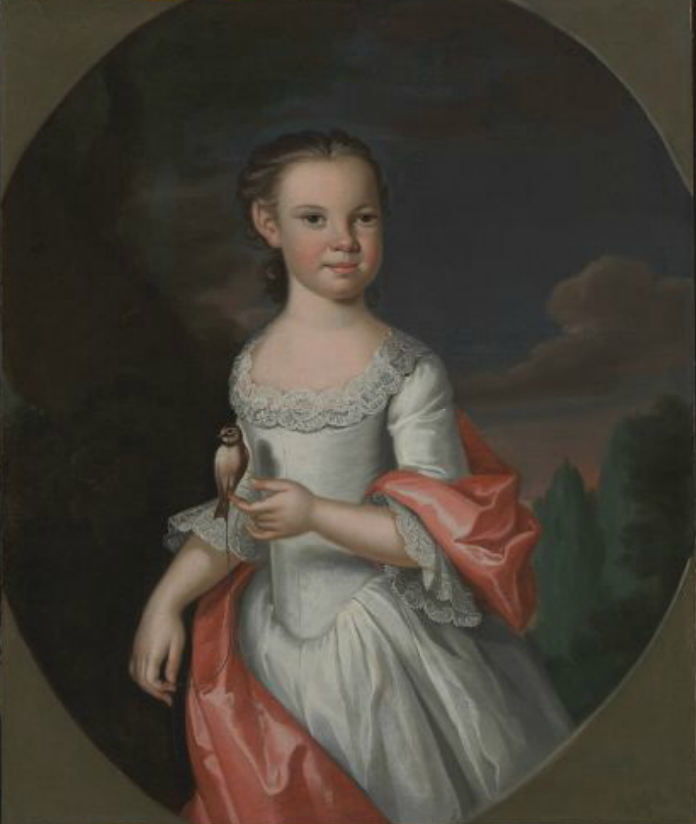
Painting of Eleanor Calvert by John Hesselius, 1728–1778, c. 1761

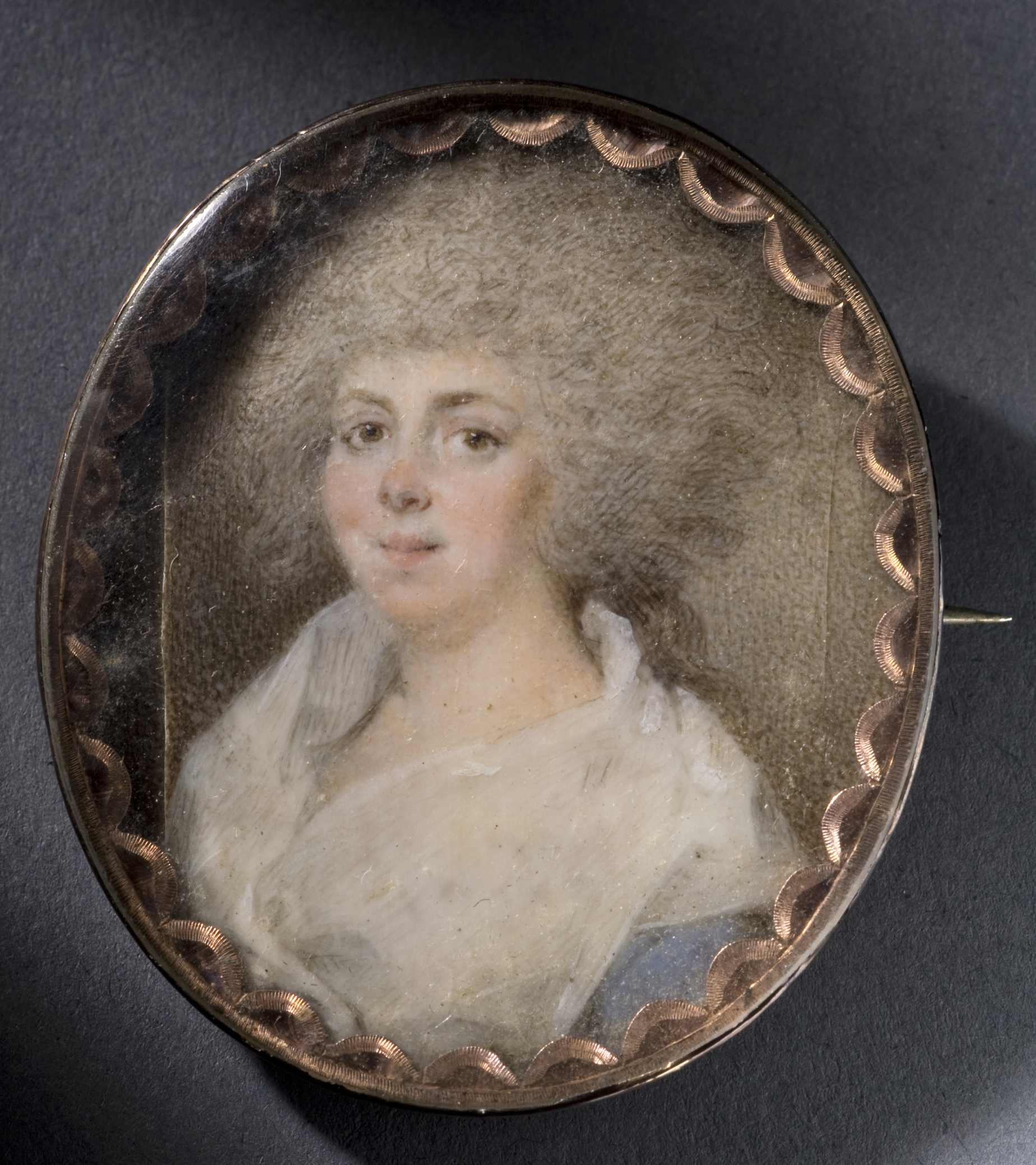
Miniature of Eleanor Calvert (1758–1811), eldest surviving daughter of Benedict Swingate Calvert, c. 1780

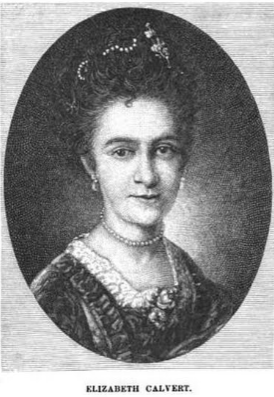
Miniature of Elizabeth Calvert (1760–1814), youngest daughter of Benedict Swingate Calvert, painted by Benjamin West

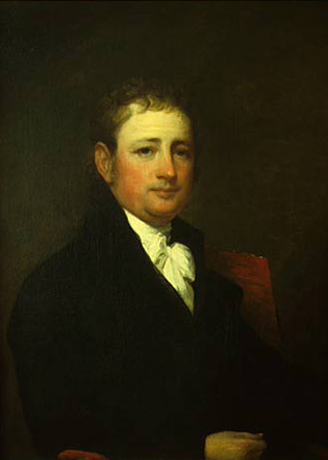
George Calvert (1768–1838) by Gilbert Stuart 1804

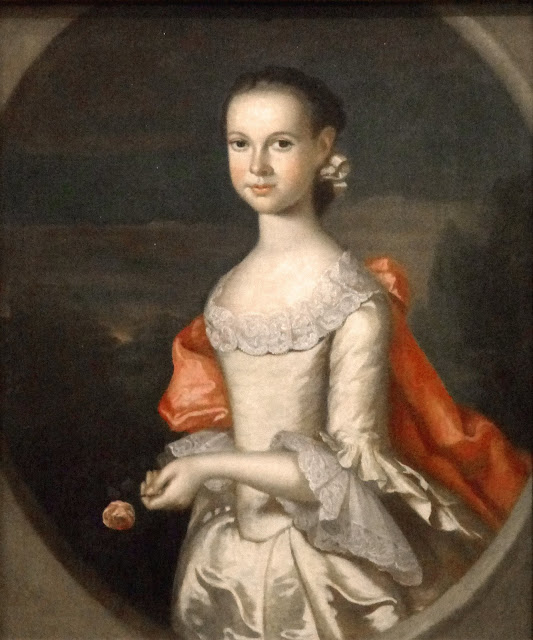
Elizabeth Calvert, daughter of Benedict Swingate Calvert, painted by John Hesselius

== Ancestry ==
Benedict Swingate Calvert's ancestors in three generations
Benedict Swingate Calvert (c. 1730–1798)	Father: Charles Calvert, 5th Baron Baltimore	Paternal grandfather: Benedict Calvert, 4th Baron Baltimore	Paternal great-grandfather: Charles Calvert, 3rd Baron Baltimore
Benedict Swingate Calvert (c. 1730–1798)	Father: Charles Calvert, 5th Baron Baltimore	Paternal grandfather: Benedict Calvert, 4th Baron Baltimore	Paternal great-grandmother: Jane Lowe
Benedict Swingate Calvert (c. 1730–1798)	Father: Charles Calvert, 5th Baron Baltimore	Paternal grandmother: Charlotte Lee, Lady Baltimore	Paternal great-grandfather: Edward Lee, 1st Earl of Lichfield
Benedict Swingate Calvert (c. 1730–1798)	Father: Charles Calvert, 5th Baron Baltimore	Paternal grandmother: Charlotte Lee, Lady Baltimore	Paternal great-grandmother: Charlotte Lee, Countess of Lichfield
Benedict Swingate Calvert (c. 1730–1798)	Mother: Unknown. Speculatively, Melusina von der Schulenburg, Countess of Walsingham (1693–1778)	Maternal grandfather: George I of Great Britain	Maternal great-grandfather: Ernest Augustus, Elector of Brunswick-Lüneburg
Benedict Swingate Calvert (c. 1730–1798)	Mother: Unknown. Speculatively, Melusina von der Schulenburg, Countess of Walsingham (1693–1778)	Maternal grandfather: George I of Great Britain	Maternal great-grandmother: Sophia of Hanover
Benedict Swingate Calvert (c. 1730–1798)	Mother: Unknown. Speculatively, Melusina von der Schulenburg, Countess of Walsingham (1693–1778)	Maternal grandmother: Melusine von der Schulenburg, Duchess of Kendal	Maternal great-grandfather: Gustavus Adolphus Baron von der Schulenberg
Benedict Swingate Calvert (c. 1730–1798)	Mother: Unknown. Speculatively, Melusina von der Schulenburg, Countess of Walsingham (1693–1778)	Maternal grandmother: Melusine von der Schulenburg, Duchess of Kendal	Maternal great-grandmother: Petronella Ottilie Baroness von Schwencken

=== Modern archeology ===
The Calverts' house at 58 State Circle, Annapolis, was the subject of an archaeological dig in the 1980s and early 1990s. The results of the dig, along with much other research, were published in 1994 by Anne Elizabeth Yentsch in her book A Chesapeake Family and their Slaves, published by Cambridge University Press. The excavation of the Calvert House was financed by Historic Annapolis Inc, the National Endowment for the Humanities, and other institutions.

== See also ==
- Charles Calvert, 5th Baron Baltimore
- Frederick Calvert, 6th Baron Baltimore
- Loyalist (American Revolution)
- Maryland in the American Revolution
- Province of Maryland
- Proprietary colony
