= Brice House (Annapolis, Maryland) =

Historic house in Maryland

- U.S. National Register of Historic Places
- U.S. National Historic Landmark
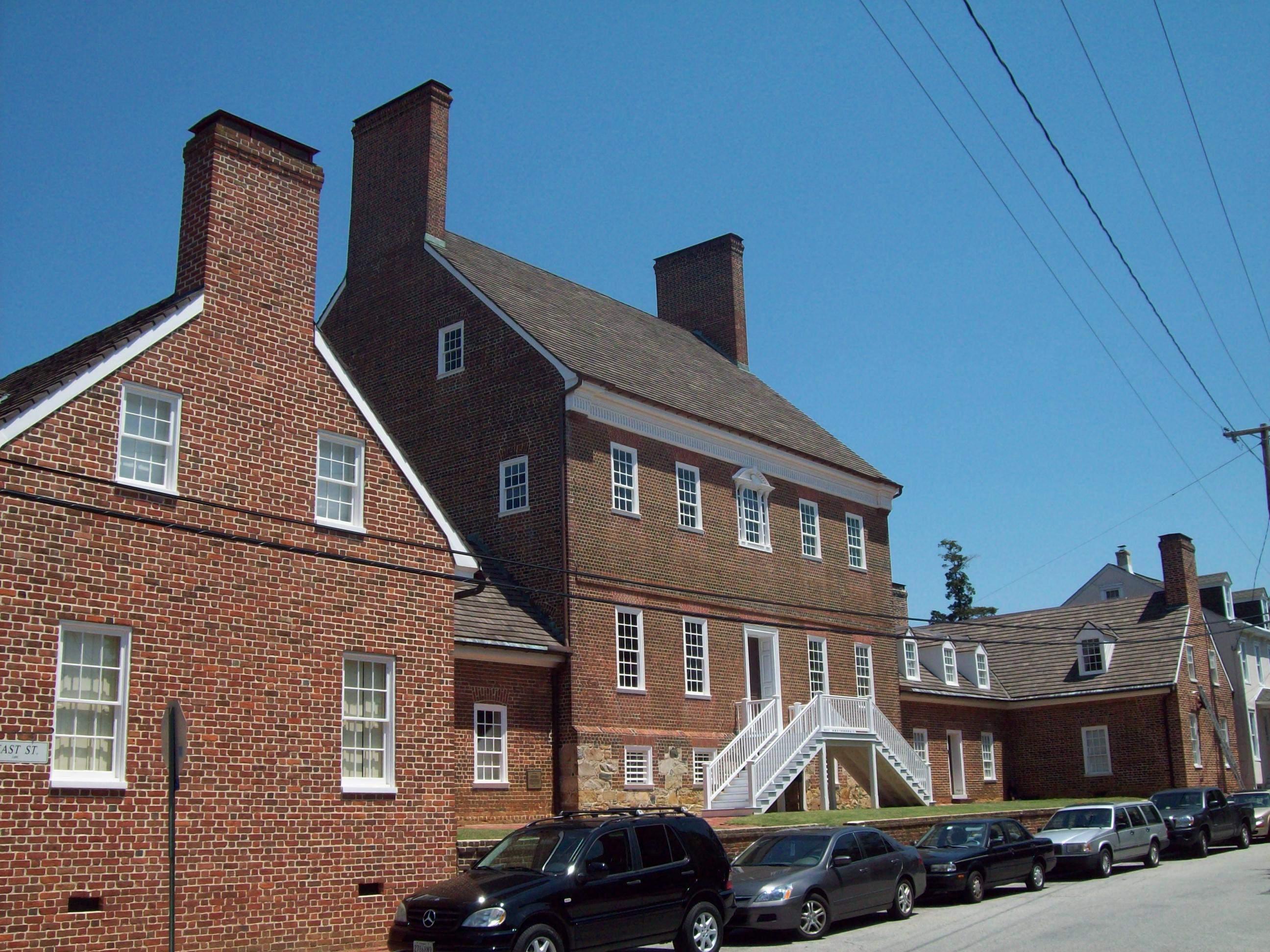
- Brice House, July 2009

- Location within Maryland Location within the United States
- Location: 42 East Street, Annapolis, Maryland
- Coordinates: 38°58′45.5″N 76°29′14″W
- Built: 1766
- Architect: Buckland, William (interiors)
- Architectural style: Georgian
- NRHP reference No.: 70000259

Significant dates
- Added to NRHP: April 15, 1970
- Designated NHL: April 15, 1970

The Brice House is, along with the Hammond-Harwood House and the William Paca House, one of three similar preserved 18th-century Georgian style brick houses in Annapolis, Maryland. Like the Paca and Hammond-Harwood houses, it is a five-part brick mansion with a large central block and flanking pavilions with connecting hyphens. Of the three, the Brice House's exterior is the most austere, giving its brickwork particular prominence. The Brice House was declared a National Historic Landmark in 1970.

== History ==
The Brice house was built by James Brice, who served as Mayor of Annapolis (1782–83 and 1787–88) and as acting Governor of Maryland in 1792. The house remained in the Brice family until 1874. The house was purchased by St. John's College in the 1920s and was used as a faculty residence. In 1953 the house was acquired by Mr. and Mrs. Stanley S. Wohl, who undertook restorations in 1953 and 1957.

Archeological excavations at the Brice House in 1998 uncovered hoodoo caches, spiritual offerings placed by African-American slaves who were house servants at the mansion.

== Description ==
The Brice House is a simplified Georgian-style mansion that relies on its elevated site along a narrow street, its scale and the mass of its brickwork to make it one of the most impressive buildings of its style in the United States. It is a five-part plantation house transplanted to an urban setting. The interiors, while Georgian in detailing, are comparatively elaborate in character.

The house is sited on a terrace overlooking East Street. The 2 1/2 story house main house is flanked by 1 1/2 story wings connected at a lower elevation to the main house by 1 1/2 story hyphens. The entire five-part ensemble rests on an elevated basement, which adds to the impression of height from the street. The hyphens and end pavilions are dormered, but the plain steep roof of the central block is uninterrupted, adding to the mass of the house. Tall, thin chimneys bookend the main block. The house is of brick construction on a fieldstone foundation, with the street (south) and garden (north) facades laid in an all-header pattern using oversized bricks.

Windows are nine-over-nine sashes on the main level and six-over-nine on the upper floor. Wood stairs reach the main doors on the north and south sides and are reconstructions based on an 1863 photograph. The south doors are original to the house and deeply recessed under a wood architrave. A unique pseudo-Palladian window is centered above the south entrance. The central block was originally roofed with cypress shingles, now replaced by non-combustible tiles.

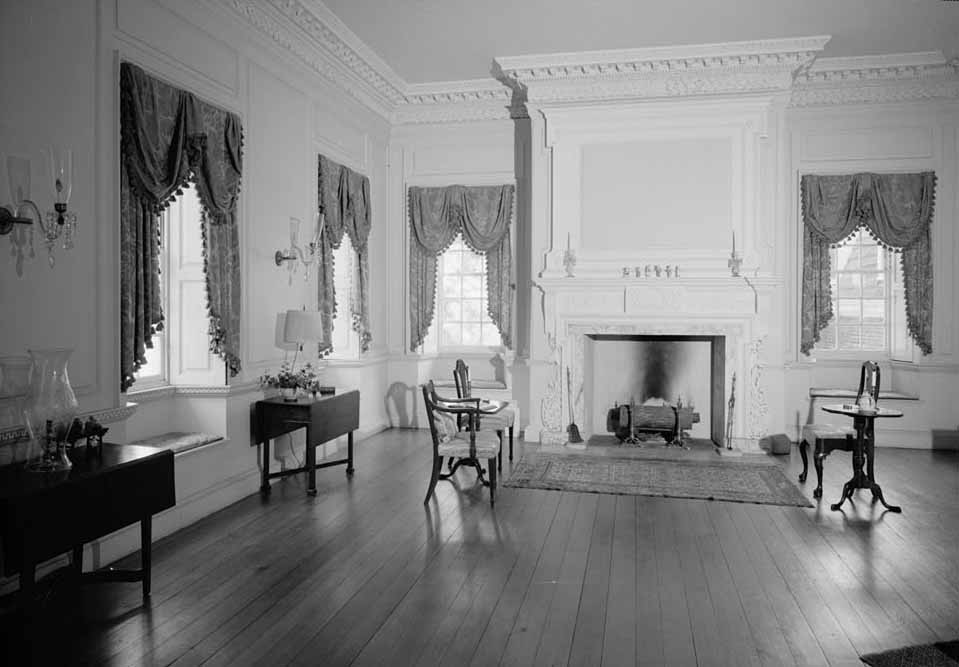
Ballroom

The interior is not symmetrical, with an offset central hallway extending halfway into the house. A parlor occupies two bays on the south side, while a ballroom occupies three bays of the north side. The ballroom is among the largest of its kind, larger and more impressive than the ballroom in the similar Hammond-Harwood House.Interior detailing is late Georgian in style. The ballroom fireplace is a direct copy of a design from Abraham Swan's stylebook British Architect of 1745. It was once considered that architect William Buckland executed these designs, but it is now thought to have been the work of William Brampton, who completed them between 1769 and 1772. The second floor comprises four bedrooms. The end pavilions contain a kitchen and servants' quarters on the east side and a carriage house on the west side, connected by a narrow passage through the hyphens, which themselves each contain two rooms.

The house is substantially original in all respects, retaining its plasterwork, glass, woodwork and flooring.

== See also ==
- Colonial families of Maryland
- Tulip Hill
- List of National Historic Landmarks in Maryland
- National Register of Historic Places listings in Anne Arundel County, Maryland

== Gallery ==
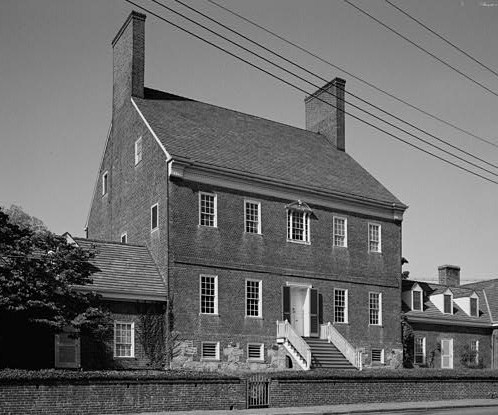
Brice House, HABS Photo, 1964
