= John Hesselius =

American artist (1728–1778)

- Born: 1728; Philadelphia
- Died: April 9, 1778 (aged 49–50)
- Known for: Painter

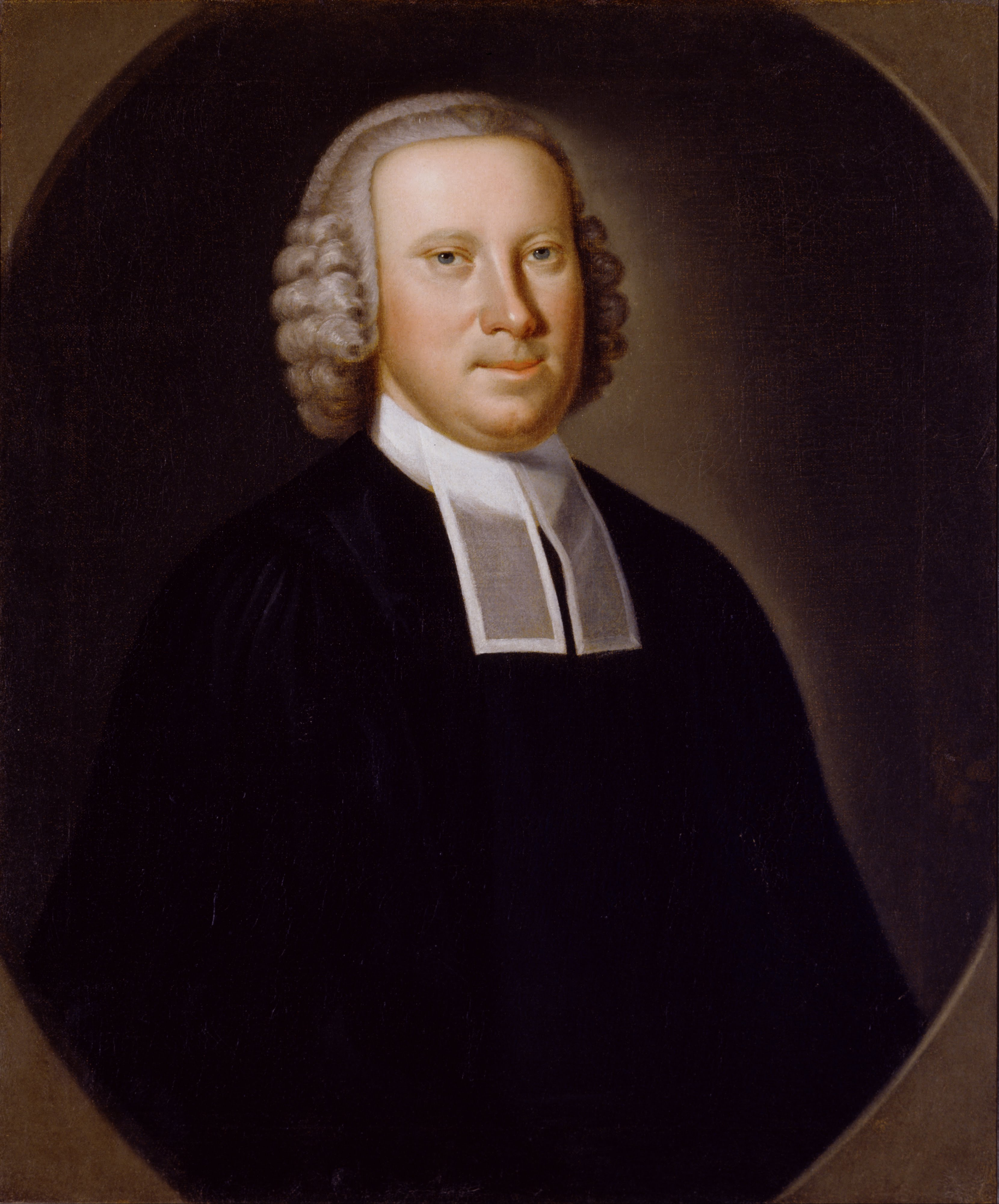
Portrait of Reverend Richard Brown by John Hesselius

John Hesselius (1728 – April 9, 1778) was an American portrait painter who worked mostly in Virginia and Maryland. He was the son of the Swedish-born portraitist Gustavus Hesselius. He painted the portraits of many wealthy politicians and planters in Colonial Maryland, making him a successful and wealthy individual; at his death in 1778 he left a substantial estate of land and slaves.

== Background ==
John Hesselius was likely born in Philadelphia, where his father owned a house to satisfy clients. Claims that he was born in Prince George's County, Maryland are unfounded, for his father Gustavus had sold his farm in the county in 1726, two years prior to John's birth. Any records of his birth would have been lost in a fire that occurred in 1740 at Gloria Dei (Old Swedes') Church in Philadelphia. In 1750 it is documented that Gustavus received two letters from his son, who was writing from the Williamsburg area. John probably set out from Philadelphia in order to escape competition from the better-known artists in the area, such as his father, James Claypoole, John Wollaston and Robert Feke.

== Career ==
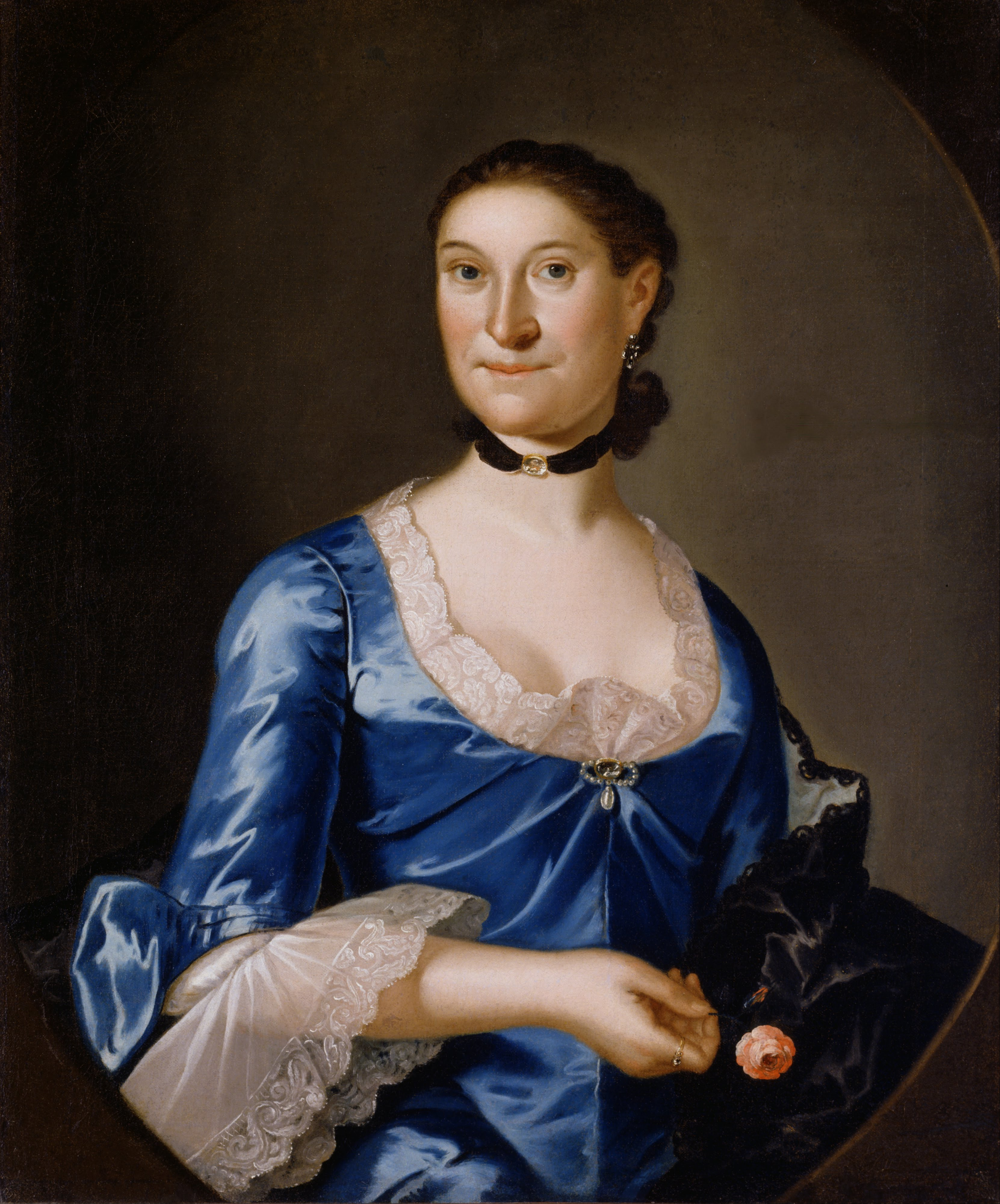
Mrs. Richard Brown, painted by John Hesselius

His earliest paintings are attributed to 1750, when he worked in the vicinities of Williamsburg and Yorktown. By the following year he had established himself as a colonial "court" painter, and painted many of the prominent families in the Chesapeake Bay area. In 1751, he made six portraits for the Fitzhughs, one of the First Families of Virginia. He eventually painted or copied five generations of the family during the two decades he worked for them. (A 1767 portrait of Sarah Fitzhugh Bland, the mother of Chancellor Theodorick Bland, is the only signed work by Hesselius for which there is a record of the value of the commission: £20 and sixteen shillings.) Also in 1751 he completed four portraits for Philadelphia judge Joshua Maddox and his family. Twelve portraits have been identified as Hesselius works for this year alone. Upon Gustavus' death in 1755, he inherited his father's house on High Street (now Market Street, Philadelphia).

He received a large commission in 1761 to paint portraits of the four children of Benedict Swingate Calvert, illegitimate son of Charles Calvert, 5th Baron Baltimore. His paintings of Charles Calvert and the twin sisters Elizabeth Calvert and Eleanor Calvert, painted in 1761, are part of the permanent collection of the Baltimore Museum of Art.

In 1762, he became the first instructor of the acclaimed artist Charles Willson Peale, "exchanging one of his best saddles with its complete furniture for three lessons in Hesselius' studio." Hesselius himself received a few lessons in the 1760s from John Wollaston, and Wollaston's style was a further influence on Hesselius' work. 1763 proved to be a busy year for John, for on January 30 he married the wealthy Annapolitan widow Mary Young Woodward, whose husband owned Primrose Hill, where he soon moved in with her. He became more involved with his local parish, St. Anne's Church in Annapolis. On April 4 that same year he signed a "Denial of Transubstantiation", and is shown on church records to be a church warden. He is also shown to have sold numerous properties throughout the Annapolis area.

Records show Hesselius to be a multi-faceted man. An inventory of his property taken for his will shows him owning 31 slaves, numerous scientific instruments including a camera obscura, microscope, three violins, a harpsichord and a guitar. His last known work was dated 1777, one year before his death on April 9, 1778.

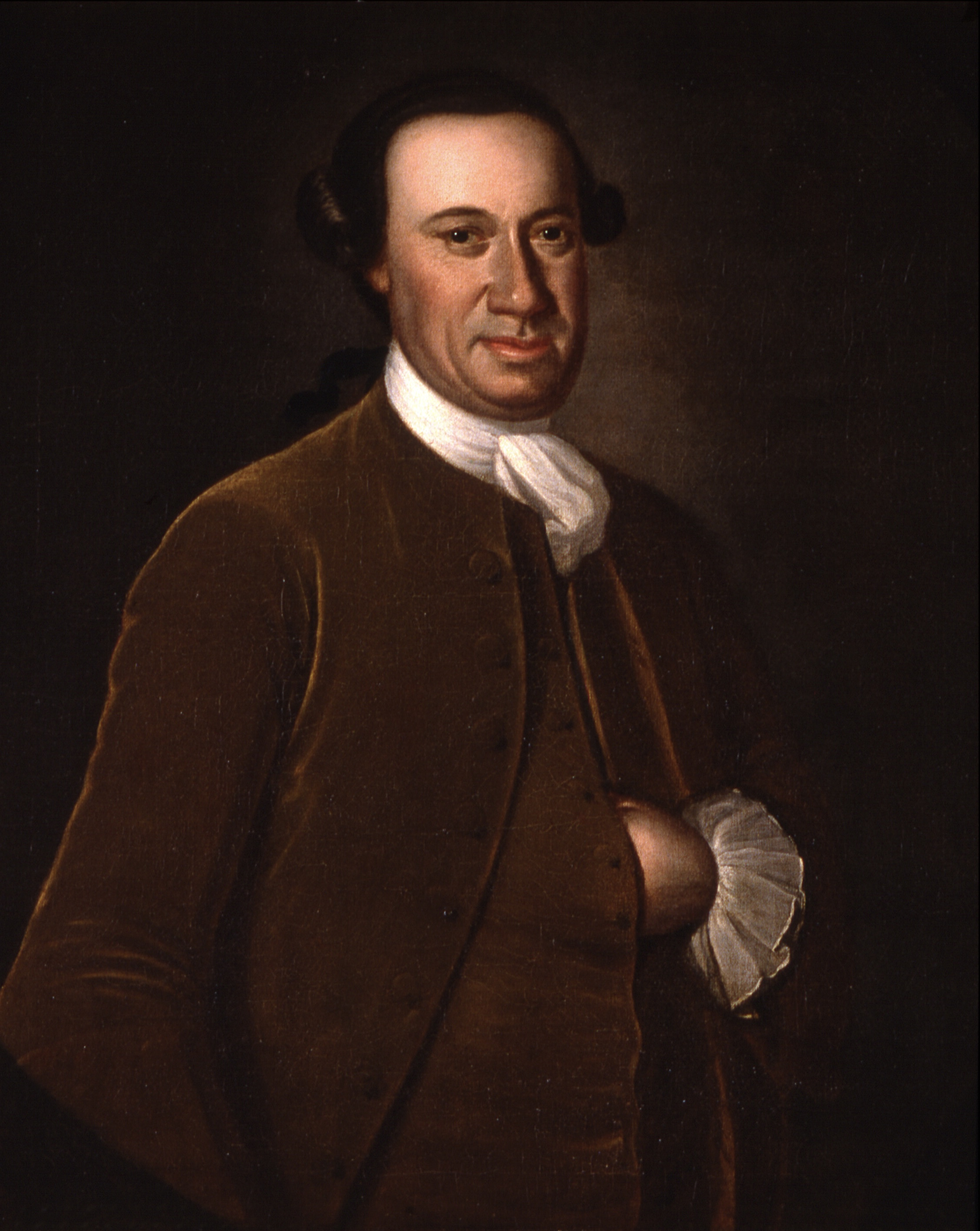
Portrait of John Hanson, first president of Congress after ratification of the Articles of Confederation. Painted by Hesselius around 1770.

A portrait of John Hanson, first President of the Continental Congress (who some consider to be the true first President of the United States), was painted by John Hesselius around 1770.

== Style ==
John Hesselius worked "exclusively in the late English Baroque and English Rococo traditions, and always used oil on canvas." Hesselius' works often lack warmth, containing generic, repetitive facial features. His early portraits show difficulty in accurately depicting human anatomy, particularly in the hands and noses of his subjects. Hesselius was heavily influenced by the works of Robert Feke, whose bright and decorative style made more of an artistic impression upon John than his father's. Elements of Feke's style are evident throughout Hesselius' works, and his meticulous attention to fabric and color makes his sitters appear elegant. He was also influenced by the work of John Wollaston, who gave him a few lessons in portraiture. The majority of colonial portraitists emulated successful painters, which therefore stifled most of the artistic development in the American Colonies. John Hesselius is an excellent example of this "borrowing" from other colonial artists. The most prominent portraitists such as John Singleton Copley or Benjamin West left America for the more developed centers of painting, namely London.

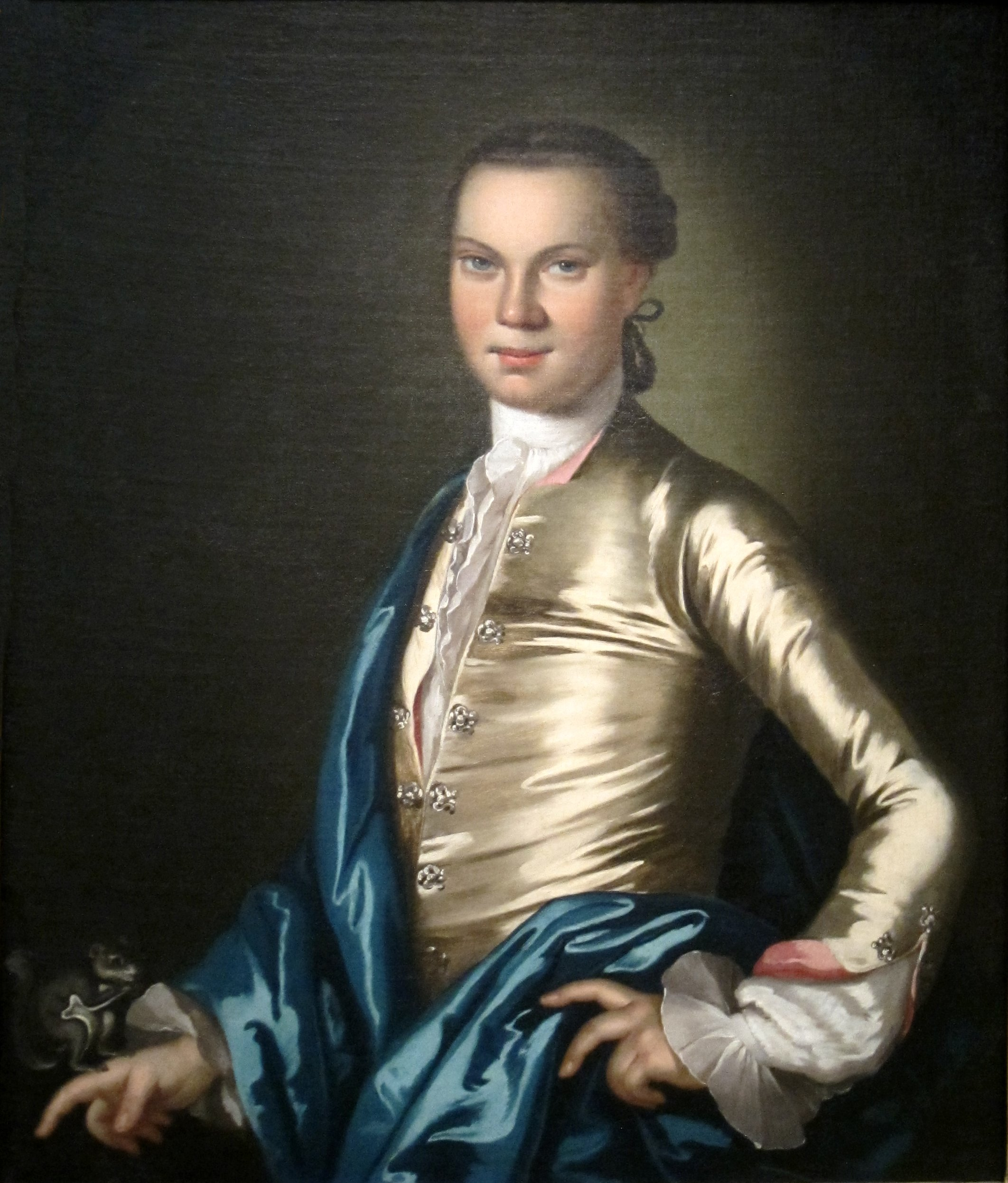
'Philip Francis' by John Hesselius, Cincinnati Art Museum

== Artworks ==
Year	Title	Image	Collection	Comments
1767	Portrait of Captain Charles Ridgely	view	Hampton National Historic Site, Hampton, Maryland	Subject: Charles Ridgely III (1733–1790).
1767	Portrait of Rebecca Dorsey Ridgely	view	Hampton National Historic Site, Hampton, Maryland	Subject: Rebecca Dorsey (1739–1812); daughter of Caleb Dorsey (iron master in Anne Arundel County, Maryland); wife of Charles Ridgely III (1733–1790).
1767	Portrait of John Carlyle	view	Carlyle House Historic Park. Alexandria, Virginia	Subject: John Carlyle (1720–1780).

== Gallery ==
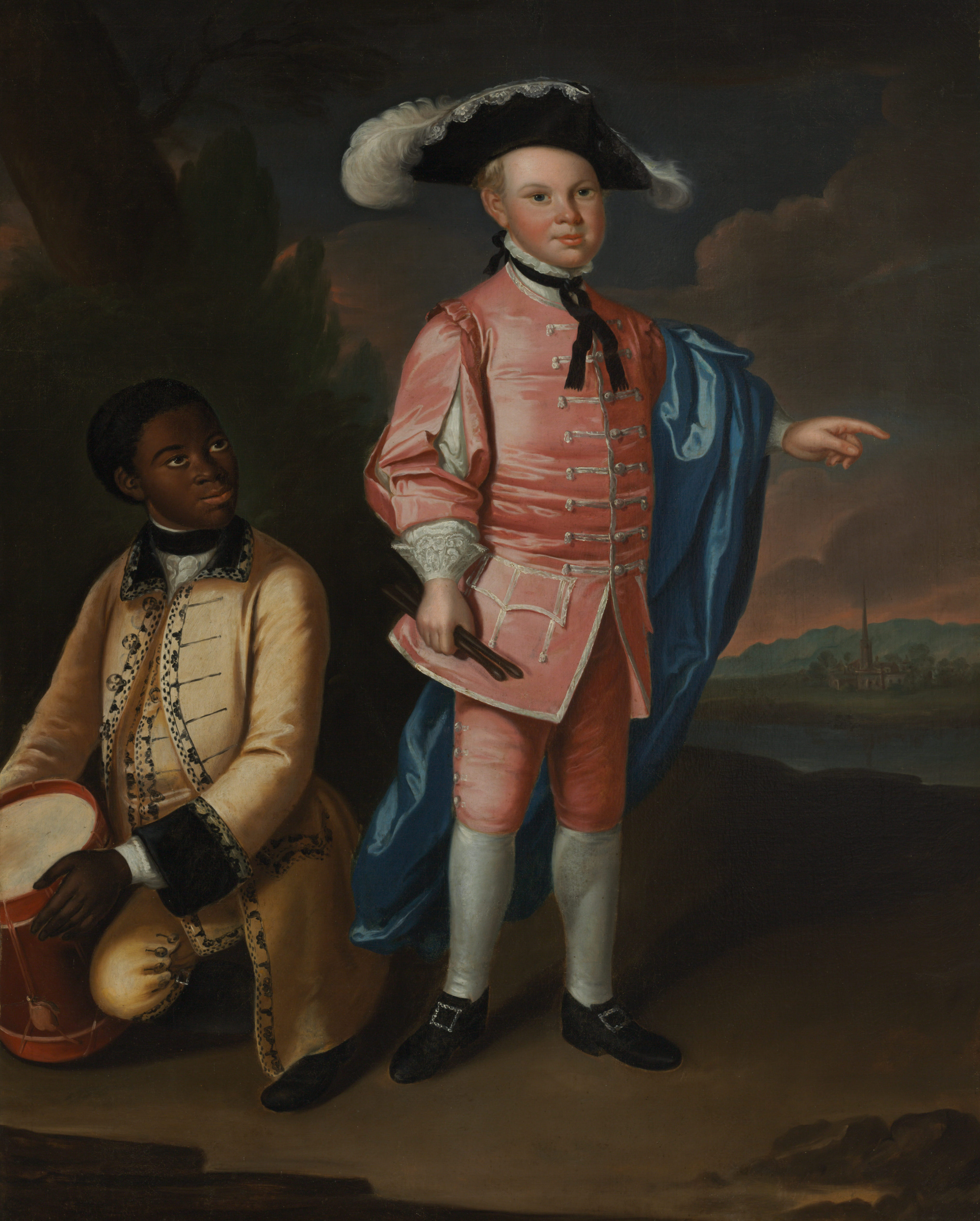
Charles Calvert and Once-Known Enslaved Attendant (1761)

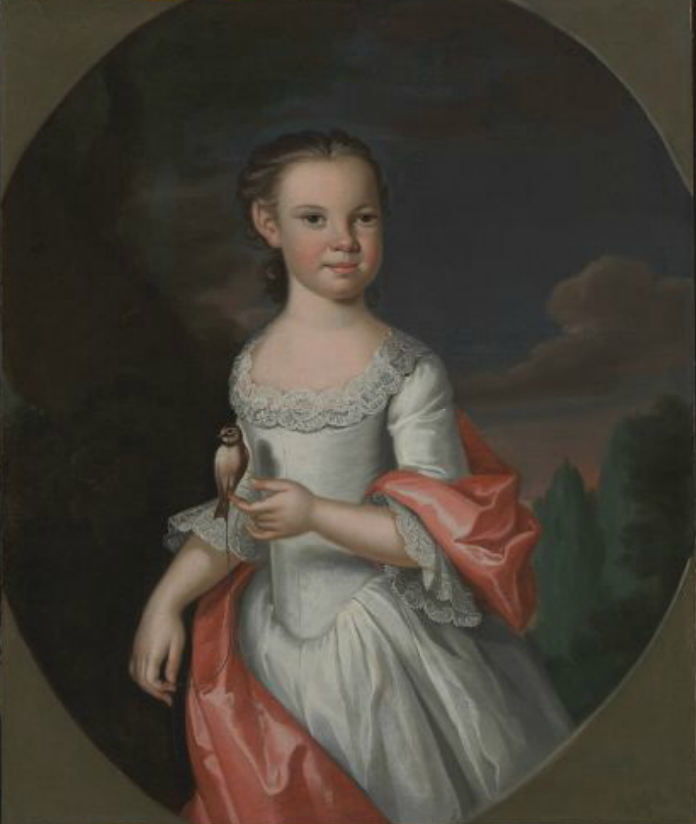
Painting of Eleanor Calvert by John Hesselius, 1728–1778, in 1761

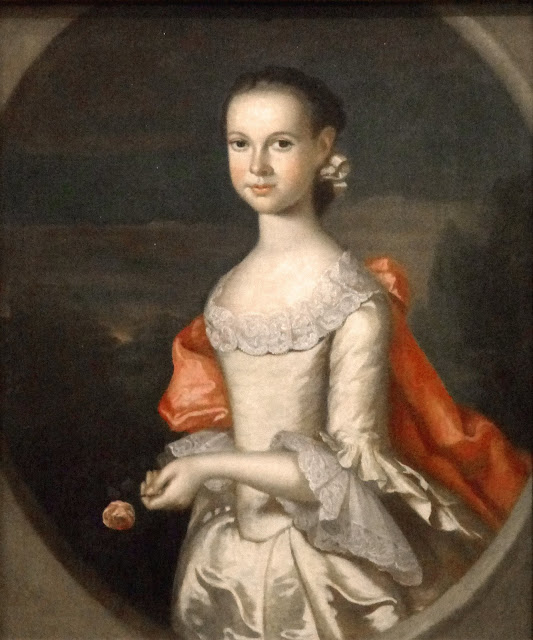
Elizabeth Calvert, daughter of Benedict Swingate Calvert, painted by John Hesselius in 1761

== Sources ==
- Doud, Richard K., John Hesselius: His Life and Work (Masters Thesis to the University of Delaware, 1963) (This is the most intensive research done on John Hesselius.)
- Doud, Richard K., John Hesselius, Maryland Limner (Winterthur Portfolio, Vol. 5, pp. 129–153. Chicago, 1969)
- Fleischer, Roland E., Three Recently Discovered Portraits by John Hesselius
- Rasmussen, William. First Fitzhughs of Virginia: A Colonial Dynasty Painted by John Hesselius <https://web.archive.org/web/20110516232553/http://www.tfaoi.com/aa/8aa/8aa362.htm>
- The Selected Papers of Charles Willson Peale and his Family 1983, p. 33

== External link ==
- Media related to John Hesselius at Wikimedia Commons
