= Eliza Ridgely =

American socialite (1803-1867)

- Lady with a Harp, portrait of Eliza Ridgely by Thomas Sully, 1818
- Born: February 10, 1803
- Died: December 20, 1867 (aged 64)
- Spouse: John Carnan Ridgely (m. 1828)
- Children: 5
- Parent(s): Nicholas Greenbury Ridgely; Elisabeth Eichelberger

Eliza Eichelberger Ridgely (February 10, 1803 – December 20, 1867) was an American heiress, traveler, arbiter of fashion, and mistress of Hampton, the Ridgely plantation north of Towson, Maryland. She is the Lady with a Harp of Thomas Sully's portrait, now in the National Gallery of Art, Washington, D.C.

== Early life ==
Eliza Ridgely was born on February 10, 1803, the only child of Nicholas Greenbury Ridgely, a rich wine merchant from Baltimore and Elisabeth (née Eichelberger) Ridgely, who married on July 30, 1801. Her mother, who was born on December 6, 1783, was the daughter of Johann Martin Eichelberger and his wife Elizabeth Welsh, and died a few hours after the birth of Eliza, aged only nineteen years and two months. Her father died in 1829 and was buried in the cemetery at Hampton.

== Life ==
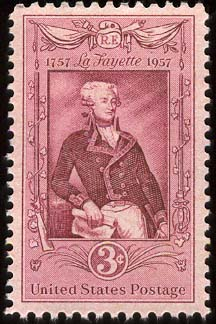
Marquis de Lafayette

Eliza Ridgely was an heiress who became a foreign traveler and an arbiter of fashion. She met and befriended the Marquis de Lafayette during his United States tour of 1824–1825 and stayed in contact with him for the rest of his life. Ten of his letters to her have survived, including an invitation to visit La Grange, his country estate in France—a visit which took place in 1834—and his congratulations on her marriage. A number of Eliza's replies and related correspondence––including the news that she was, at long last, going to visit La Grange in 1833––were discovered and published in 2019.

=== Personal life ===
On January 8, 1828, Eliza Ridgely married John Carnan Ridgely. He was the son of Charles Carnan Ridgely who served as Governor of the state of Maryland from 1815 to 1818. Her husband was the grandson of John Carnan and Achsah (née Ridgely) Carnan. John's great-uncle and Achsah's brother, Charles Ridgely III, was the builder of the Hampton plantation which was built in 1790 and had been the largest private residence in the United States. He was childless and as he approached the end of his life, willed that his sister's progeny should take the Ridgely name and in doing, would inherit his vast estates. Thus, John Carnan Ridgely was, in fact, a fifth cousin of his wife, Eliza Eichelberger Ridgely.

When her husband's father died in July 1829, his estate of some 25,000 acres (100 km^{2}) was divided, her husband John inherited the main house and 4,500 acres (18 km^{2}). Eliza thus became the third mistress of Hampton. Together, Eliza and John were the parents of five children:

- Eliza Ridgely (1828–1894), who married firstly John Campbell White (1825–1853) in 1849, becoming the mother of the diplomat Henry White. After his death, she married Dr. Thomas Hepburn Buckler (1812–1901) in 1865.
- Priscilla Ridgely (b. 1831)
- Nicholas Greenbury Ridgely (b. 1834)
- Charles Ridgely (1838–1872), who married Margaretta Sophia Howard (1824–1904) in 1851.
- Julia Maria Ridgely (b. 1841)

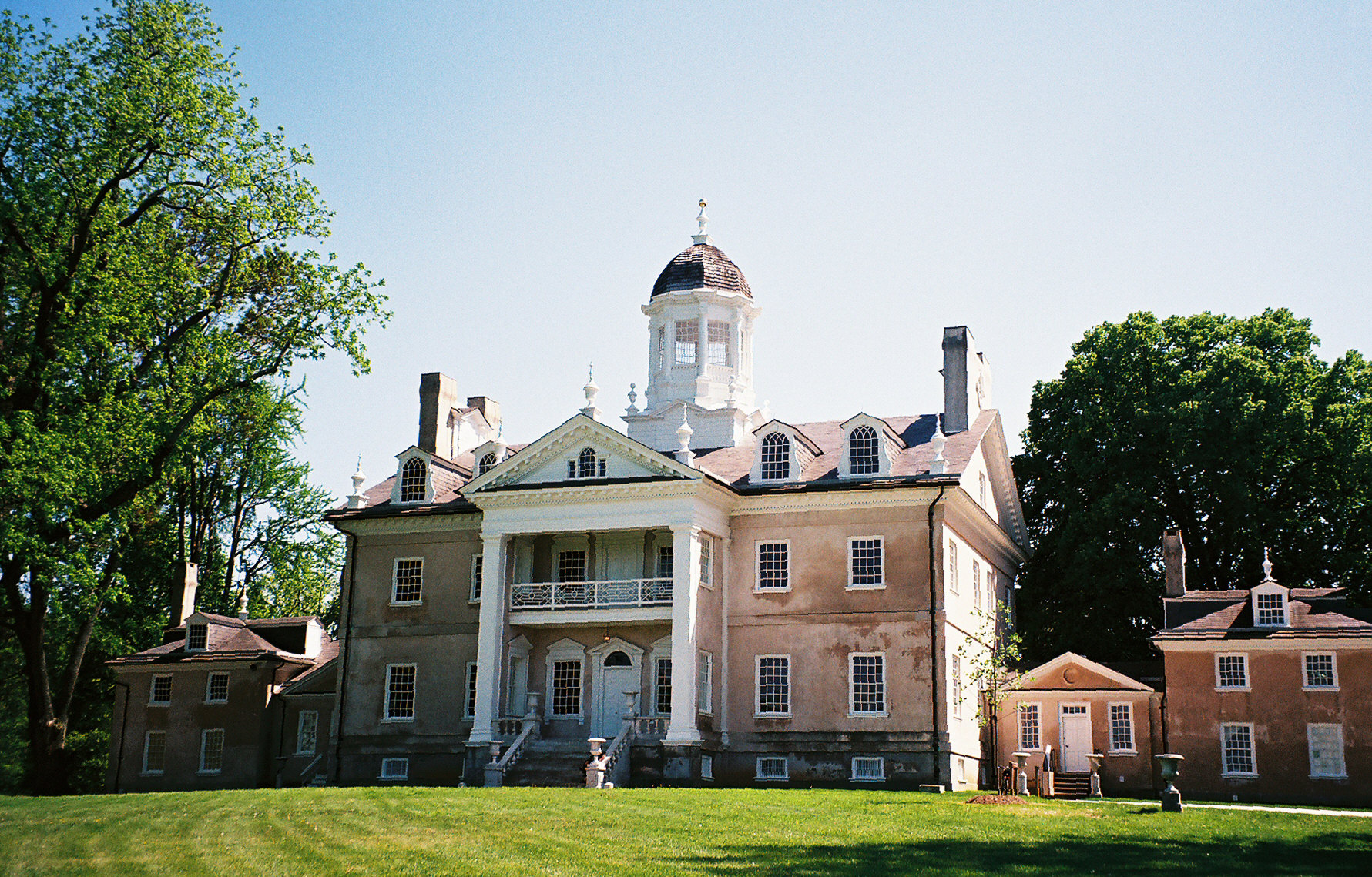
Hampton Mansion

Eliza Ridgely had a serious approach to financial affairs. The daughter of a merchant, she had married into a family which recorded the smallest transaction, and she kept careful accounts of all her expenditure, even noting the nine and a half cents she paid for a piece of ribbon. As well as her personal spending, her accounts also show her expenses in ensuring that the Hampton slaves were clothed and shod, a major undertaking. She also recorded her subscriptions, such as those to the Baltimore Humane Impartial Society from 1849 to 1854 and her donations to a Widows Asylum between 1849 and 1851.

Eliza Ridgely ordered church services for her slaves in the attic of the Hampton carriage house. The services were taken by a white minister, Mr Galbraith, until he was dismissed for marrying a woman believed to have African blood. Ridgely herself oversaw funerals and weddings in the house's great hall. One of Ridgely's grandsons, the diplomat Henry White, recalled that she "was very particular in having what she was pleased to describe (and which I then believed to be) 'marriages', performed by a clergyman, between the negro servants, when so inclined: not realizing – certainly I did not at the time – that slaves were unable to perform any civil act, being mere chattels". Ridgely's daughter Eliza recorded having taught a group of slave children the Lord's Prayer.

Eliza Ridgely was an avid gardener, and in the 1830s and 1840s she improved the gardens and enhanced the landscape at Hampton, planting exotic trees such as the Lebanon Cedar which still stands on the house's south lawn. She is said to have brought this herself as a seedling from Europe, carrying it in a shoebox. She and her husband bought furniture for the house which reflected the classical influences already indulged there. In 1839, the landscape gardener Henry Winthrop Sargent found that Hampton's venerable appearance and foreign air "...quite disturb one's ideas of republican America".

== Lady with a Harp ==
Thomas Sully's painting Lady with a Harp (pictured) is a portrait of Eliza Ridgely done in 1818, when she was only fifteen, showing her wearing an Empire satin gown with a draped shawl as she plucks the strings of a pedal harp. It was commissioned by her father, Nicholas Greenbury Ridgely, who at the same time was himself painted by Sully. Eliza really did play the harp, and her surviving bills and receipts include those for music lessons and for the repair of her harp in the years 1820 to 1826. Whether her arms were as long and her figure as slender as they were painted is uncertain. Sully later commented on all his work "From long experience, I know that resemblance in a portrait is essential; but no fault will be found with the artist (at least by the sitter) if he improve the appearance."

The painting was kept at Hampton from the 1820s until 1945, when it was sold to the National Gallery of Art. After David Finley, director of the gallery, had acquired Lady with a Harp he became an advocate for the preservation of Hampton. He helped to arrange a deal under which the Ridgelys sold the house to Ailsa Mellon Bruce's Avalon Foundation, which in 1948 gave it to the National Park Service.

There is now a copy of the painting at Hampton.

== Surviving papers of Eliza Ridgely ==
A number of financial records kept by Eliza Ridgely have been preserved:

- Account book of expenses on trip to Europe (1833–1834)
- Servants Clothing Book, (1835–1854)
- Account Book (1838–1846)
- Accounts of Eliza E. R. Ridgely with her Trustees for her father's estate (1840s)
- House Accounts (1845)
- Accounts of Eliza E. R. Ridgely with her Trustees for Nicholas G. Ridgely's estate (1840s)
- Travel Account Book (1846–1847)
- Account Books (1849–1853)
- John & Eliza Ridgely, Farm Account Book (1850–1864)
- Account Book as Trustee to Nicholas G. Ridgely (1858–1867)

Other surviving manuscripts include letters Eliza Ridgely wrote to her daughter Eliza (known as 'Didy') between May 8 and July 12, 1858, a commonplace book of poetry she kept before her marriage, and letters she wrote and received from her friend Lafayette, her son Charles at Harvard and her daughter Eliza traveling in Europe.

== Bibliography ==
- Considine, Basil, 'Letters to a Marquis: New Documentary Findings in the Correspondence of Eliza Eichelberger Ridgely of Hampton and the Marquis de Lafayette' in Maryland Historical Magazine 114, no. 1 (Spring/Summer 2019) pp. 43–78
- Considine, Basil and Elissa Edwards, 'Eliza Ridgely (1803–1867): Kind of a Badass. How the 'It Girl' of Antebellum America Shattered Stereotypes of Female Accomplishment in the United States' Society for American Music, Digital Lectures in American Music Series. https://www.youtube.com/watch?v=kSsa1taLxik
- Miller, Beth L., 'The Ridgelys of Hampton: New Perspectives on Musical Life in Early-Nineteenth-Century Baltimore' in Journal of Musicological Research 14 (1994) pp. 35–54
- Shipe, Bess Paterson, 'Eliza Eichelberger Ridgely, The Lady with a Harp', in Maryland Historical Magazine 77, no. 3 (Fall 1982) pp. 230–237
- Torcia, Robert Wilson, 'Eliza Ridgely and the Ideal of American Womanhood, 1787-1820' in Maryland Historical Magazine 90, no. 4 (Winter 1995) pp. 405–423
