= Washington Jockey Club =

Former American horse racing club

The Washington Jockey Club
- Type: Non-profit organisation
- Industry: Horse racing
- Founded: 1798
- Headquarters: Washington DC
- Key people: John Tayloe III; Charles Carnan Ridgely
- Products: Betting, lottery, sports

The Washington Jockey Club was an American association in Washington, D.C. devoted to horse racing, founded in 1797. The club established its first racecourse four blocks from the Executive Mansion where it extended from 17th and 20th Streets and extending across Pennsylvania Avenue into Lafayette Park, what is now the site of Decatur House at H Street and Jackson Place, crossing Seventeenth Street and Pennsylvania Avenue to Twentieth Street, largely on the site of today’s Eisenhower Executive Office Building. The course was relocated in 1802 to the Holmead Farm two miles north of the Executive Mansion, to what is now Meridian Hill.

== History ==
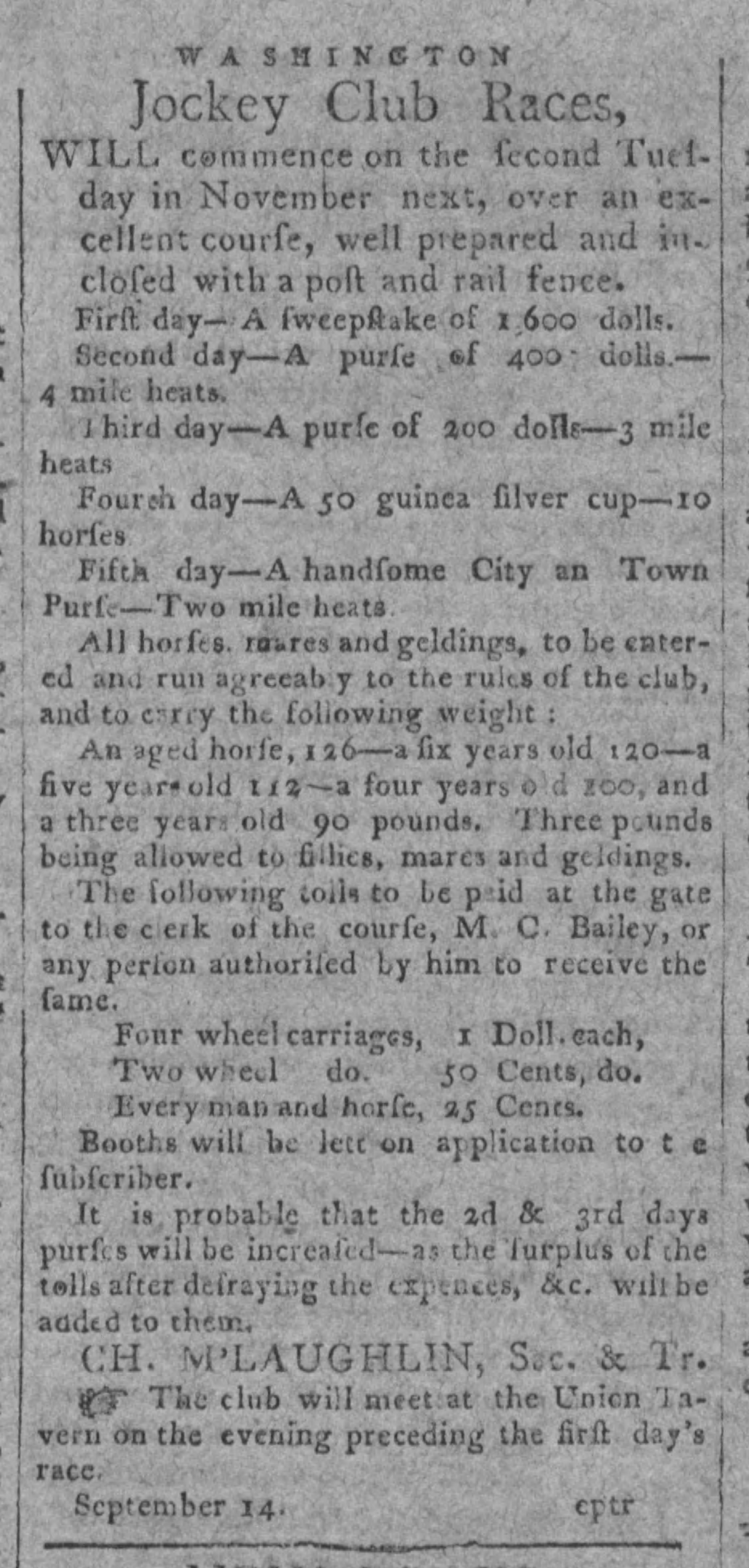
Washington DC Jockey Club Fall 1803 The National Intelligencer and Washington Advertiser Mon Oct 3 1803

=== 1798 ===
The inaugural match featured John Tayloe III's Lamplighter and Gen. Charles Carnan Ridgely's Cincinnatus, for 500 guineas, ran in 4-mile heats, and won by the former, a sire of Ridgeley's Imp English bred stallion Grey Medley. The only initial building was a small elevated platform for the judges. The "carriage folk" took to the infield for views of the contests, and the standing spectators crested the outside of the course.

Charles Ridgely raised thoroughbred horses which trained on the racetrack at his estate, Hampton. He promoted the stud services of his racehorse Grey Medley (f. 1776); his racehorse Post Boy (f. 1800) was destined to win the prestigious Washington Jockey Club cup in 1804, 1805, and 1806. John Tayloe III purchased and bred many thoroughbreds, including Diomed (f.1777) Grey Diomed (f. 1786), Dungannon (f. 1794), Selima (f. 1805), and Sir Archy (f. 1805)- considered the first great racehorse bred in America. Tayloe III built The Octagon House in downtown Washington City at the behest of his cousin, George Washington, and also owned a 204-acre horse farm called Petworth (Washington, D.C.), which stands on the land that now comprises the Petworth neighborhood. Wilhelmus Bryan, a historian of early Washington, attributed the popularity of horse racing in the new federal city "to the interest taken in breeding of racing stock by John Tayloe III, reputed to be the wealthiest man in the city.

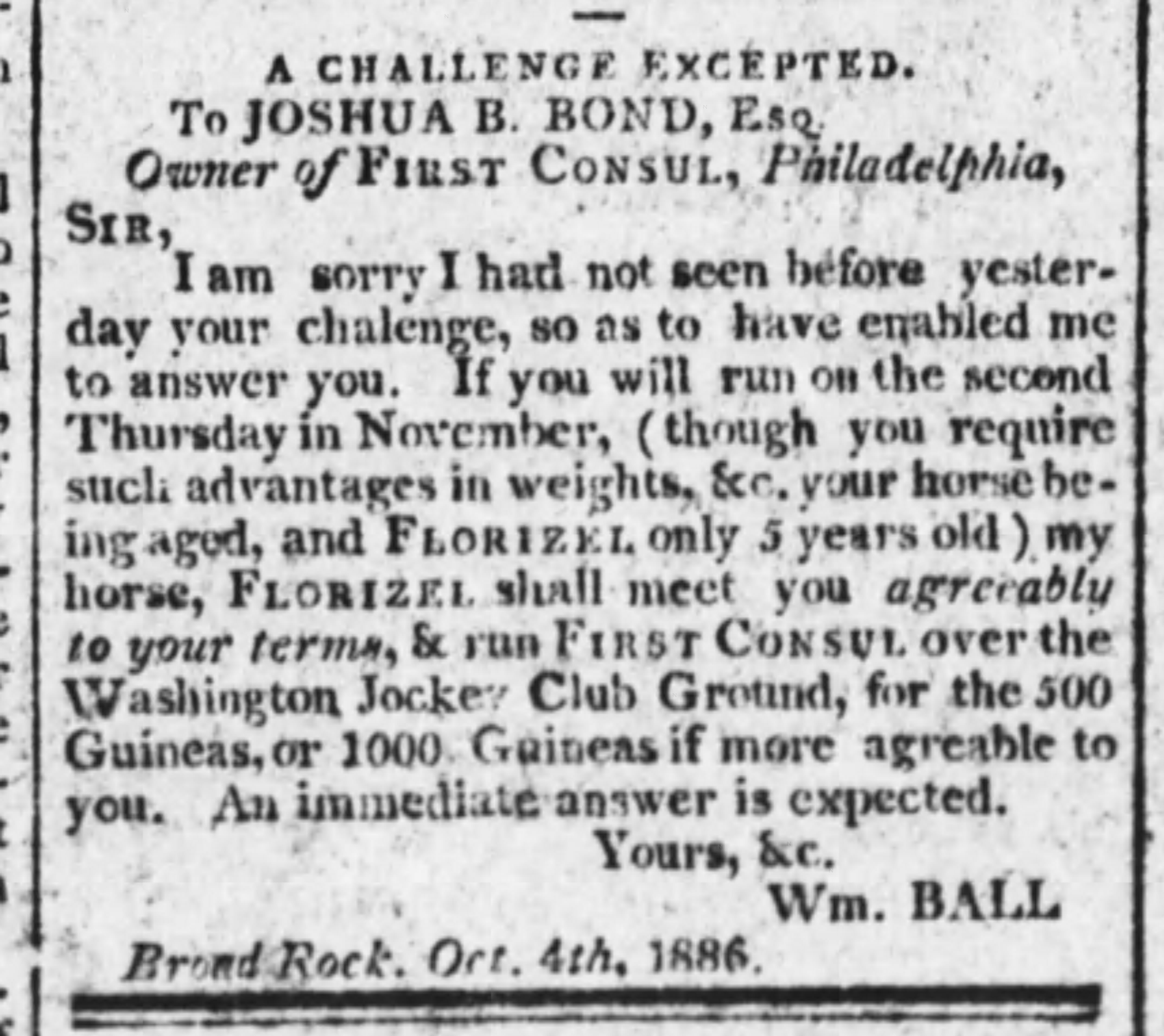
Washington Jockey Club Race Challenge The Evening Post Mon Oct 13 1806

John Tayloe II (1721-1779), father of John Tayloe III, was a fourth generation tobacco planter and avid horse racer. His property, Mount Airy (1758), exists today, Tayloe II’s earliest recorded importation was Childers (whose grandsire was Flying Childers (1714–41)) in 1751. His son, Colonel John Tayloe III, went on to purchase and breed many thoroughbreds, including Grey Diomed (f. 1786), Dungannon (f. 1794), Selima (f. 1805), and Sir Archy (f. 1805). John Tayloe III built the Octagon in the Federal City, and also owned a 204 acre horse farm called Petworth, bounded on the south by Rock Creek Road and on the west by Georgia Avenue, which stood on the land that now comprises the Petworth neighborhood. The eager citizens who attended the four mile heat interpreted the race as a contest between the states; in this instance, Virginia was victorious and Tayloe carried home a purse of 500 guineas! first and foremost a horse farm.

In 1802 growth in the Federal City forced abandonment of the initial course, moving to the Holmead Farm, what is now Meridian Hill—south of Columbia Road between Fourteenth and Sixteenth Streets—and races were conducted at the Holmstead Farm's one mile oval track. Gen. John Peter Van Ness, Dr. William Thornton, G.W. P. Custis, John Threlkeld of Georgetown and George Calvert of Riversdale, Bladensburg, Maryland.

Nowhere else could there be seen so brilliant an ensemble, so rich in glow and color, so distinguished, so picturesque, so various and so vivid. The two men most largely responsible for this were the same pair that in 1798 had provided Washington with its first big turf event: John Tayloe III and General Ridgely. . . . When he [Tayloe] withdrew from the turf in 1810, Ridgely, hitherto his rival, succeeded him as its dictator along the Potomac, the Patapsco and the Chesapeake.

For a time Washington and Baltimore were leading centers for racing, and like today the best horses raced in the spring and fall. Presidents, military heroes, statesmen, and foreign dignitaries typically attended.

=== 1803 ===
Winter Races commenced on the second Tuesday of November. The First Day was a $1,600 Sweepstakes, and the Second Day, Wednesday, was a Purse of $400, 4 Mile Heats. The Third Day, Thursday, $200 Purse, 3 Mile Heats, and the Fourth Day, Friday, "A 50 guinea silver cup-10 horses." Fifth Day, Saturday, "a handsome City an Town Purse-2 Mile Heats."

"All horses, mares, and geldings, to be entered and run agreeably to the rules of the club, and to carry the following weight: An aged horse, 126-a fix-year-old 120-a five year old 112-a four-year-old 100-and a three-year-old 90 pounds. Three pounds being allowed to fillies, mares, and geldings. The following tolls to be paid at the gate to the clerk of the courte, M.C.Bailey, or any person authorized by him to receive the same. Four Wheel Carriages, $1 doll. each, two-wheel carriages, 50c. each, two man and horse, 25c, booths to be lett on application to the subscriber. It is probable that the 2nd & 3rd days purses will be increased-as the surplus of the tolls after defraying the expenses & c. will be added to them. CHAS. MCLAUGHLIN Sec. & Tr. The club will meet at Union Tavern on the evening preceding the first day's race. Pub. Sept 14

== Gallery ==
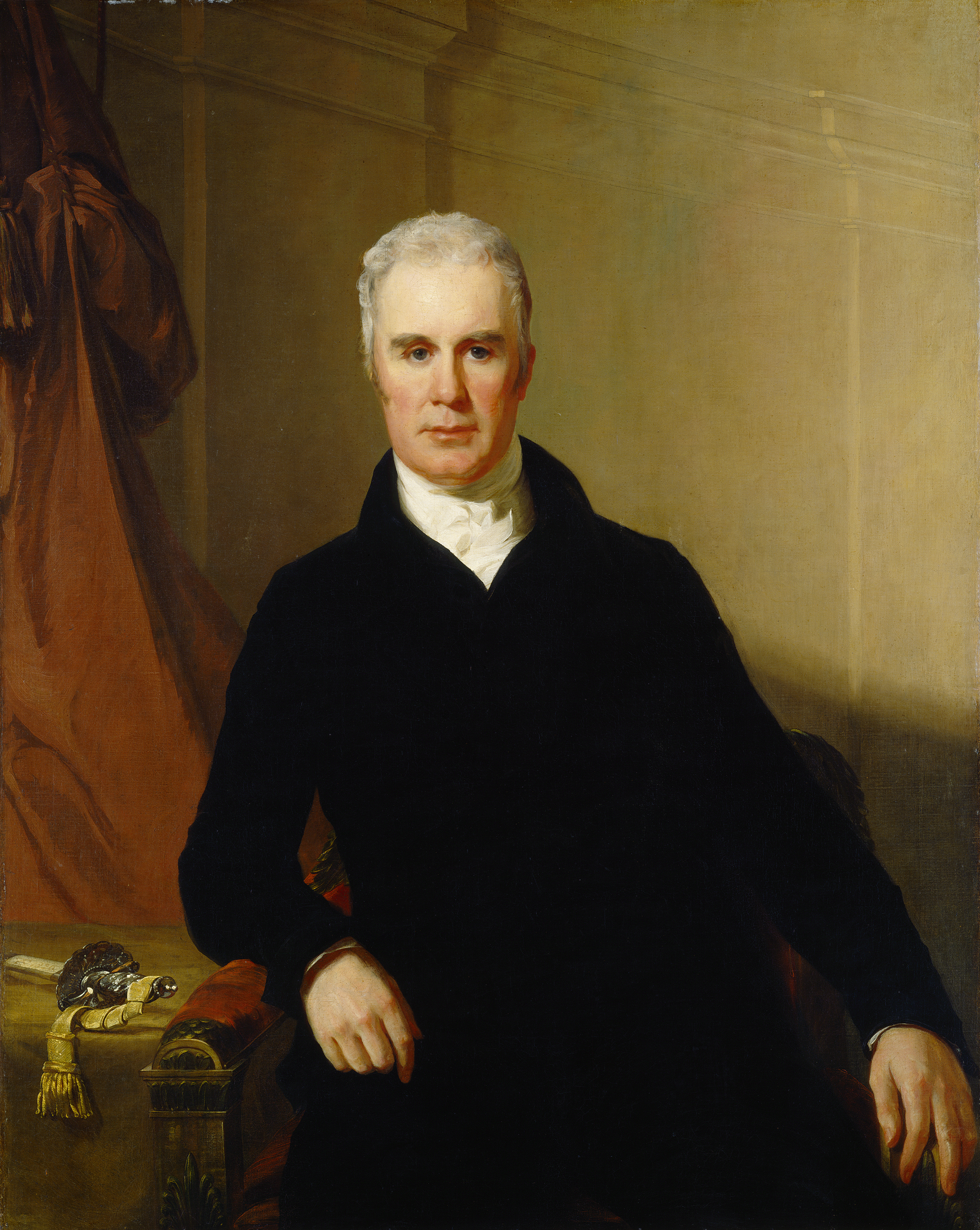
Charles Carnan Ridgely of Hampton by Florence MacKubin

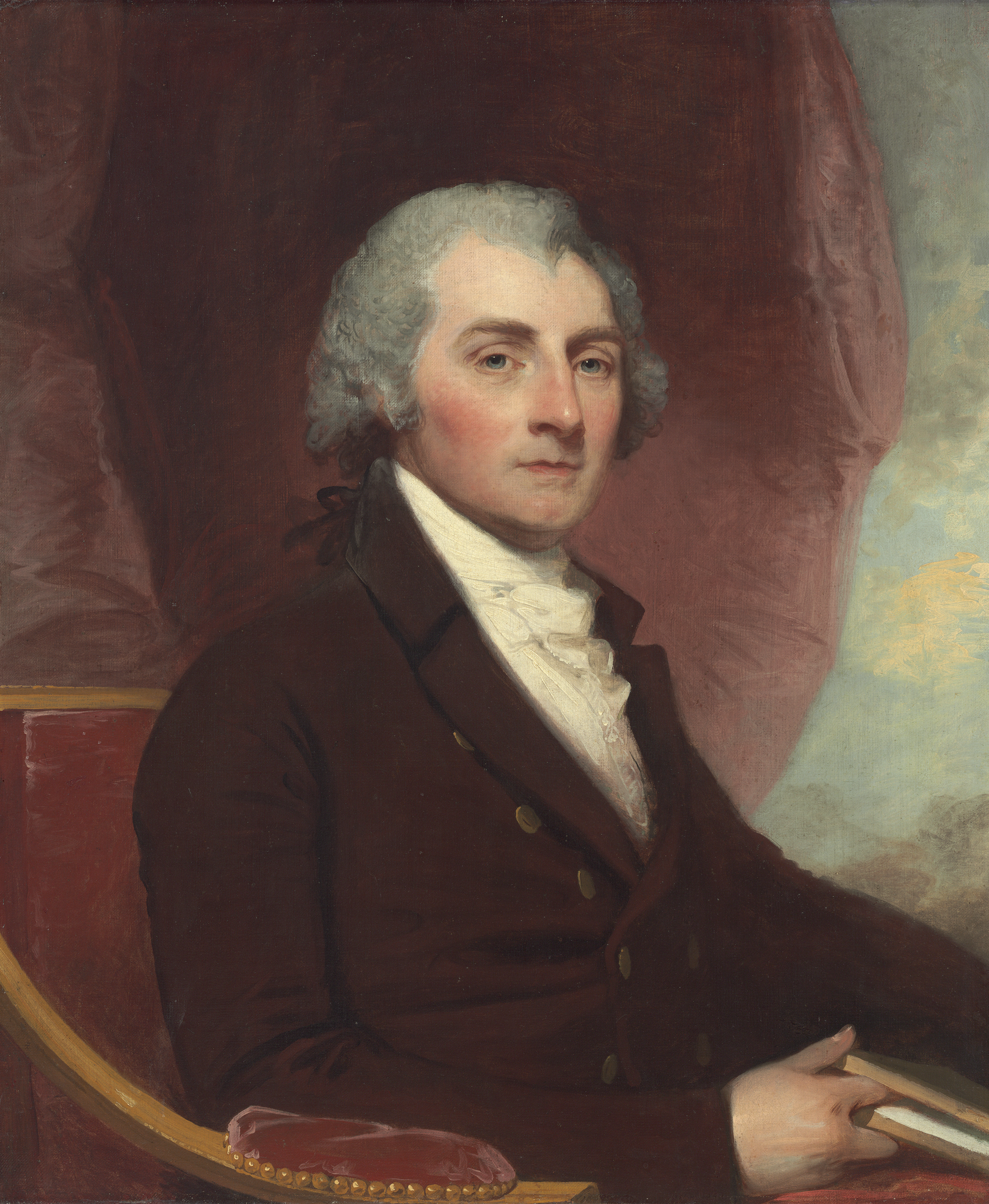
William Thornton by Gilbert Stuart

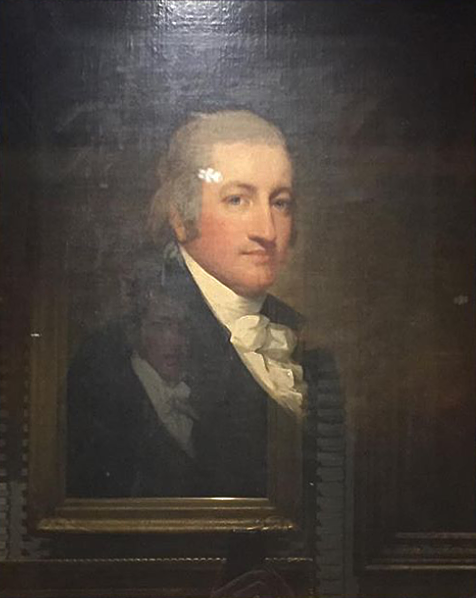
John Tayloe III by Gilbert Stuart

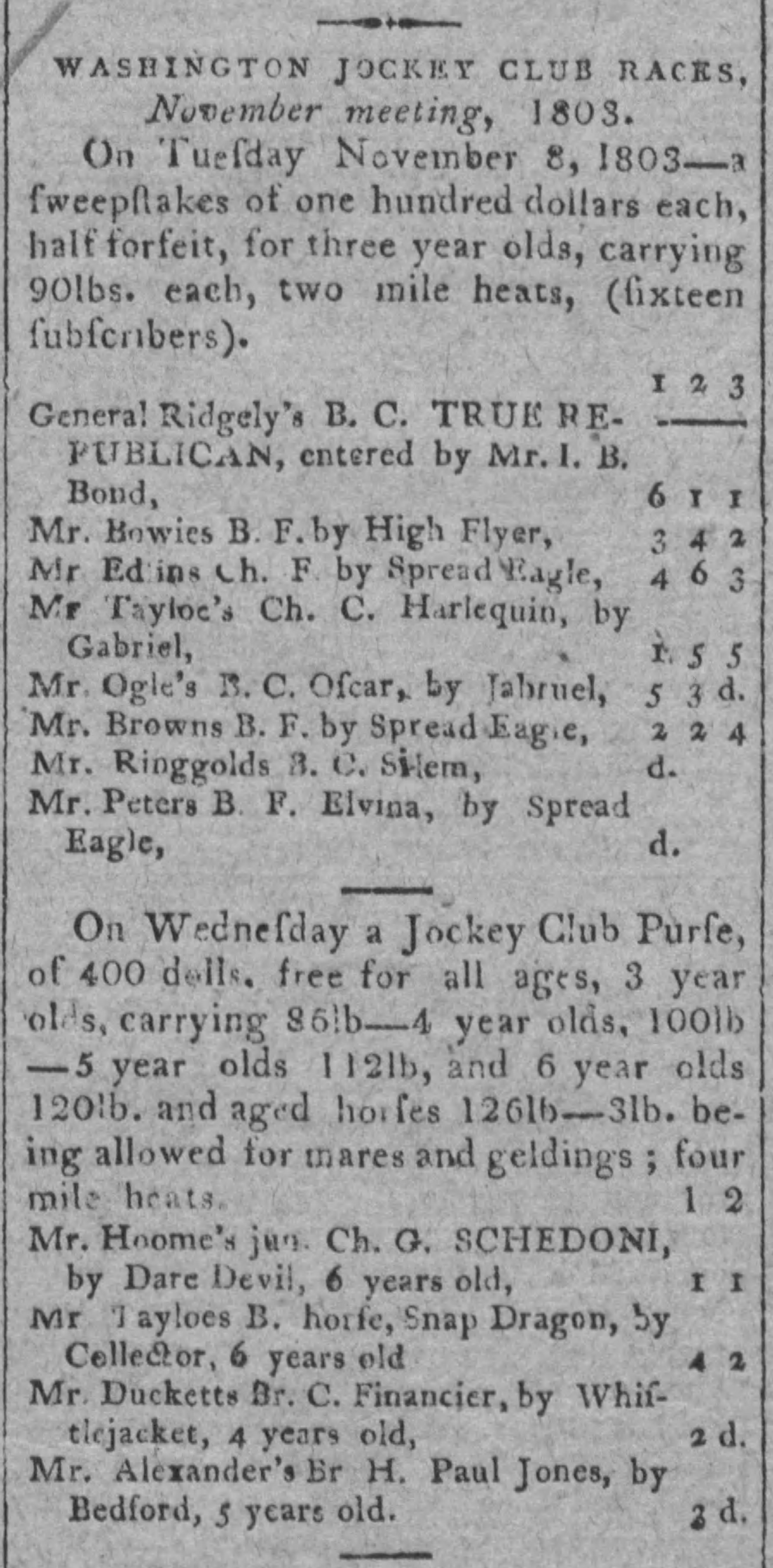
Washington Jockey Club Results Winter 1803 The National Intelligencer and Washington Advertiser Fri Nov 18 1803

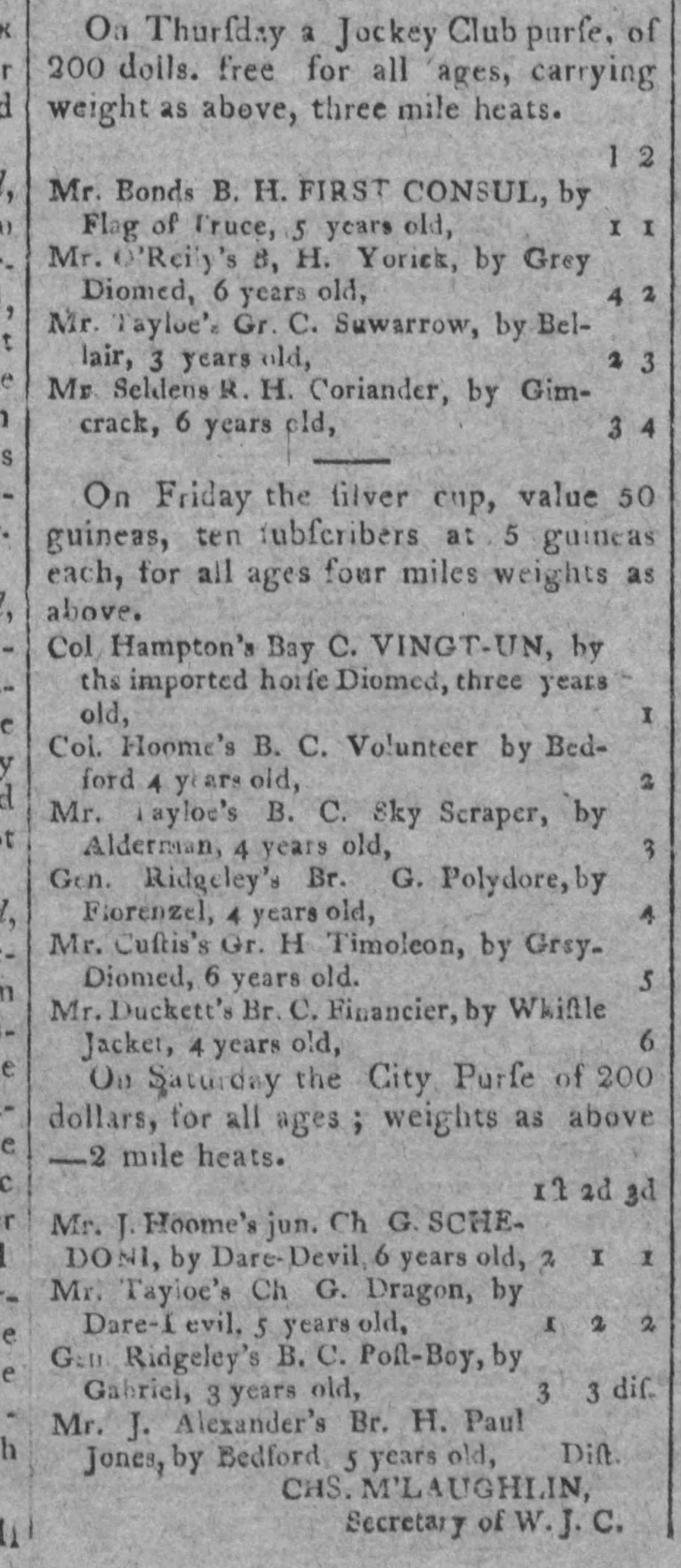
Washington Jockey Club Results Winter 1803 The National Intelligencer and Washington Advertiser Fri Nov 18 1803
