= Primrose Hill (Annapolis, Maryland) =

Historic house in Maryland, United States

- U.S. National Register of Historic Places
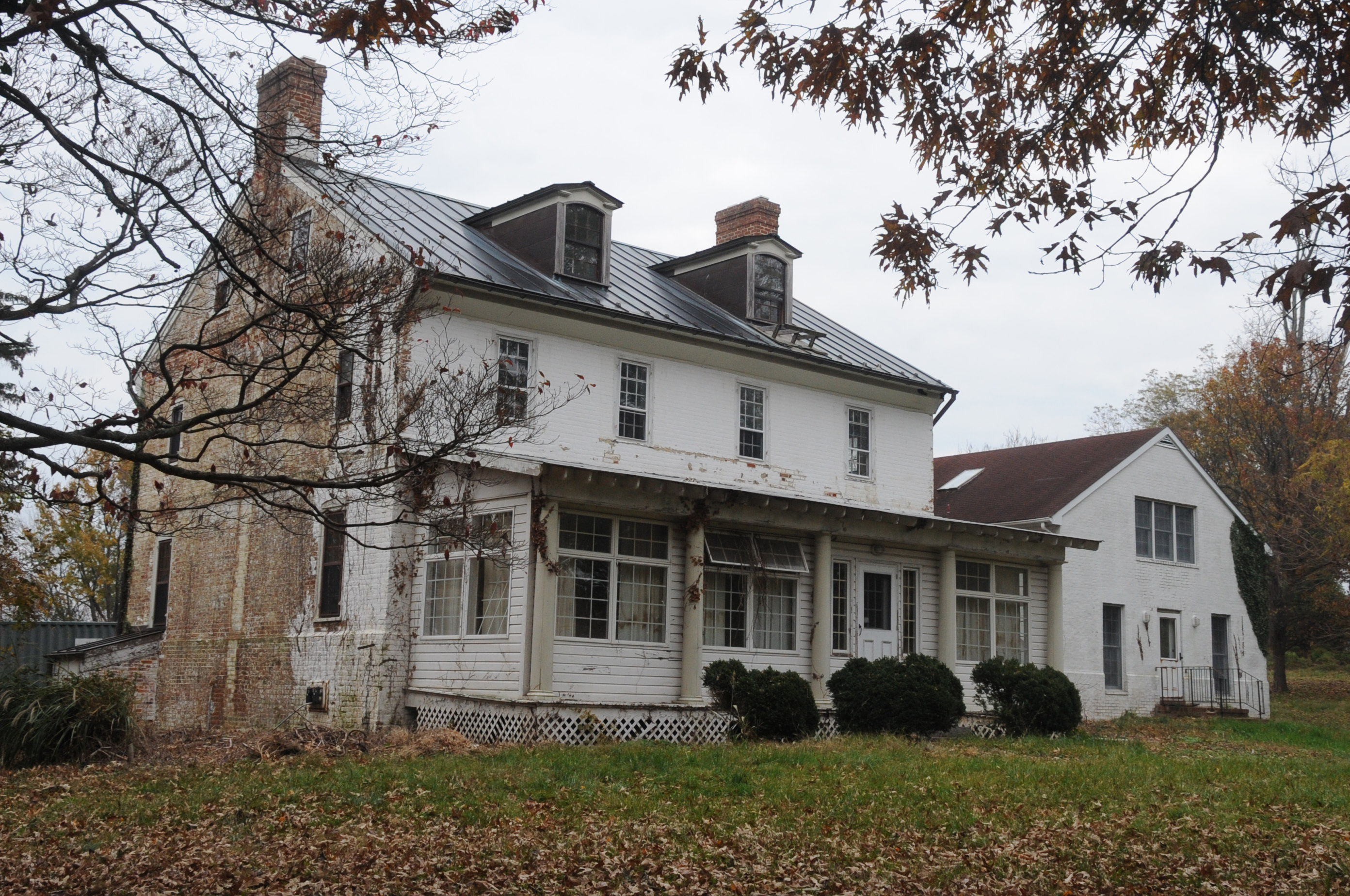

- Location within Maryland Location within the United States
- Location: 3 Milkshake Ln., Annapolis, Maryland
- Coordinates: 38°57′37″N 76°30′11″W
- Architectural style: Colonial, Georgian
- NRHP reference No.: 00001034
- Added to NRHP: September 14, 2000

Primrose Hill is a historic home at 3 Milkshake Lane in Annapolis, Anne Arundel County, Maryland. It is a 2 1/2-story, four-bay, double-pile brick house with interior end chimneys. It is of mid-18th-century Georgian design and construction, and the property is historically important with its direct association to the American portraitist, John Hesselius (1728–1778), who resided in this house between about 1763 and his death.

It was listed on the National Register of Historic Places in 2000.

Over the course of time and many owners, and notably with the dedication of Truxtun Park, the once 656-acre property associated with the historic home decreased to approximately 4.5 acres in size. The remaining plot was sold in 2014 to a private developer, after which the historic home was restored to architectural period-correctness. The residence, with a new address of 50 Primrose Hill Lane, was resold in May 2018 and is part of a newly formed Homeowners Association, along with 25 new homes; Craftmark Homes is building the new community, called simply Primrose Hill.

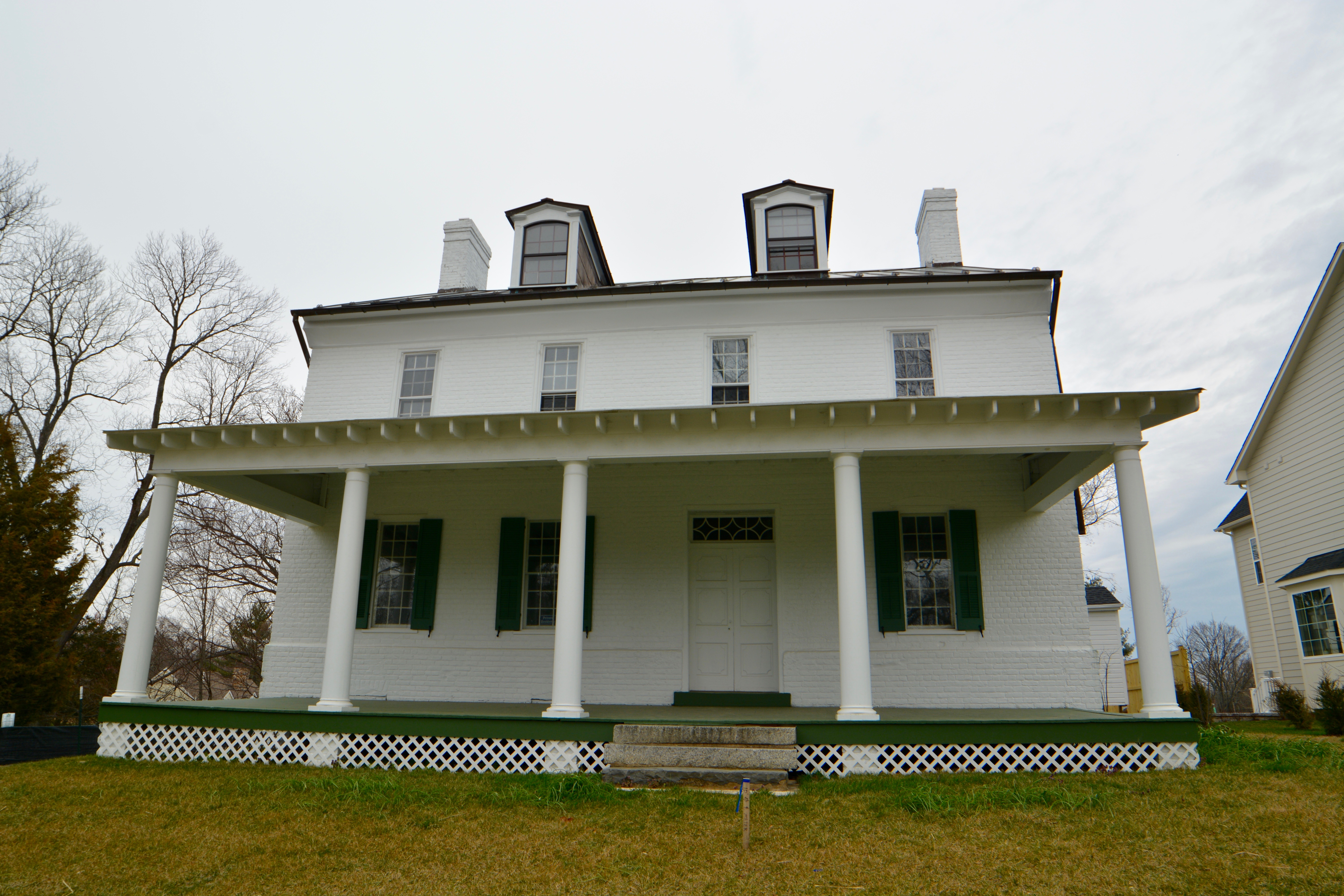
The restored exterior of the Historic House at Primrose Hill
