= Charles Carnan Ridgely =

American politician (1760-1829)

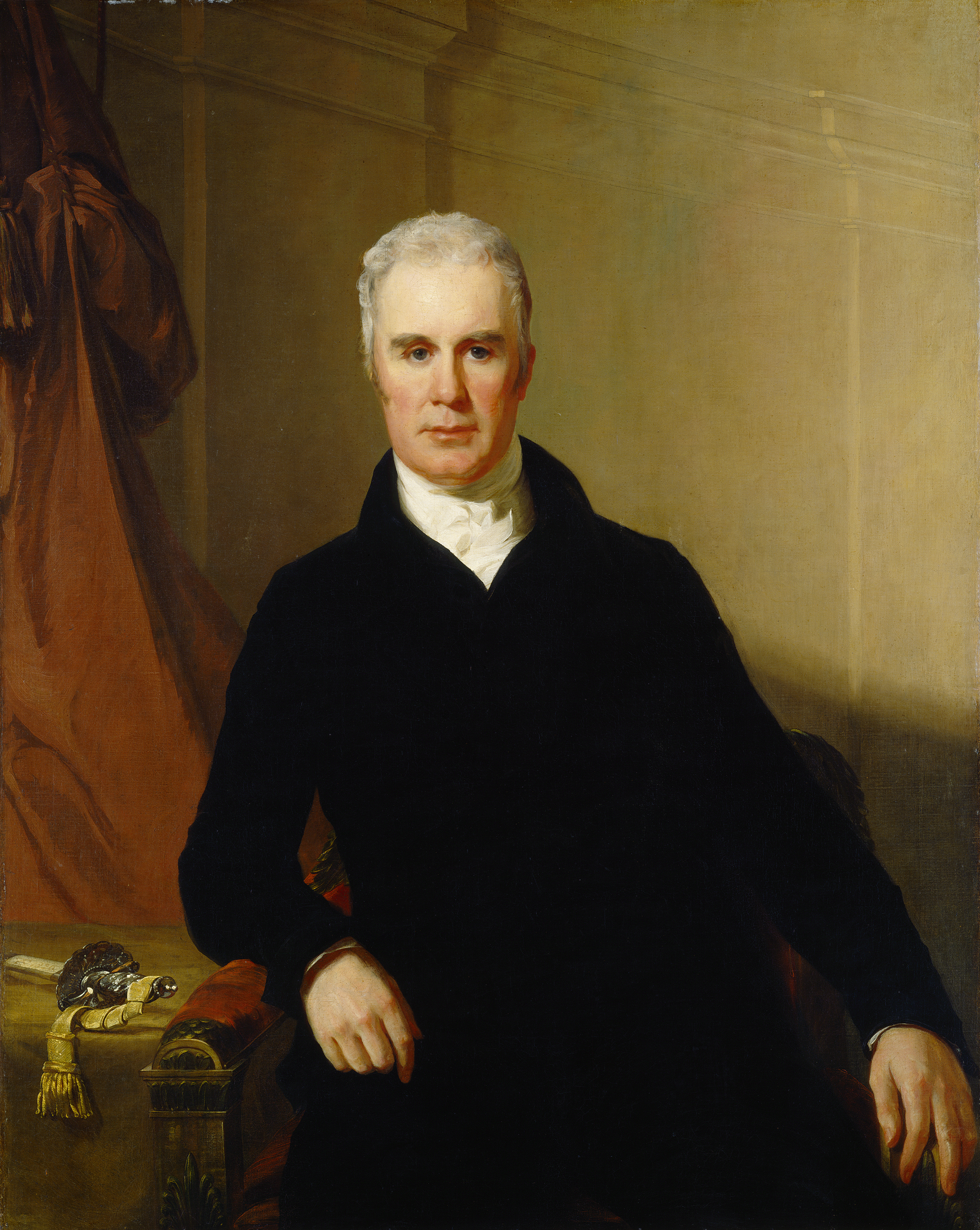

15th Governor of Maryland
- In office January 2, 1816 – January 8, 1819
- Preceded by: Levin Winder
- Succeeded by: Charles Goldsborough

Member of the Maryland Senate
- In office 1796–1800

Member of the Maryland House of Delegates
- In office 1790–1795
- Constituency: Baltimore County

Personal details
- Born: December 6, 1760 Baltimore, Province of Maryland, British America
- Died: July 17, 1829 (aged 68) Baltimore County, Maryland, U.S.
- Resting place: Family Vault, Hampton, Baltimore, Maryland
- Spouse: Priscilla Dorsey
- Children: 13
- Profession: Politician

Charles Carnan Ridgely (December 6, 1760 – July 17, 1829), born Charles Ridgely Carnan and also known as Charles Ridgely of Hampton, was an American politician and aristocrat who served as the 15th governor of Maryland from 1815 to 1818. He also served in the Maryland House of Delegates from 1790 to 1795, and in the Maryland State Senate from 1796 to 1800.

== Early life ==
Charles was born in Baltimore on December 6, 1760. He was the son of John Carnan and Achsah Ridgely, sister of Captain Charles Ridgely. The Maryland Gazette described him as an aristocrat.

== Political career ==
The Maryland Gazette stated that Ridgely "always avoided visionary schemes and dangerous experiments" when he served in the state legislature, "justly appreciating the merits and demerits of the human character". Ridgely devoted his tenure to internal improvements. He devoted his attention to the state during the unpopular war with Great Britain. It appropriated ground for the erection of a Battle Monument in Baltimore, aided education, and chartered manufacturing and insurance companies, so that 'during his administration, the State enjoyed its greatest period of prosperity.' Ridgely passed an act which provided education for the poor in five separate counties; which was seen as important to the early development of public education in Maryland. A second act created the Commissioners of the School Fund. The act appropriated a fund to establish free schools within the state of Maryland.

In 1792, Ridgely ran as an Anti-Federalist for Maryland's 5th congressional district, losing to Federalist Samuel Smith.

== Hampton ==
Coat of Arms of Charles Carnan Ridgley

Carnan's uncle, Captain Charles Ridgely, willed his estate, Hampton, to him on the condition that he assume the name Charles Ridgely; he did so legally in 1790. When Charles's uncle, Captain Ridgely, died in 1790, Ridgely became the second master of Hampton. The concept of Hampton was inspired by Castle Howard in North Yorkshire, England, owned by relatives of his grandmother. He had 10,590 feet (3,228 m) of irrigation pipes laid in 1799 from a nearby spring to provide water to the Mansion and the surrounding gardens, which he was extensively developing. Prominent artisans of the time were hired to design geometric formal gardens, which were planted on the Mansion's grounds between 1799 and 1801. An avid horseman, Charles Carnan also began raising Thoroughbred horses at Hampton, where he had a racetrack installed. A 1799 advertisement promoted the stud services of his racehorse, Grey Medley. Another of Ridgely's racehorses, Post Boy, won the Washington City Jockey Club cup.

Under Charles Carnan Ridgely, Hampton reached its peak of 25,000 acres (10,117 ha) in the 1820s. The mansion overlooked a grand estate of orchards, ironworks, coal mining, marble quarries, mills, and mercantile interests. The vast farm produced corn, beef cattle, dairy products, hogs, and horses. More than 300 slaves worked the fields and served the household, making Hampton one of Maryland's largest slaveholding estates. Six parterres were designed on three terraced levels facing the mansion, planted with roses, peonies, and seasonal flowers. In 1820, an orangery was built on the grounds.

Charles Carnan Ridgely frequently entertained prominent guests in the Mansion's Great Hall, such as Charles Carroll of Carrollton (1737-1832), who was the last surviving signer of the Declaration of Independence, and American Revolutionary War general and Frenchman, Marquis de Lafayette. Charles Carnan served as Governor of Maryland between 1816 and 1819. When Governor Ridgely died in 1829, he freed a portion of Hampton's slaves in his will.

His ancestral home, Hampton Mansion is now in the care of the National Park Service of the U.S. Department of the Interior as Hampton National Historic Site.

== Founding of the Washington Jockey Club ==
In 1798, Ridgely established the Washington Jockey Club, with a mile track that was laid out extending from the rear of what is now the site of Decatur House at H Street and Jackson Place, crossing Seventeenth Street and Pennsylvania Avenue to Twentieth Street. The inaugural match featured John Tayloe III's Lamplighter and Gen. Charles Carnan Ridgely's Cincinnatus, for 500 guineas, ran in 4-mile heats, and won by the former, a son of Imp English bred stallion Medley. The only initial building was a small elevated platform for the judges. The "carriage folk" took to the infield for views of the contests and the strandees crested the outside of the course. The site of today's Eisenhower Executive Office Building, this first course's history was short lived as it stood in the path of L'Enfant's city plan.

In 1802 the Club sought a new sight for the tract, as the current one that lay the rear of what is now the site of Decatur House at H Street and Jackson Place, crossing Seventeenth Street and Pennsylvania Avenue to Twentieth Street-today the Eisenhower Executive Office Building-was being overtaken be the growth of the Federal City. With the leadership of John Tayloe III and Charles Carnan Ridgely and support of Gen. John Peter Van Ness, Dr. William Thornton, G.W. P. Custis, John D. Threlkeld of Georgetown and George Calvert of Riversdale, Bladensburg, Maryland, the contests were moved to Meridian Hill, south of Columbia Road between Fourteenth and Sixteenth Streets, and were conducted at the Holmstead Farm's one mile oval track.

== Family ==
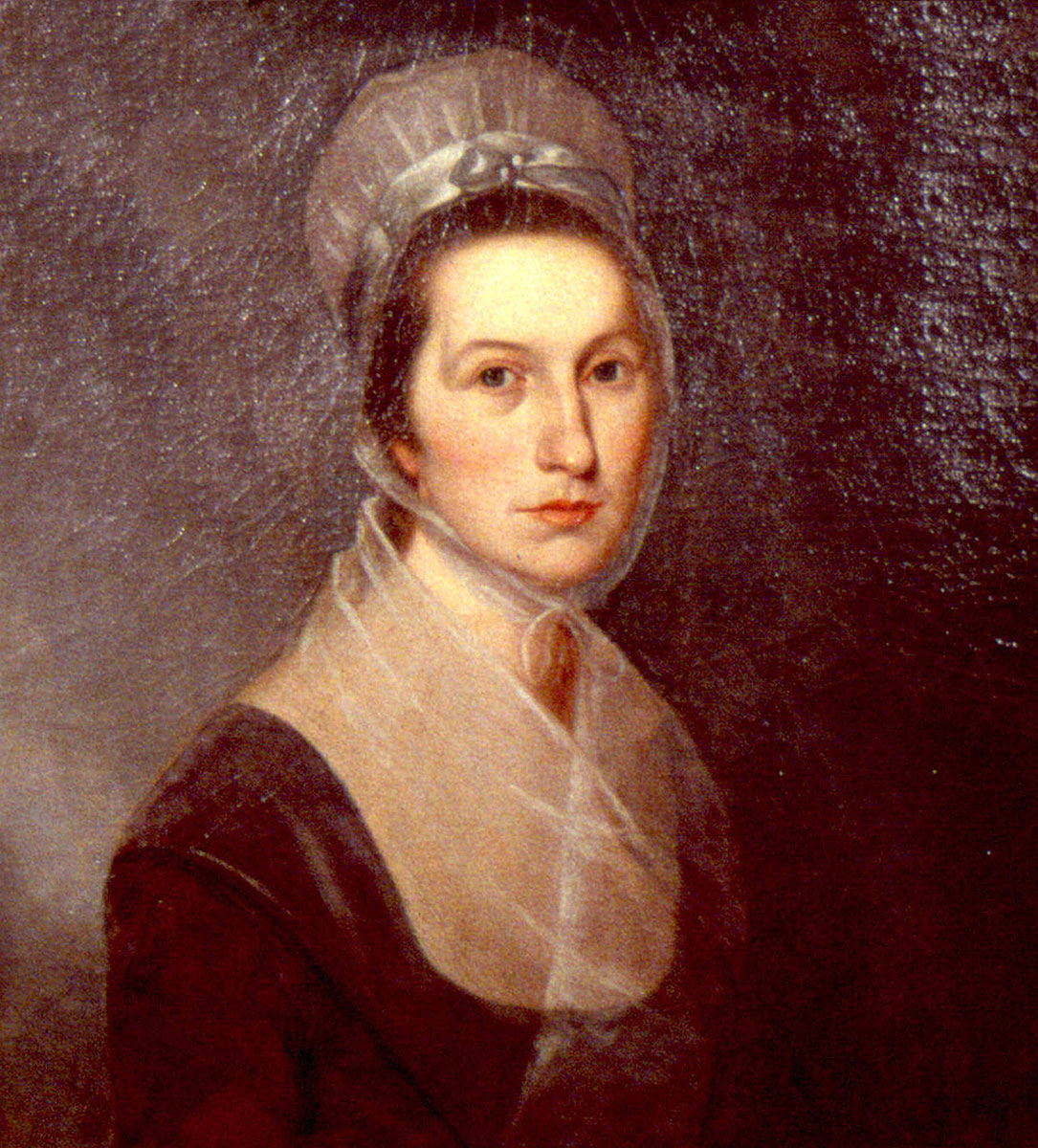
Priscilla Dorsey, copy of a portrait by Rembrandt Peale

Charles Ridgely Carnan married Priscilla Dorsey, daughter of Caleb Dorsey, Jr., of 'Belmont' and Priscilla Hill on October 17, 1782, at Old Saint Paul's Church (Episcopal/Anglican) in Baltimore, Maryland. Priscilla was the youngest sister of his uncle's wife, Rebecca Dorsey. The sisters were great-granddaughters of Hon. John Dorsey and his wife, Pleasance Ely. While her husband attended politics, Priscilla was the sole mistress of 'Hampton' and attended to their thirteen children.

Of the thirteen children, two are separately noticed. John Carnan Ridgely married Eliza Ridgely; he would inherit the mansion and 4,500 acres (18 km2).

Just as Ridgely was beginning his tenure as Governor of Maryland, Priscilla died on April 30, 1814. Her body was interred in the family vault at Hampton. Although she did not live to serve as First Lady of Maryland, her daughter, Prudence, would become First Lady to Governor George Howard of Maryland (1789–1846).

After his final term had ended on January 8, 1819, Ridgely retired to his estate at Hampton. There he devoted his attention to his farm and his iron works. In 1824, he suffered a paralytic attack from which he never fully recovered. Two later attacks caused his death on July 17, 1829. "At his death, his holdings amounted to about 10,000 acres of land in Baltimore County. He owned over three hundred slaves together with a library of about one hundred and seventy-five volumes, family silver valued at over $2,300, and a total estate of nearly $150,000." All slaves that had not reached the age of 45 were freed. It was also commented that 'from an early age, possessed of a princely estate, few individuals, perhaps ever more enjoyed what are called the good things of this life and abused them so little."

He was buried with his wife, Priscilla, in the Ridgely family vault at Hampton.

Political offices
Preceded by Levin Winder	Governor of Maryland; 1815–1818	Succeeded by Charles Goldsborough
