= Hampton National Historic Site =

Preserved slave estate in Baltimore County, Maryland

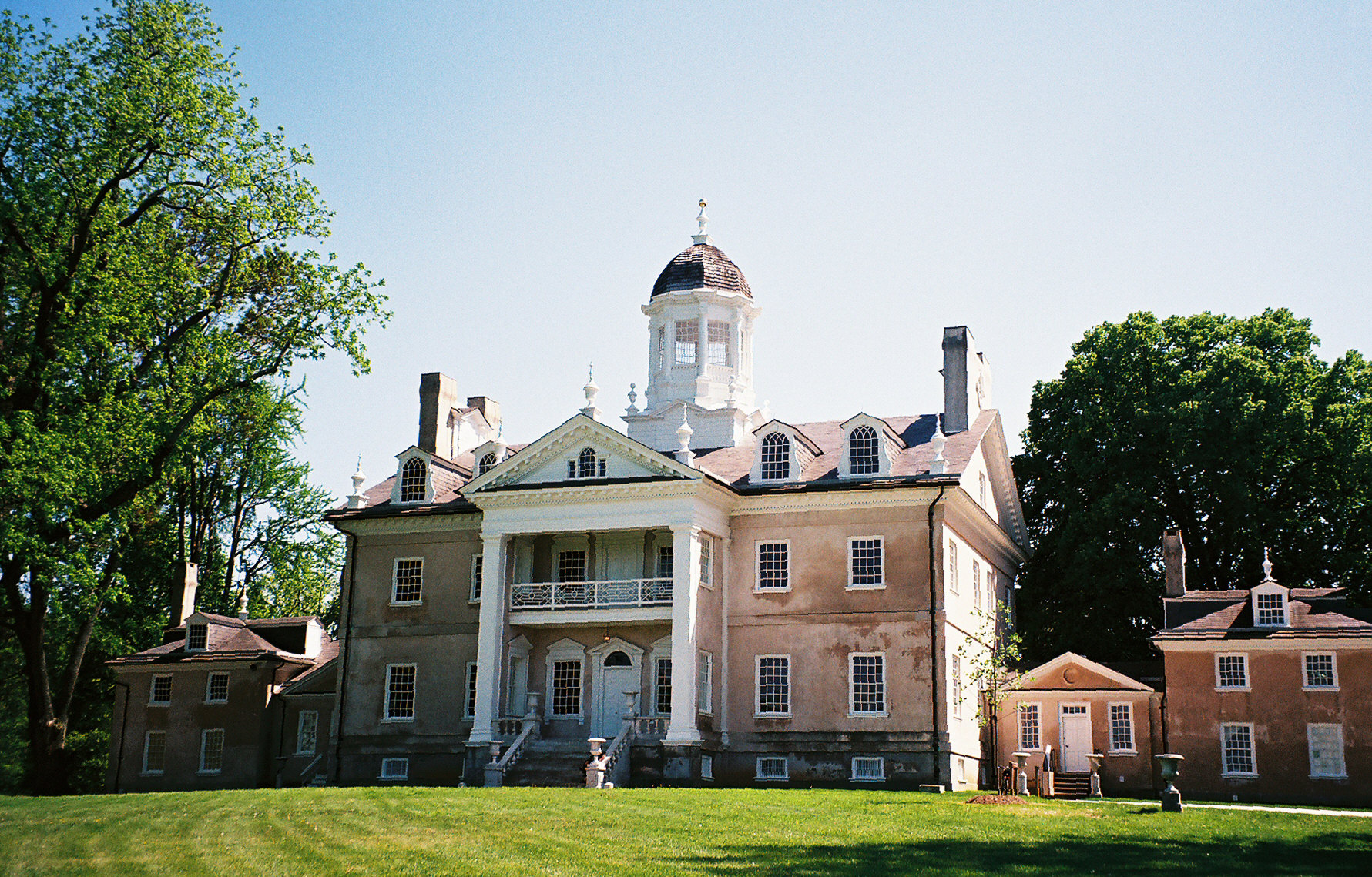

- Location within Maryland Location within the United States
- Location: Baltimore County, Maryland, USA
- Nearest city: Baltimore, Maryland
- Coordinates: 39°24′58″N 76°35′15″W
- Area: 62.04 acres (25.11 ha)
- Established: June 22, 1948
- Visitors: 14,612 (in 2023)
- Governing body: National Park Service
- Website: Hampton National Historic Site

Hampton National Historic Site, in the Hampton area north of Towson, Baltimore County, Maryland, preserves a remnant of a vast 18th-century estate, including a Georgian manor house, gardens, grounds, and the original stone slave quarters. The estate was owned by the Ridgely family for seven generations, from 1745 to 1948. The Hampton Mansion was the largest private home in America when it was completed in 1790 and today is considered to be one of the finest examples of Georgian architecture in the United States. Its furnishings, together with the estate's slave quarters and other preserved structures, provide insight into the life of late 18th-century and early 19th-century landowning aristocracy. In 1948, Hampton was the first site selected as a National Historical Site for its architectural significance by the U.S. National Park Service. The grounds were widely admired in the 19th century for their elaborate parterres or formal gardens, which have been restored to resemble their appearance during the 1820s. Several trees are more than 200 years old.

The mansion and grounds are open to visitors, as are the overseer's house and slave quarters. Unlike most plantations, Hampton retains its original slave quarters.

== History ==
=== 18th century ===
The property was originally part of the Northampton land grant given to Col. Henry Darnall (c. 1645–1711), a relative of Lord Baltimore, in 1695. His heirs sold the land on April 2, 1745, to Col. Charles Ridgely (1702–72), a tobacco farmer and trader. The bill of sale records that the property included "... houses, tobacco houses (tobacco barns), stables, gardens, and orchards."

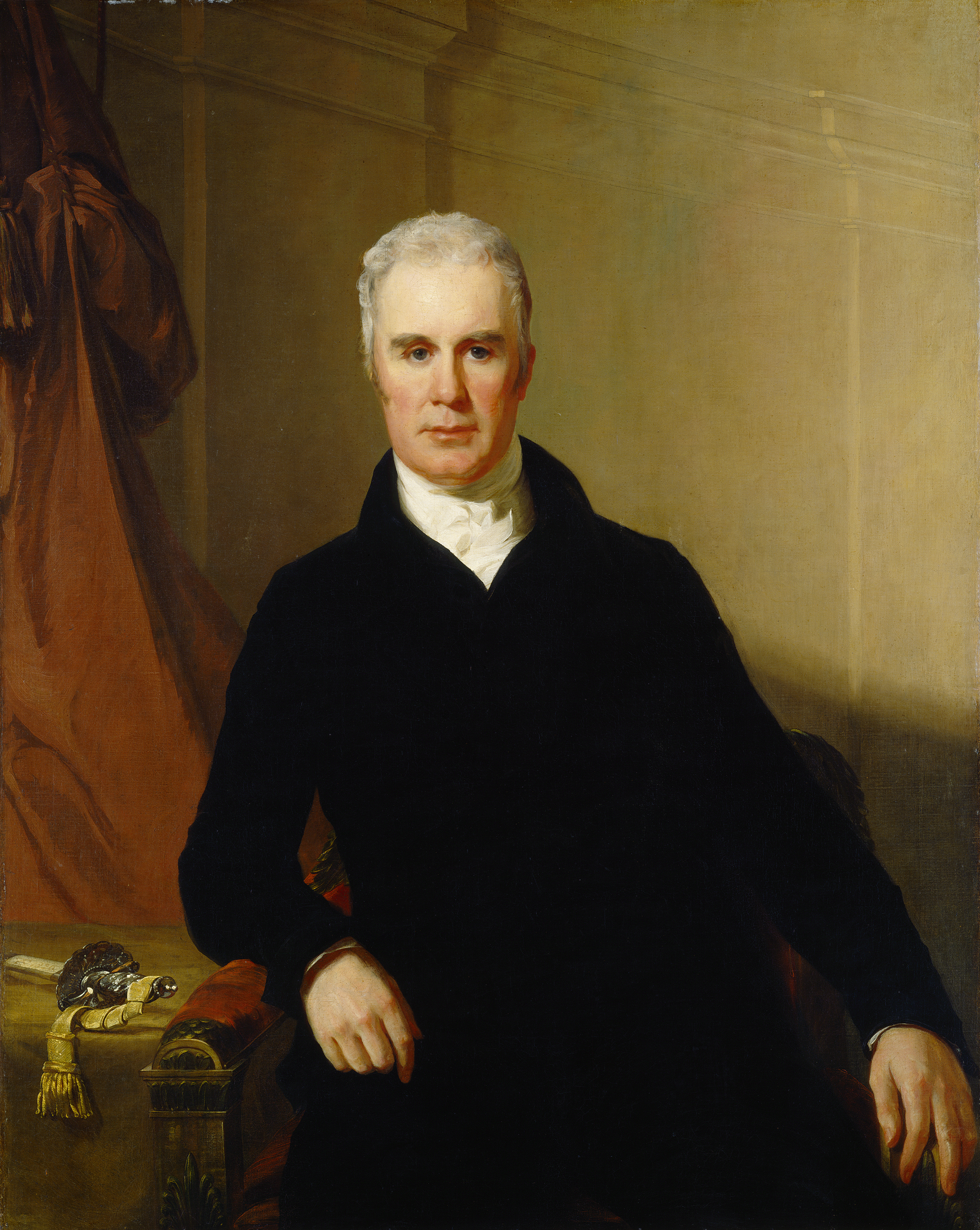
Charles Carnan Ridgely, Hampton's second master

By the late 1750s, Hampton extended to more than 10,000 acres (4,000 ha) and included an ironworks. His son, Capt. Charles Ridgely (1733–90), expanded the family business considerably to include gristmills, apple orchards, and stone quarries. During the American Revolutionary War, the ironworks was a significant source of income for the Ridgelys, producing cannons and ammunition for the Continental Army. In 1783, Capt. Ridgely began construction of the main house, Hampton Mansion. He said its concept was inspired by Castle Howard in England, owned by relatives of his mother. When it was completed in 1790, the Hampton Mansion was the largest private home in the United States.

When Capt. Ridgely died that same year, his nephew, Charles Carnan Ridgely (1760–1829), became the second master of Hampton. He had 10,590 feet (3,228 m) of irrigation pipes laid in 1799 from a nearby spring to provide water to the Mansion and the surrounding gardens, which he was extensively developing. Prominent artisans were hired to design geometric formal gardens, which were planted on the Mansion's grounds between 1799 and 1801. An avid horseman, Charles Carnan began raising thoroughbred horses and installed a racetrack. A 1799 advertisement promoted the stud services of his racehorse, Grey Medley. Another of Ridgely's racehorses, Post Boy, won the Washington City Jockey Club cup.

=== 19th century ===
Under Charles Carnan Ridgely, Hampton reached its peak of 25,000 acres (10,117 ha) in the 1820s. The mansion overlooked a grand estate of orchards, ironworks, coal mining, marble quarries, mills, and mercantile interests. The vast farm produced corn, beef cattle, dairy products, hogs, and horses. More than 300 enslaved people worked the fields and served the household, making Hampton one of Maryland's largest slaveholding estates. Six parterres were designed on three terraced levels facing the mansion, planted with roses, peonies, and seasonal flowers. In 1820, an orangery was built on the grounds.

Thomas Sully. Lady with a Harp: Eliza Ridgely. 1818. National Gallery of Art, Washington, D.C.

Charles Carnan Ridgely frequently entertained prominent guests in the Mansion's 51 ft. x 21 ft. (16 m by 6.4 m) Great Hall, such as Charles Carroll of Carrollton, who was a signer of the Declaration of Independence, and Revolutionary War general, the Marquis de Lafayette. Charles Carnan served as governor of Maryland between 1816–19. When Governor Ridgely died in 1829, he freed Hampton's enslaved people in his will.

The Hampton estate was split among various heirs, with his son, John Carnan Ridgely (1790–1867), inheriting the mansion and 4,500 acres (18 km^{2}). The ironworks closed and thereafter the Ridgelys' income was primarily derived from farming, investments, and their stone quarries. John Carnan added plumbing, heating, and gas lighting to the mansion.

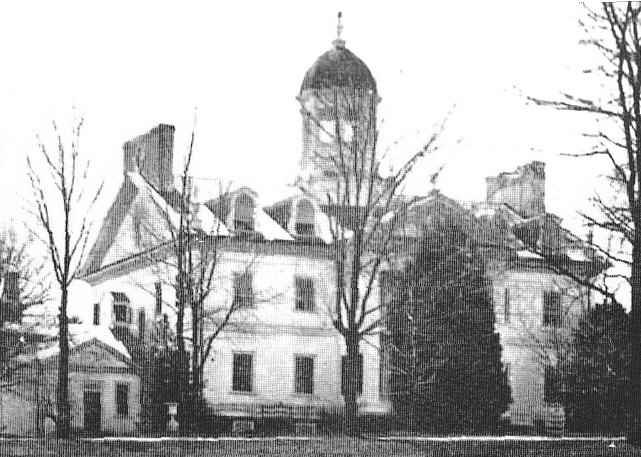
Hampton Mansion in 1861

Eliza Ridgely (1803–67), John's wife and the subject of Thomas Sully's famous portrait, Lady with a Harp, purchased many artworks and furnishings for the mansion. She was a noted horticulturist and had successively larger and more elaborate gardens cultivated on the grounds, with a large variety of flowers and shrubs grown in the estate's greenhouses and tended by some of the 60 enslaved people purchased by John Carnan Ridgely. By the mid-19th century, the Hampton estate had one of the most extensive collections of citrus trees in the U.S., along with various exotic trees and plants gathered by Eliza Ridgely during her frequent travels to Europe and the Orient. In the warm months, the potted citrus plants were brought outside and arranged around the terraced gardens, then taken into the heated orangery during the winter. She had one section of the garden planted with colorful red, yellow, pink, and maroon coleus from Asia. In 1859, Hampton's fame for lavish style was such that the author of a book on landscaping wrote, "It has been truly said of Hampton that it expresses more grandeur than any other place in America".

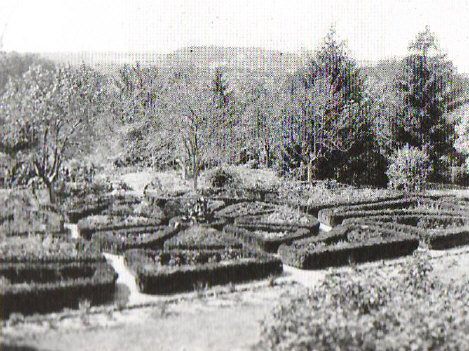
Terraced gardens in 1872

In January 1861, shortly after the election of Abraham Lincoln as President of the United States, Charles Ridgely (the son of John Carnan and Eliza Ridgely) formed the pro-Confederate Baltimore County Horse Guards at Hampton with himself as captain of the militia unit that he described as "states' rights gentlemen." One of his militia's cavalry men, Lieut. John Merryman, was subsequently arrested by the Union Army and imprisoned in May 1861 on a charge of treason, sparking the landmark U.S. Supreme Court case, Ex parte Merryman. As the Civil War raged across the farmlands of Maryland and Pennsylvania at the Battle of Antietam (1862) and the Battle of Gettysburg (1863), the Ridgelys' Hampton estate remained untouched.

Although Maryland, as a border state, was exempted from Lincoln's Emancipation Proclamation, the Maryland General Assembly eliminated slavery in 1864. With the end of slavery, Hampton began to decline. A number of the former enslaved people continued to work at Hampton as paid household servants but the Ridgelys had to hire other hands to work the farm. With the deaths of John and Eliza in 1867, their son Charles became the next master of Hampton. The mansion and the remaining 1,000 acres (4.0 km^{2}) were subsequently inherited upon Charles' death in 1872 by Captain John Ridgely (1851–1938). Prominent guests, including Theodore Roosevelt, continued to visit Hampton and enjoy its grounds.

=== 20th century ===
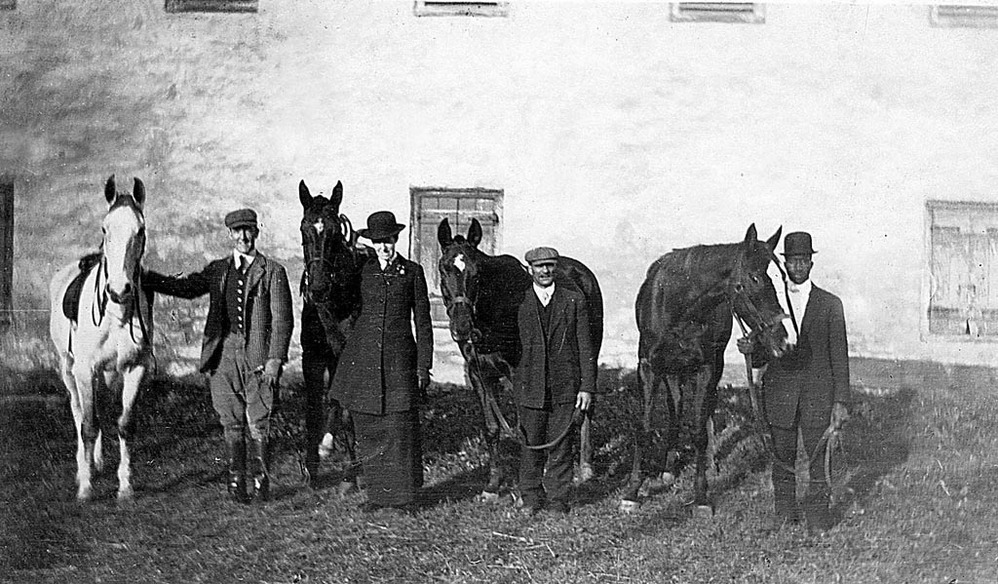
This image taken in front of one of the stables buildings in the Autumn of 1912 shows John Ridgely Jr. (left), Louise Hurmrichouse (second from left), Louis Davis (second from right) and an African American groomer or trainer listed only as "Bryan" (right).

As nearby Baltimore grew and local agriculture declined, the Ridgelys found it increasingly difficult to maintain the property. Five of the six parterres were removed and replanted as a grass lawn. Some income was generated by producing cider from the estate's apple orchards and operating a dairy. In 1929, Capt. John Ridgely and his son, John Ridgely Jr., formed the Hampton Development Corporation and sold some of the remaining 1,000 acres (405 ha) of land. In 1938, John Ridgely, Jr. (1882–1959) became the sixth generation of the family to become master of Hampton. His company sold off large portions of the estate to a suburban housing development in the 1930s and 1940s, now known as the fashionable Hampton residential community.

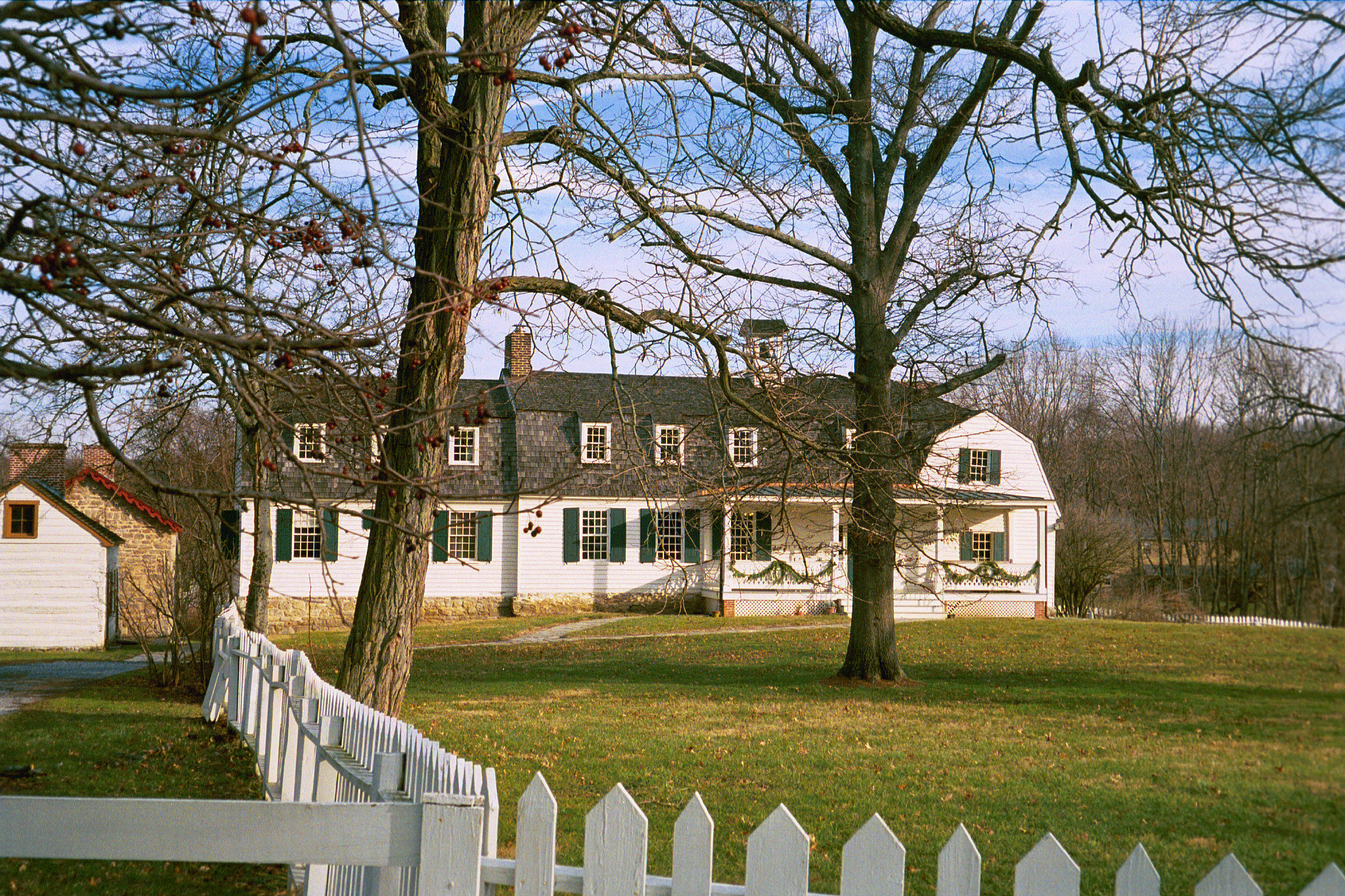
The Farm House, where John Ridgely Jr. moved in 1948

The Hampton Mansion remained in the Ridgely family until 1948, when John Ridgely Jr. moved to the smaller Farm House on the property and the Mansion was acquired by the Avalon Foundation (now part of the Andrew W. Mellon Foundation). The seventh and last generation of Ridgelys to live at the mansion was his son, John Ridgely III (1911–90), who, after marrying Lillian Ketchum (1908–96) in the mid-1930s, continued to reside at the mansion with his wife until they both entered Army service during World War II.

The Hampton Mansion and remaining 43 acres (17 ha) of the Ridgely estate were designated a National Historic Site by the Secretary of the Interior on June 22, 1948—the first site to be so selected on the basis of its historical significance and "outstanding merit as an architectural monument". Hampton Mansion was opened to the public in May 1949 under the care of Preservation Maryland for the next thirty years (1949–79). Work also began in 1949 to restore four of the site's six 19th-century parterres. On October 15, 1966, Hampton was listed on the National Register of Historic Places. In October 1979, it was acquired by the National Park Service (NPS), which has operated and managed the estate since. The NPS subsequently acquired additional acreage containing original Ridgely structures, bringing the park to its present 62.04 acres (25.11 ha) size. In 1998, the NPS stated its purpose for the historic site:

... to preserve unimpaired the cultural resources of this rare, commercial, industrial, and agricultural estate in the historic Chesapeake region. National events and social change are revealed in the site's resources and the inter-relationships of the family and workers who lived and labored on the estate as it took shape and changed in the 18th and 19th centuries.

=== 21st century ===
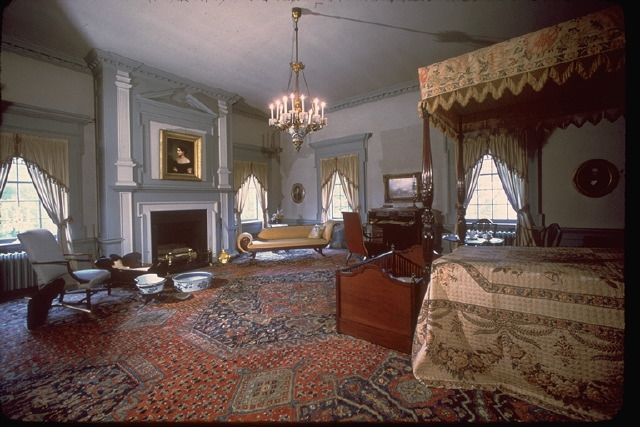
Mansion bedroom with original furnishings

As part of the General Management Plan adopted by the NPS in 1998 for the estate's long-term planning and operation, the NPS began studying the mansion's security, safety, electrical systems, and environmental issues in 2000. Critical needs were identified, such as the lack of a fire suppression system and climate control. Conservators of the property's furnishings and paintings said that the need to stabilize temperature and humidity levels inside the mansion was "urgent due to unacceptable environmental stress". The NPS finalized plans in 2004, including an environmental impact assessment, for installation of a modern HVAC system and a concealed fire sprinkler system to protect the historic mansion and its irreplaceable contents from loss by fire.

Starting in January 2005, the mansion closed for almost three years as it underwent the major restoration project. As part of the 2005–07 renovations, the drawing room and two bedchambers were completely refurbished. The drawing room's furnishings were extensively researched to reflect accurately the Mansion in the 1830–60 period. The ornate cupola atop the mansion was restored, including the spherical ornament above the cupola, which was refinished in gold leaf. The Hampton Mansion re-opened to the public on November 30, 2007.

The Park Service's chief ranger for the Hampton National Historic Site said afterwards of the $3 million in renovations, "I don't think the mansion has ever looked better". "Preservation Maryland", a statewide preservation advocacy organization, conferred its Stewardship Award in 2007 on the Hampton National Historic Site for refurnishing the mansion's rooms with historical accuracy while unobtrusively installing the fire suppression and climate control systems.

After an order by President Donald Trump to eliminate diversity, equity and inclusion efforts led National Park Service officials to scrub many mentions of the accomplishments of LGBT+ people, women and people of color from its webpages, historians worried the same fate would befall Hampton National Historic Site's website and undo years of efforts to document the lives of the enslaved people who lived there and the role the Ridgely family played in segregation. As of 12 November 2025, visitors can still read ″Stories of the Enslaved″ and ″Free Black Laborers″ on the park′s website.

== National Park Service management ==
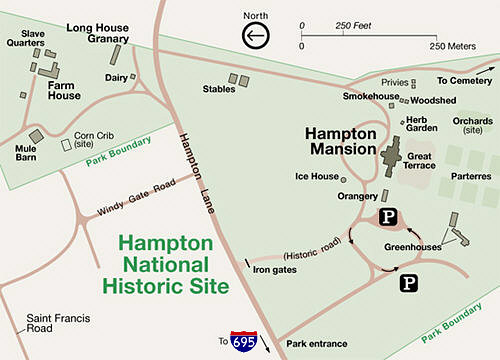
A map of Hampton

The remaining 62.04-acre (25.11 ha) estate, straddling Hampton Lane, is now managed by the National Park Service and open to the public, with ample free parking, a gift shop, and wheelchair accessibility at the mansion. Visitors are provided a guided tour of the mansion, where the original furnishings owned by the Ridgelys may be seen, along with the family's collection of oil paintings, silverware, and ceramics comprising some 7,000 objects. In addition to the mansion itself, visitors may view nine surviving original structures on the grounds built during the 18th to mid-19th century period:

- Farm House – located 1,900 feet (580 m) north of the mansion and next to the slave quarters, a portion is believed to predate the Ridgelys' purchase of the property in 1745. The Ridgely family lived here while the mansion was being constructed in the 1780s. Thereafter, it was the residence of the farm manager or overseer. After John Ridgely Jr. and his wife Jane vacated the mansion in 1948, they lived here until their deaths.
- Slave quarters – two preserved stone buildings adjacent to the Farm House, now provided with interpretive exhibits on enslaved life at Hampton. The stone came from the Ridgelys' own stone quarry. As the Associated Press reported in 2007: "The contrast between the bleak slave quarters ... and the mansion's beautifully appointed interior could not be more stark". Displayed is a newspaper advertisement by Charles Carnan Ridgely offering a reward for the return of a runaway slave, as well as a Christmas gift list kept from 1841 to 1854 by the daughter of John Carnan and Eliza for the slaves' children.
- Dairy – built of stone before 1800
- Mule barn – built of stone c. 1845
- Long house/granary
- Ash house, wooden log building, and dovecote

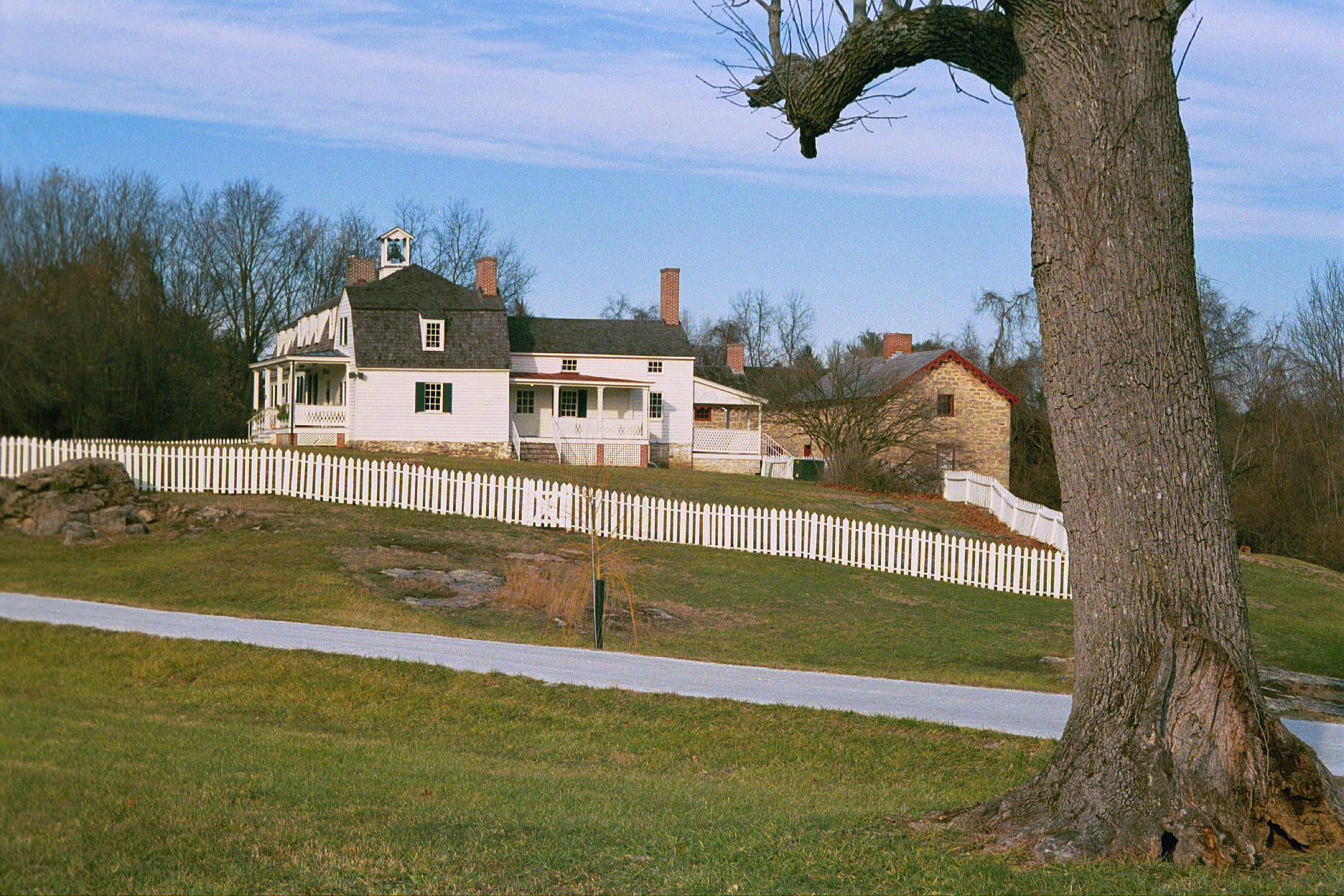
The Farm House (left) and slave quarters (right) in 2007

Self-guided tours may be made of the grounds during hours when the park is open to the public, including the farm, formal garden, family cemetery, and two stables built of stone for the Ridgely family's thoroughbred horses. A replica of the original orangery (built in 1824) may also be viewed (the original wooden orangery, which burned down in 1926, was reconstructed on the original foundations in 1976). One surviving 34-foot (10.4 m) deep underground icehouse is visible near the mansion and is open to visitors. Among the surviving trees planted by the Ridgelys in the 1820s are a large tulip tree, a European beech, and Catalpas. A prize Cedar of Lebanon, brought back from the Middle East as a seedling by Eliza Ridgely, is one of the largest in the U.S.

Numerous special events are scheduled throughout the year, such as chamber music concerts and harpsichord performances presented in the mansion's ornate Great Hall, milking demonstrations at the dairy by costumed milkmaids, carriage rides, hay harvesting by scythe, corn harvesting, blacksmithing demonstrations, and jousting reenactments. The Baltimore Sun reported that Hampton had 35,000 visitors in 2008.

The local community actively supports the site's preservation through a non-profit friends' group, "Historic Hampton," which has assisted the National Park Service in achieving historical accuracy and interpretive potential of the interiors, along with presentation of various activities. In May 2008, a $195,000 (~$285,873 in 2025) challenge grant was announced by the National Park Service, matched by an equal amount to be raised by Historic Hampton, for further restoration of the mansion's interiors. The National Park Service also maintains an on-site archive of Ridgely family papers from 1750–1990 for researchers.

== Closure of the Tea Room ==
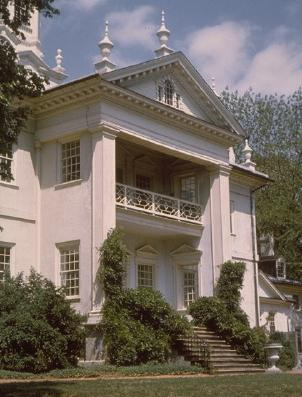
Mansion front facade detail

When the Hampton estate first opened to the public in 1949, the mansion's kitchen was converted into a small restaurant. Known as the Tea Room, it was operated by a concessionaire for the next 50 years, serving lunches featuring Hampton Imperial Crab (backfin lump meat from the blue crab, baked and seasoned with spices) and other Chesapeake Bay seafood delicacies, served with a glass of sherry. A local newspaper columnist described the Tea Room as "offering gentility ... a fireplace nearly as big as a wall and mullioned windows with sills that are nearly 2 feet (0.61 m) thick. The view is rolling lawns ..."

When the Tea Room was closed by the National Park Service on January 1, 1999, officials said they did so because of the potential fire hazard posed by operating a kitchen in the main park building and the possibility of insect or rodent damage to historic items in the mansion, as stated in the General Management Plan adopted by the NPS the previous year. While it "may be a pleasant place to enjoy a meal ... that is clearly less important than the need to preserve Hampton's buildings, objects and landscapes for future generations," the Park Service stated. Officials of Preservation Maryland said they were "disappointed" by the restaurant's closure, saying it helped attract visitors to the historic site. The former chairwoman of the Hampton women's committee—which raises money for various projects at Hampton—also criticized the decision. Since 2006, the women's group has renewed efforts to have the Tea Room reopened, saying it would draw more visitors and repeat business from locals to the park. A Park Service spokesman was quoted as saying in October, 2006, that "The mansion is not going to be the site of any food operation," but has made no further comment since then.
