= Charles Ridgely III =

American ironmonger and planter (1733–1790)

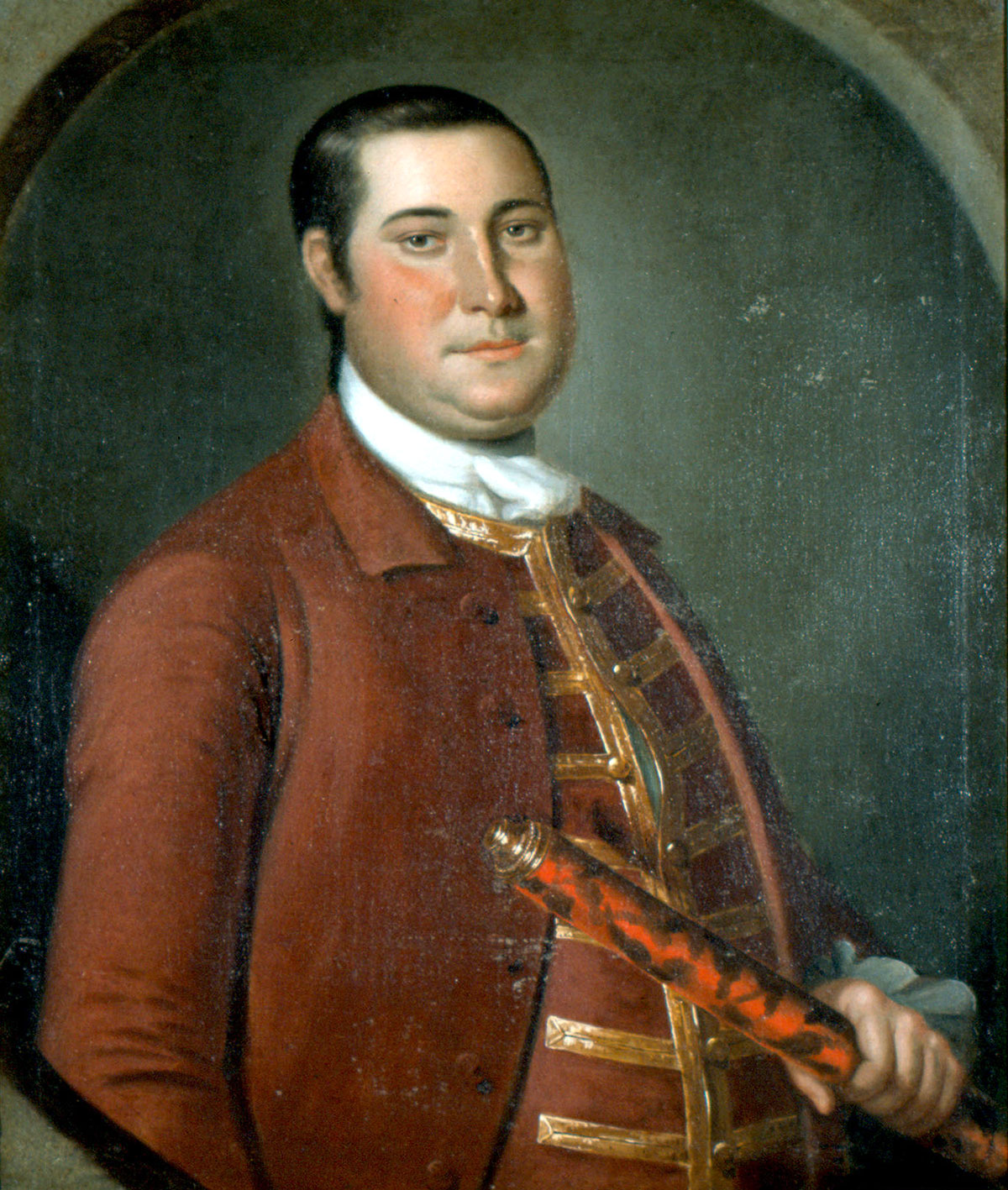
- portrait by John Hesselius
- Born: September 17, 1733
- Died: June 28, 1790
- Occupations: Plantation owner, sea captain

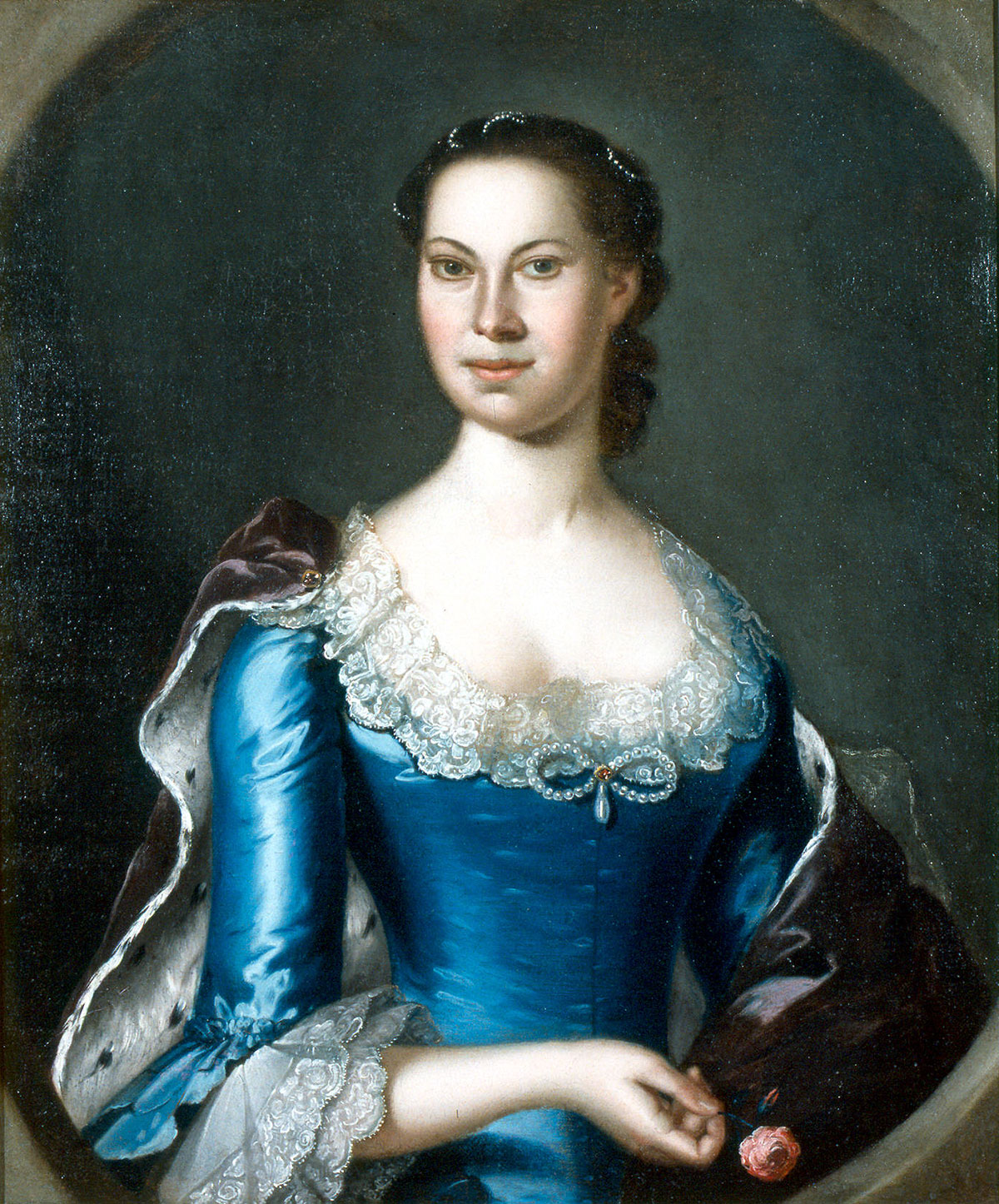
Rebecca Dorsey Ridgely, great-granddaughter of Hon. John Dorsey.

Captain Charles Ridgely III (1733–1790) was a colonial Maryland planter and ironmonger.

== Biography ==
Ridgely was born in Maryland Province in 1733 to Colonel Charles Ridgely II ("Charles the Merchant") and Rachel Howard. With his father and brother, he established the Northampton Iron Works just north of future Towsontown /Towson, under what is now Loch Raven Reservoir. He married Rebecca Dorsey, the daughter of Caleb Dorsey, an ironmonger in Anne Arundel County. Caleb was a grandson of Hon. John Dorsey.

Ridgely built the massive Hampton Mansion (now a National Historic Site), after the American Revolutionary War, between 1783 and 1790. By the time it was completed, the Georgian-style structure was the largest private home in the country. The Mansion is now preserved as the Hampton National Historic Site and cared for / operated by the National Park Service of the U.S. Department of the Interior.

Capt. Ridgely died in 1790, and left the inheritance to his nephew Charles Carnan if he would assume the family name and carry on the Ridgely title. So Charles Carnan Ridgely, became the second master of the Hampton estate and eventually Governor of Maryland.
