= Darby Lux I =

American lawyer

Capt. Darby Lux I (1695–1750) was a mariner, merchant, and Justice of Baltimore County, Maryland. The son of an English clergyman, was born in Kenton Parish, Devonshire, England, on June 15, 1695. He was christened on June 30, 1696, in Kenton. Darby immigrated in the early 1720s and settled in Anne Arundel County. He was a mariner by occupation from 1720 to 1742.

== Marriage ==
Lux married Ann Saunders (1700–1785) on May 16, 1722. Ann was born May 16, 1700, and died October 30, 1784. Ann was the daughter of Robert Saunders (d. 1755) and Rebeckath Groom (d. 1752).

== Career ==
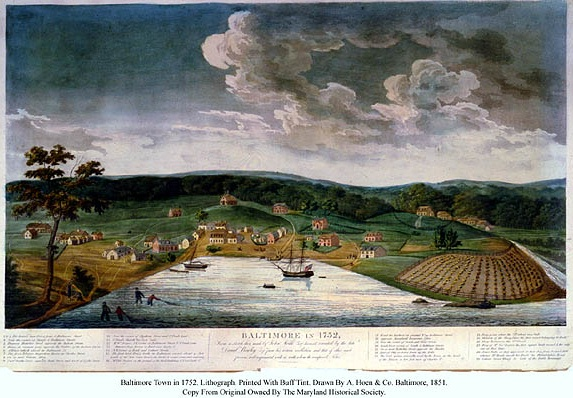
Baltimore in 1752. Engraved in 1851 by William Strickland, from contemporary sketch by John Moale (1731–1798)

Lux became a member of the South River Club and was termed a gentleman by 1743.

After the Transportation Act 1717, Lux became involved in penal transportation. He commanded several ships contracted by Jonathan Forward to transport convicted felons (women, men, and children) from London to Maryland, where they were sold as convict bond servants for 7 or 14 years of labor. These ships included: Gilbert, 1721 & 1722; Jonathan, 1723; Patapsco Merchant, 1729, 1730, 1731, 1732, 1733, 1734, & 1735; and Genoa, 1738. (An earlier voyage of the ship Genoa, 1736, was captained by Lux's brother Capt. Francis Lux.) Typical of Lux's convict transport voyages was the "Patapsco Merchant", which arrived in Baltimore, Maryland, in May, 1730, with 106 prisoners from the Newgate Prison, London, Middlesex Co., England. Of the estimated 50,000 convicts transported to the British colonies, Lux carried at least 1,000 from London to Maryland on eleven voyages within seventeen years.

Lux carried return cargos of tobacco on board his ships bound for Great Britain and on general consignment to Jonathan Forward, merchant of London.

Retiring from the sea, Lux moved to Baltimore Town in 1743 and became a prominent merchant. Lux acted as legal representative in Maryland for mariners and for London merchants, including Jonathan Forward and James Forward of London.

As a merchant, Lux imported goods from England and the Caribbean (and exported Maryland products) from his wharf on Light Street in Baltimore Town. Light Street was named in his honor (Lux is Latin for light). After his death, his son Capt. William Lux, Sr. took over and expanded his father's business by acquiring a rope walk.

Lux owned the ship "Baltimore Town", the first Baltimore owned ship to sail from that port. In 1733, he sailed to London aboard the sloop "Baltimore Town", which carried twenty guns and a crew of forty. His house, located at 43-44 Light Street, and his ship are shown in the contemporary sketch "Baltimore In 1752", painted by Lt. Col. John Moale, Jr., Esq. (1731–1798), in 1752, and engraved in 1817 by William Strickland.

Lux was a vestryman of St. Paul's Parish and was a Commissioner of Baltimore town from 1744 to 1747, and again in 1750. He was also a Justice in Baltimore County, Maryland, and at the same time served as a delegate of the Lower House of the General Assembly from 1749 to 1750.

== Death ==
Capt. Lux died October 14, 1750, of pleurisy, in his 53rd year, having served as a Magistrate and Representative of Baltimore County. At this time, Darby had accumulated 1,252 acres (5 km^{2}) of land in Baltimore, Frederick, and Dorchester counties, plus 2 lots in Baltimore Town (#43 & #44). Included in this were: 10 acres (40,000 m^{2}) of "Mactington"; 450 acres (1.8 km^{2}) of "Derbyshire"; 100 acres (0.40 km^{2}) of "Groome’s Chance"; and "Lux’s Conveniency". His estate was valued at 555.9.1 pounds sterling, 3,489.16.0 pounds current money, and 1,683 pounds of tobacco, including 4 servants, 11 slaves, "sundry European goods", books, the sloop "Baltimore Town", the schooner "Polly", and a vessel under construction. Lux's will specified equal distribution of his slaves, with one exception: no slave was to be given to his daughter Elizabeth Lux Bowley, or to her son Daniel Bowley II (1745–1807), because she had already received a wedding gift of one enslaved woman and one enslaved boy.

== Children ==
1. Mary Lux (ca. 1723).

2. Elizabeth Lux (1725–1793), who married Capt. Daniel Bowley (1715–1745).

3. Sarah Lux (ca. 1727 – ca. 1734), who died young.

4. William Lux, Esq. (1730–1778), who married Agnes Walker (1731–1785), daughter of George Walker and Mary Price.

5. Ann Lux (1736), who married Nicholas Ruxton Gay (died 1770), a surveyor of Baltimore, Maryland.

6. Lt. Col. Darby Lux II (1737–1795), who married Rachel Ridgely (1734–1813), daughter of Col. Charles Ridgely II, "Charles The Merchant" (1702–1772) of "Ridgely’s Whim", and his first wife, Rachel Howard (ca. 1696–1750).

7. Sarah Jane Lux (1738–1817) married Capt. Alexander Stewart in 1757. Capt. Stewart died in 1769.

8. Robert Lux (ca. 1739–1796).

9. Rebecca Lux (d. ca. 1780), who married Col. Daniel Hughes (died 1818).

10. Frances Lux (1747–1793), who married William Russell.

11. Jane Lux, no further information.

12. William (d. 1772), executor of Lux's will & received Frederick Co. land bequest

== Ancestry ==
Capt. Darby Lux I, was the son of William Lux II, Vicar (ca. 1657–1714) and his wife Elizabeth. At the age of 18, William matriculated at Balliol College, Oxford, England. He received his B.A. in 1678 and his M.A. in 1682. William served as Vicar of Kenton, Devonshire, England.

William II was the son of William Lux I and his wife Wilmot (d. 1703). William resided at his estate "Ippleden", located in Devonshire, England. The Lux coat of arms included three mullets with a beast rampant in the base.
