= Charles Ridgely II =

American politician (1702–1772)

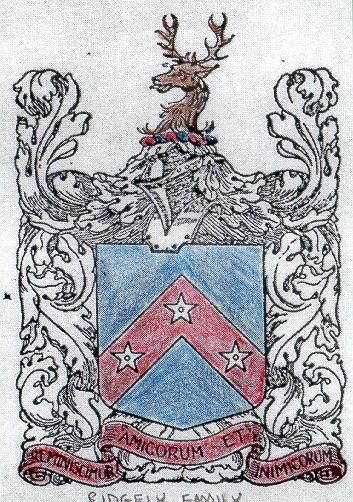
Ridgely Coat of Arms

Colonel Charles Ridgely II (1702 – 1772) was an American justice, planter, merchant, ironmaster, and member of the General Assembly of Maryland's lower chamber, House of Delegates and one of Baltimore County's commissioners. Charles II was the son of Charles Ridgely I, (known as "Charles the Planter"), (c. 1670 – 1705), and Deborah Dorsey (c. 1685 – 1752), daughter of Hon. John Dorsey.

Ridgely was born in Prince George's County, in the Calvert / Lord Baltimore's proprietary colony of the Province of Maryland, and still a minor at the death of his father in 1705. He inherited the estates "White Wine" and "Claret" from his grandfather Hon. John Dorsey, Capt. (c. 1645 – 1715), although he never lived at either. At the time they totaled 1,400 acres (5.7 km^{2}) between them, and Ridgely later resurveyed them into 2,145 acres (8.68 km^{2}) by adding some surplus land.

== First marriage ==
Ridgely married Rachel Howard (c. 1696 – 1750) of "Hampton", in about 1722. Rachel was born in about 1696 in Baltimore County, Maryland, and died in 1750. Rachel was the daughter of Captain John Howard Jr. (c. 1667 – 1704) and his first wife Mary Warfield (c. 1670 – 1699).

== Political career ==
Ridgely became a justice of the peace in Baltimore County in 1741, a position he held until 1753, and became a Justice of the Quorum in 1750. In addition he served as a justice of the Especial Court of Oyer, Terminer, and Gaol Delivery in 1748 and 1750. Ridgely served in the Maryland House of Delegates, the lower chamber of the General Assembly of Maryland for Baltimore County from 1751 to 1754, and at the same time as a Baltimore county commissioner. Ridgely was commissioned a major in 1751, and became a colonel in the Maryland Provincial Militia by 1757. He was also a vestryman and churchwarden of Old St. Paul's Parish (Anglican / Church of England) in downtown Baltimore.

== Land holdings ==
Upon his marriage to Rachel, he acquired the estate known as "Howard's Timber Neck" from his father-in-law, just southwest of Baltimore Town, which had been established in 1729, and laid out the following year. In 1732, this land was combined with another property known as "Brotherly Love", resurveyed and renamed "Ridgely's Delight". In 1735, Ridgely began leasing parcels of land in "Ridgely's Delight", now a southwestern Baltimore city neighborhood, just outside the downtown area and adjacent to the sports stadiums complex of Camden Yards, of 1992–1998, built on top of the former railyards of the Baltimore and Ohio Railroad and its historic Camden Street Station and former headquarters, built 1857–1865. The later historic district and rowhouse tight neighborhood which remains today and is still known as "Ridgely's Delight", and is situated on what was first a Susquehannock Indian path leading south from the Susquehanna River valley further north, and in the Federal period of the late 18th century, a main East Coast post road /highway from Philadelphia southwest through Baltimore and on to Georgetown, Maryland, then an active sailing port on the upper Potomac River (now part of the District of Columbia containing the new national capital Washington, D.C. after 1800). After running through Baltimore, the post road is now known as Washington Boulevard / U.S. Route 1. The earliest houses within today's boundaries of the pie-shaped wedge community of "Ridgely's Delight" date from about 1804. A large portion of the development of "Ridgely's Delight" occurred between 1816 and 1875, with particular intensity during the 1840s and 1850s. Ridgely was a slave owner.

He was the first of the family to reside north of Baltimore Town in the larger surrounding Baltimore County when he moved there in 1734. He became a gentleman by 1738, and esquire by 1748, and was styled "Charles The Merchant". Ridgely was a planter, merchant, ironmaster, and owner of a furnace and forges. Although his mercantile base was in Baltimore Town and Baltimore County, his interests extended south into neighboring Anne Arundel County where he purchased tobacco, crops, livestock, and slaves from at least 1736 through the 1740s.

In 1745, he acquired "Northampton", near future Towsontown / Towson, and was founder of the Ridgely family of "Hampton Mansion". By 1750, "Charles The Merchant" had taken up or purchased altogether 26 parcels in Baltimore and Anne Arundel Counties, aggregating 8,000 acres (32 km^{2}). These parcels were not all contiguous, and they included areas as distant as the present neighborhoods further south of Roland Park, Guilford and Blythewood in later northern Baltimore City.

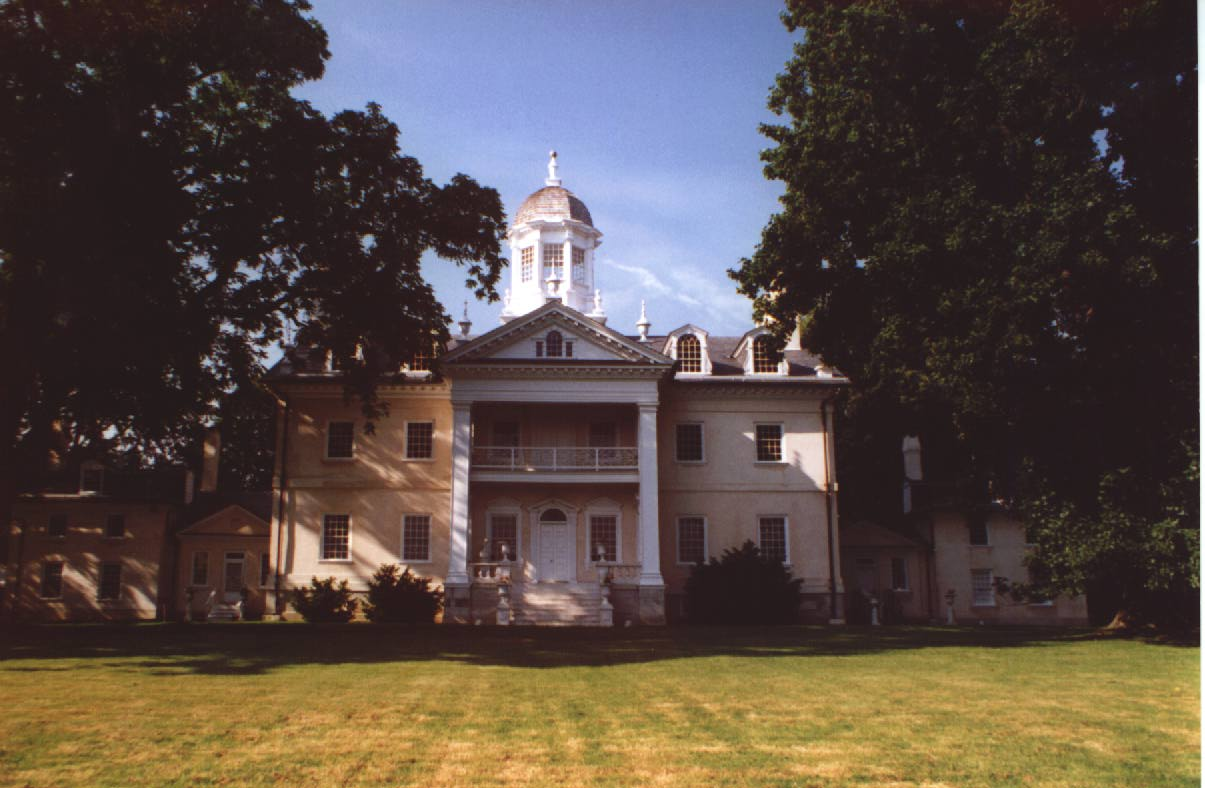
Hampton Mansion, near Towson, Baltimore County, Maryland, built by Charles Ridgely III (1733–1790), in 1783 to 1790.

It was "Northampton", which became the centerpiece for the Ridgely family setting. The tract of land was originally granted to Col. Henry Darnall, Sr. (1645–1711), who immigrated to Maryland from Hertfordshire, England. The 1500 acre (6 km^{2}) parcel was surveyed for Colonel Darnall in 1695. Colonel Darnall was Gov. Charles Calvert, and 3rd Lord Baltimore's (1637–1714) primary agent in Maryland for many years. The property was inherited by his daughter, Ann Hill (1680–1749) in 1745, in consideration of £600. In the early 1760s, Col. Ridgely established several large ironworks, which thrived from the easily mined deposits of iron ore in the area. The large mansion "Hampton Mansion" was built on the tract of land containing 10,000 acres (40 km^{2}), called "Northampton", after the end of the American Revolutionary War between 1783 and 1790 by Col. Ridgely's youngest son Captain Charles Ridgely III, known as "Charles The Mariner" (1733–1790), who died after its completion. "Hampton" is about 13 miles (21 km) due north of the city of Baltimore and about 2 miles (3.2 km) north of Towson (formerly Towsontown), the county seat since 1853 of Baltimore County.

== Second marriage ==
Ridgely married secondly on December 5, 1747, Lydia (Warfield) Stringer, widow of Dr. Samuel Stringer (d. 1747) of Queen Caroline Parish, Anne Arundel County. Lydia was the daughter of Richard Warfield III, Esq. (c. 1677 – 1755) and Ruth Crutchley (c. 1683 – 1713).

== Ironworks ==
In 1760 Ridgely and his two sons built Northampton Ironworks, which included a furnace on Patterson's Run and forges at Long Cam near Gunpowder Falls. Between November 1763 and April 1764, the ironworks shipped over 1,858 pounds worth of pig and bar iron to London.

== Death ==
At the time of his death in 1772, Ridgely's estate was valued at £6,285.16.9 British pounds sterling, then current money, including 36 slaves, 6 servants, 121 oz. plate, his one-third interest in the Northampton Ironworks valued at £322.9.3, and 603 pounds worth of goods shipped by London merchants. He died at "Northampton", (at future Hampton Mansion and near Towsontown/Towson), Baltimore County, Maryland, and his will was probated on June 8, 1772.

== Children ==
1. John Ridgely, Sr. (c. 1723–1771), who married Mary Dorsey (1725–1786), daughter of Caleb Dorsey (1685–1742) and Eleanor Warfield (1683–1752). Caleb was son of Hon. John Dorsey. They had issue.

2. Pleasance Ridgely (1724–1777), who married Lyde Goodwin (1718–1755).

3. Charles Ridgely (1727), who died young.

4. Achsah Ridgely (1729–1778), who married

1) Dr. Robert Holliday (died 1747).

2) John Carnan (1728–1767). Achsah and John Carnan were the parents of Charles Carnan Ridgely (1760–1829), whose uncle Capt. Charles Ridgely III (1733–1790), willed the estate of Hampton Mansion to, on the condition that he take the surname of Ridgely.

3) Daniel Chamier, a Tory merchant of Baltimore.

5. William Ridgely (c. 1731), who died young.

6. Capt. Charles Ridgely III, "Charles The Mariner" (1733–1790), builder of "Hampton Mansion" (future National Historic Site), who married Rebecca Dorsey (1738–1812), daughter of Caleb Dorsey, Jr. (1710–1772) and Priscilla Hill (1718–1782). Caleb was the grandson of Hon. John Dorsey.

7. Rachel Ridgely (1734–1813), who married Lt. Col. Darby Lux II (1737–1795), son of Capt. Darby Lux I (1695–1750) and Ann Saunders (1700–1785).

== Ancestry ==
Col. Ridgely II was the son of Charles Ridgely I, "Charles The Planter" (c. 1670 – 1705) and Deborah Dorsey (c. 1685 – 1752). Deborah married secondly Richard Clagett, Sr., of "Croome" (1681–1752).

Deborah was the daughter of Hon., Capt. John Dorsey (c. 1645 – 1715) of "Hockley", Anne Arundel County, and his wife Pleasance Ely (c. 1660 – 1734).

Charles I was the son of Henry Ridgely (1625–1710) and Elizabeth Howard (1637–1695).

== Sources ==
- Fendall, Douglas Allen. The Descendants of Governor Josias Fendall.
