= Bound for America: The Transportation of British Convicts to the Colonies =

1987 nonfiction book by A. Roger Ekirch

Bound for America: The Transportation of British Convicts to the Colonies, 1718-1775
- 2009 Book cover
- Author: A. Roger Ekirch
- Subject: History 18th century, Criminals transportation, Penal colonies
- Genre: History
- Set in: United Kingdom and United States
- Published: 1987, 1990, 1992
- Publisher: Clarendon Press
- Publication place: United States
- Media type: Print, E-book, Audio
- Pages: 277
- ISBN: 9780198200925
- OCLC: 15164779
- Website: Official website

Bound for America: The Transportation of British Convicts to the Colonies, 1718-1775 is a nonfiction historical book written by A. Roger Ekirch. It was originally published in 1987 and then reissued in 1990, and 1992 by Clarendon Press.

== Synopsis ==
This book examines the 18th century forced transportation of around 50,000 convicts to America who were sentenced for periods of seven, fourteen years, or life. This convict transportation began in 1718 following the passing of a Transportation Act by the British Parliament in 1717. The transportation continued until 1775, when the American Revolutionary War halted the practice. Also, Ekirch explores the various roles played by England, Ireland, Wales, and Scotland in this convict trade.
