= Darby Lux II =

American militiaman (1737–1795)

Lt. Col. Darby Lux II (1737–1795) was an active patriot of the American Revolution. Darby was the son of Capt. Darby Lux I (1695–1750) and Ann Saunders (1700–1785).

== Early career ==
Darby was born in Anne Arundel County in 1737. He resided in Baltimore Town until about 1753. He became a merchant in Barbados until about 1764, when he moved back and became a partner in the firm of Ridgely, Howard & Lux, and was involved with the Ridgely family ironworks. Prior to 1773, Darby was a dealer in convict servants from America to the West Indies, and a partner in the rum importing business with William Russell, brother of James Russell (1708–1788) in London. Lux also became involved in a lead mining operation in Baltimore County.

== American Revolution ==
Darby was an active patriot and was of the Gunpowder Battalion of Maryland Militia in 1775. Lt. Col. Lux was a member of the Committee of Observation and Safety in the same year. In November 1775 he was appointed by the Continental Congress on a secret Committee to secure arms and ammunition, and he was authorized to sign money. He was a signer of the Maryland Declaration of Independence on July 6, 1776.

Col. Lux inherited "Derbyshire" from his father. It was located on the Reistertown Road, 7 miles (11 km) from Baltimore. He resided at "Mt. Airy" near Towson, and this estate is now the Sheppard Pratt Asylum. At the time of his death on April 10, 1795, Darby had accumulated over 2,000 acres (8.1 km^{2}) of land in Baltimore County, where he died. His estate was valued at 1,027.19.5 pounds current money, including 24 slaves and 42 oz. plate.

== Marriage ==
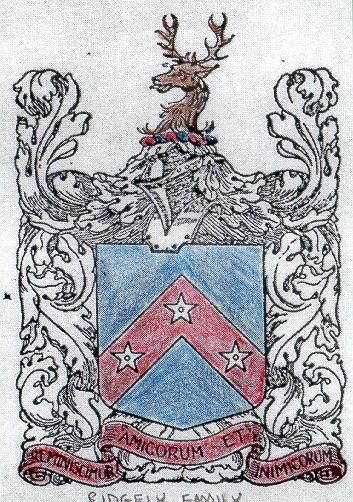
Ridgely coat of arms.

Darby married Rachel Ridgely (1734–1813). Rachel was born in Anne Arundel Co., Maryland on December 5, 1734, and died in Baltimore County in 1813.

Rachel, was the daughter of Col. Charles Ridgely II, "Charles The Merchant" (1702–1772) of "Ridgely’s Whim", and his first wife, Rachel Howard (ca. 1696–1750).

== Children ==
[Rachel Ridgely Lux (1762–1810), who married James McCormick Jr. (1763–1841).

1. Ann Lux (1770–1847), who married

1) George Risteau, Gent. (ca. 1763–1789) 2) Col. Thomas Deye Cockey Sr., Esq. (1762–1813).

1. Capt Darby Lux III (ca. 1772–1812), who on 20 Feb 1798 married Mary Nicholson, daughter of Col. Benjamin Nicholson Sr., Esq. (d. 1792).

== Ancestry ==
Darby II, was the son of Capt. Darby Lux I (1695–1750) and Ann Saunders (1700–1785).

Ann was the daughter of Robert Saunders (d. 1755) and Rebeckath Groom (d. 1752).

Capt. Darby Lux I, was the son of William Lux II, Vicar (ca. 1657–1714) and his wife Elizabeth.

William II, was the son of William Lux I and his wife Wilmot (d. 1703).
