= Ridgely's Delight, Baltimore =

- Ridgely's Delight Historic District
- U.S. National Register of Historic Places
- U.S. Historic district
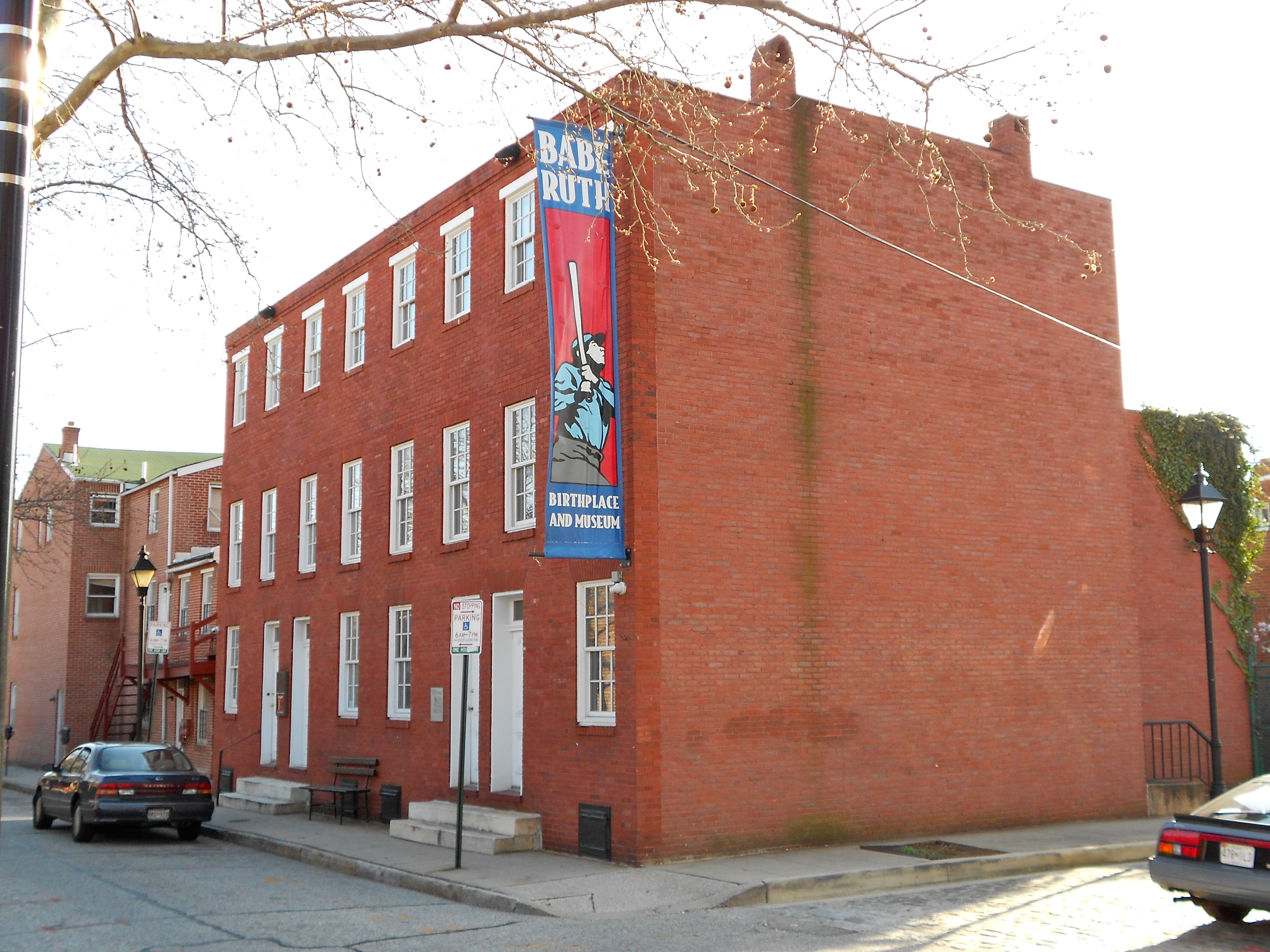
- The birthplace of Babe Ruth

- Location within Baltimore Location within Maryland Location within the United States
- Location: Roughly bounded by S. Fremont Ave., W. Pratt, Conway and Russell Sts., Baltimore, Maryland
- Coordinates: 39°17′8″N 76°37′31″W
- Area: 24 acres (9.7 ha)
- Built: 1823
- Architect: Multiple
- Architectural style: Italianate, Federal, Late Federal
- NRHP reference No.: 80001790
- Added to NRHP: June 6, 1980

Ridgely's Delight is a historic residential neighborhood in Baltimore, Maryland, United States. Its borders are formed by Russell and Greene streets to the east, West Pratt Street to the north, and Martin Luther King Jr. Boulevard from the western to southern tips. It is adjacent to the University of Maryland, Baltimore, Oriole Park at Camden Yards, and M&T Bank Stadium. It is situated a short walk from MARC Train and the Light Rail's Camden Station, which has made it a popular residence of Washington, D.C., and suburban Baltimore commuters. It is within a 5-minute walk of both Oriole Park at Camden Yards and M&T Bank Stadium and a 10-minute walk from Baltimore's historic Inner Harbor.

The land tract of Ridgely's Delight was surveyed in 1732 for Charles Ridgely.

In 1792, James McHenry purchased a 95-acre (38 ha) tract from Ridgely's Delight and named it Fayetteville in honor of his friend, the Marquis de Lafayette.

With its name derived from Charles Ridgely II's plantation Ridgely's Whim, Ridgely's Delight was originally inhabited by craftspeople but later became home to affluent professionals who used their resources to make the rowhouses more ornate.

Ridgely's Delight is the birthplace of Babe Ruth and home to the Babe Ruth Birthplace and Museum on Emory Street. Several bars and shops are located in the neighborhood.

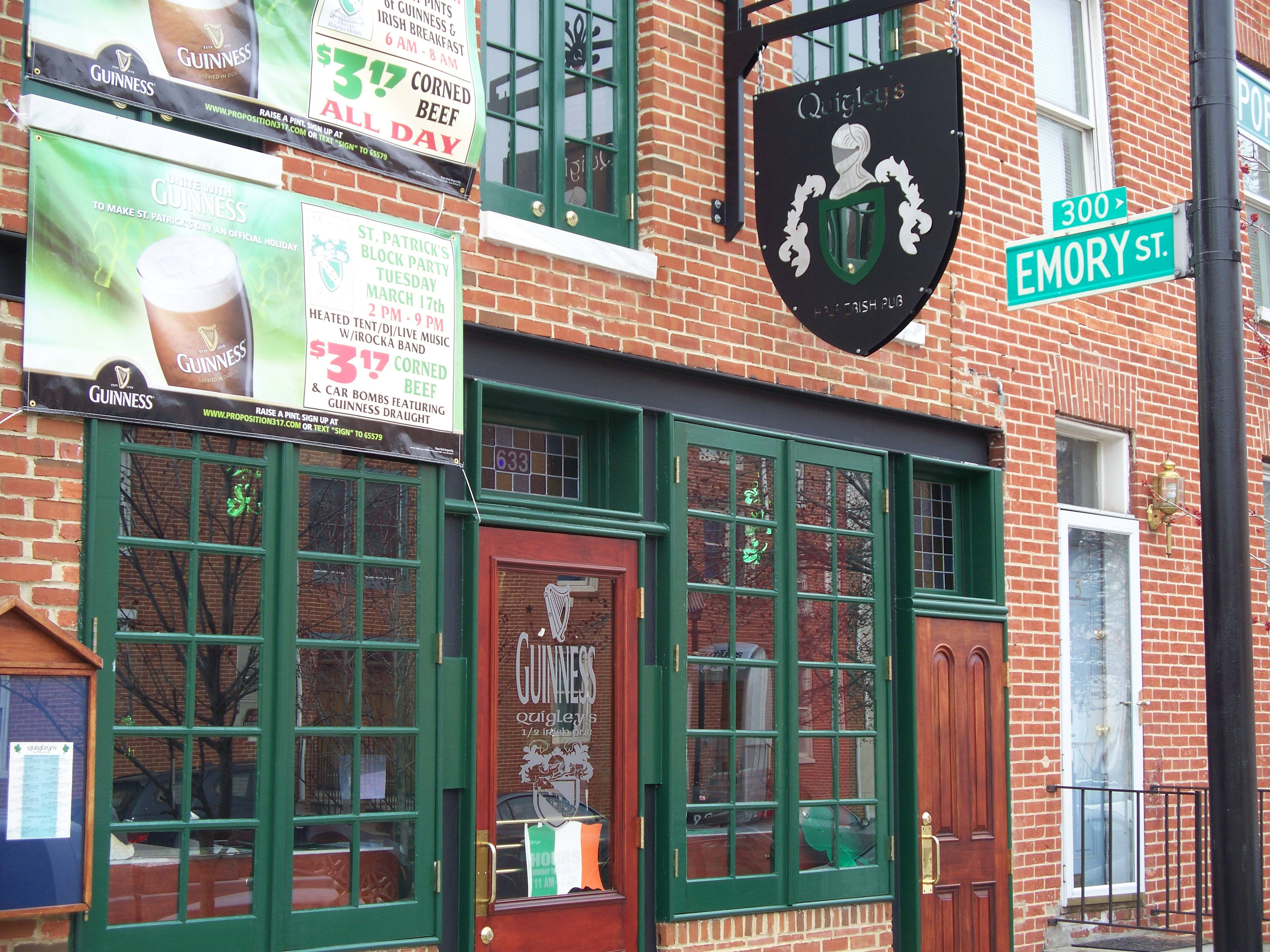
Quigley's Half-Irish pub, a neighborhood tavern located in Ridgely's Delight
