= Piracy Act 1717 =

Act of the Parliament of Great Britain

Piracy Act 1717 (Note: The citation of this act by this short title was authorised by section 1 of, and the first schedule to, the Short Titles Act 1896. Due to the repeal of those provisions it is now authorised by section 19(2) of the Interpretation Act 1978.)
- Act of Parliament
- Parliament of Great Britain
- Long title: An Act for the further preventing Robbery, Burglary, and other Felonies, and for the more effectual Transportation of Felons, and unlawful Exporters of Wool; and for declaring the Law upon some Points relating to Pirates.
- Citation: 4 Geo. 1. c. 11
- Territorial extent: England and Wales; British America; (Note: Section 8 and 9.)

Dates
- Royal assent: 21 March 1718
- Commencement: 21 November 1717 (Note: Start of session.)
- Repealed: 1 January 1968
Other legislation
Amended by	Transportation Act 1824
Repealed by	Criminal Statutes Repeal Act 1827; Criminal Law (India) Act 1828; Piracy Act 1837; Statute Law Revision Act 1887; Statute Law Revision Act 1948; Criminal Law Act 1967
Relates to	Robbery, etc. Act 1719

Status: Repealed

Text of statute as originally enacted

The Piracy Act 1717 (4 Geo. 1. c. 11), sometimes called the Transportation Act 1717 or the Felons' Act 1717 (1718 in New Style), was an act of the Parliament of Great Britain that established a regulated, bonded system to transport criminals to colonies in North America for indentured service, as a punishment for those convicted or attainted in Great Britain, excluding Scotland. The act established a seven-year transportation sentence as a punishment for people convicted of lesser felonies (those under the benefit of clergy), and a fourteen-year sentence for more serious crimes, in lieu of capital punishment. Completion of the sentence had the effect of a pardon; the punishment for returning before completion was death. It is commonly accepted that 30,000 convicts (women, men and children) may have been transported to the British American colonies, with some estimates going as high as 50,000.

The act established that merchants and others could contract transport convicts, after giving a surety bond that the transport would be made and the term of service would be completed. To accomplish this, the act declared that the contractor had a property and interest in the convict's transport and service. Significantly under section five, and after noting the many idle youth "lurking" about London and elsewhere, wanting employment, and otherwise tempted toward crime "if not provided for," the Transportation Act included that merchants and others could also contract with 15-20 year-olds, who were willing to be transported and serve up to eight years indentured service. Other sections of the act imposed stricter measures against fencing stolen goods, making them fourteen-year sentences instead of mere accessories to theft; imposed a seven-year transportation sentence for those imprisoned for, or breaking, the long-time prohibition on exporting wool in violation of the Acts of Trade.

== Development and passage ==
Although the sentence of transportation with the royal prerogative of mercy had been granted as an alternative to a death sentence for a century, its usage was irregular and subject to abuse. Several sections of the Habeas Corpus Act 1679 (31 Cha. 2. c. 2), as originally passed, contained provisions related to its then-current usage. , The bill for the act was introduced into the House of Commons in 1717 under the Whig government by William Thomson, the Solicitor General, who became "the architect of the transportation policy" as developed under the act. The act mandated transportation as a direct sentence, thus simplifying and hastening the process of criminal sentencing.

The reasons for passing the act, as stated in the preamble, include the insufficiently effective sentencing, recidivism, the fact that many offenders previously extended this mercy had not transported themselves, "and whereas in many of his Majesty's colonies and plantations in America, there is great want of servants, who by their hard labour and industry might be the means of improving and making the said colonies and plantations more useful to this nation." The passage also derived from the convergence of a number of events at the time, including fears over rising crime and disorder, following the discharge of soldiers after the end of the War of the Spanish Succession in 1714, a contested Hanoverian accession to the British throne, inappropriate punishments for lesser felonies (misdemeanours), concern over crowd behaviour at public punishments, and a new determination by parliament to push through the legislation despite colonial opposition. Transportation thus became a regularly available and normal sentence for the courts to hand down to those convicted of non-capital offences as well as capital crimes.

== Provisions ==
The Criminal Statutes Repeal Act 1827 (7 & 8 Geo. 4. c. 27) repealed the whole of the act as to England and as to offences committed within the jurisdiction of the admiralty of England, except so much thereof as related to the trial of piracy, felony or robbery committed within the admiralty jurisdiction. The effect of this was to repeal the whole act, except section 7.

=== Section 7 ===
Unrelated to transportation, section 7 concerns the suppression of piracy. The death penalty for most kinds of piracy was abolished by the Piracy Act 1837 (7 Will. 4 & 1 Vict. c. 88), which preserved the death penalty for piracy with intent to kill.

The words from "and shall and ought" to the end were repealed by section 1 of, and the first schedule to, the Statute Law Revision Act 1948 (11 & 12 Geo. 6. c. 62). Section 7 of the act was repealed by section 10(2) of, and part I of schedule 3 to, the Criminal Law Act 1967, which came into force on 1 January 1968.

== Later acts and general results ==
Following the initial passage of the act, several other statutes regulating and related to the penal transportation system to America were passed. The Robbery, etc. Act 1719 (6 Geo. 1. c. 23) amended the previous Act, authorized payments by the state to the merchants who contracted to take the convicts to America, and broadened the types of crimes subject to transportation. The Return of Offenders from Transportation Act 1742 (16 Geo. 2. c. 15) reinforced the death penalty for transportees returning early. Following the Jacobite rising of 1745, the Traitors Transported Act 1746 (20 Geo. 2. c. 46) was passed, among other things, to deal mercifully with many of those detained. The Transportation Act 1768 (8 Geo. 3. c. 15) was passed to make the existing transportation process faster and more effectual.

The act, with the system that developed in North America, are generally considered a success; it became a popular method for criminal punishment, as well as for dealing with the poorer and younger elements of British urban society at the time. One reason for the success of the act was that it obviated the financially costly voyage itself; the existing system of sponsorship by merchants had not worked effectively and needed improvement. The government eventually accepted Thomson's proposal to pay merchants to transport convicts, with the Treasury contracting London merchant Jonathan Forward. The business was entrusted to Forward in 1718. Initially he was paid £3 for each prisoner transported, but the price was raised to £5 in 1727. Despite some complaints from colonial governments, the system was favoured by the British government. In exchange for relatively small monetary subsidies, contractors relieved the government of convict maintenance costs. Contractors then sold transported prisoners in labour-starved colonial markets, such as the Chesapeake, for an average price of £10.

== Suspension and significance ==
As thus developed, the established system for transporting convicts to the British American colonies continued until 1776 when its use was temporarily suspended by the Criminal Law Act 1776 (16 Geo. 3. c. 43). The outbreak of the American Revolution had made continuing transportation there unfeasible, and recently illegal. The last convict ship to depart Britain docked in Virginia in April that year. Under the Criminal Law Act, felons continued to be sentenced to transportation, but with no place to go, were liable instead to a sentence at hard labour until alternative provisions could be made. The rebellion and the end of transport to America in part prompted the British use of prisons for punishment and the start of prison building programs (as opposed to the use of gaols related to trial or sentencing) because the important transportation alternative to the death penalty had been removed. The Criminal Law Act is also referred to as the "Hard Labour Act" and the "Hulks Act" due to the change in punishment and the overcrowded conditions that resulted While initially suspended for two years by the 1776 act, it would be continued until 1779 by the Criminal Law Act 1778 (18 Geo. 3. c. 62) and the Criminal Law Act 1779 (19 Geo. 3. c. 54), with little resolution of the developing accommodation problems.

This situation would continue without any resolution until orders in council on 6 December 1785 which mandated the establishment of a penal colony in New South Wales. In 1787 British transportation of criminals resumed with the departure of the First Fleet to colonies being established in Australia; its usage would be greatly reduced in the 1850s, but continue until the last arrived in 1868.

== See also ==
- Convicts in Australia
- Indentured servitude in the Americas
- Penitentiary Act
- The Fortunes and Misfortunes of the Famous Moll Flanders
- Redemptioner
- Piracy in Scotland
- Bound for America by A. Roger Ekirch
