= Roger Ekirch =

American historian (born 1950)

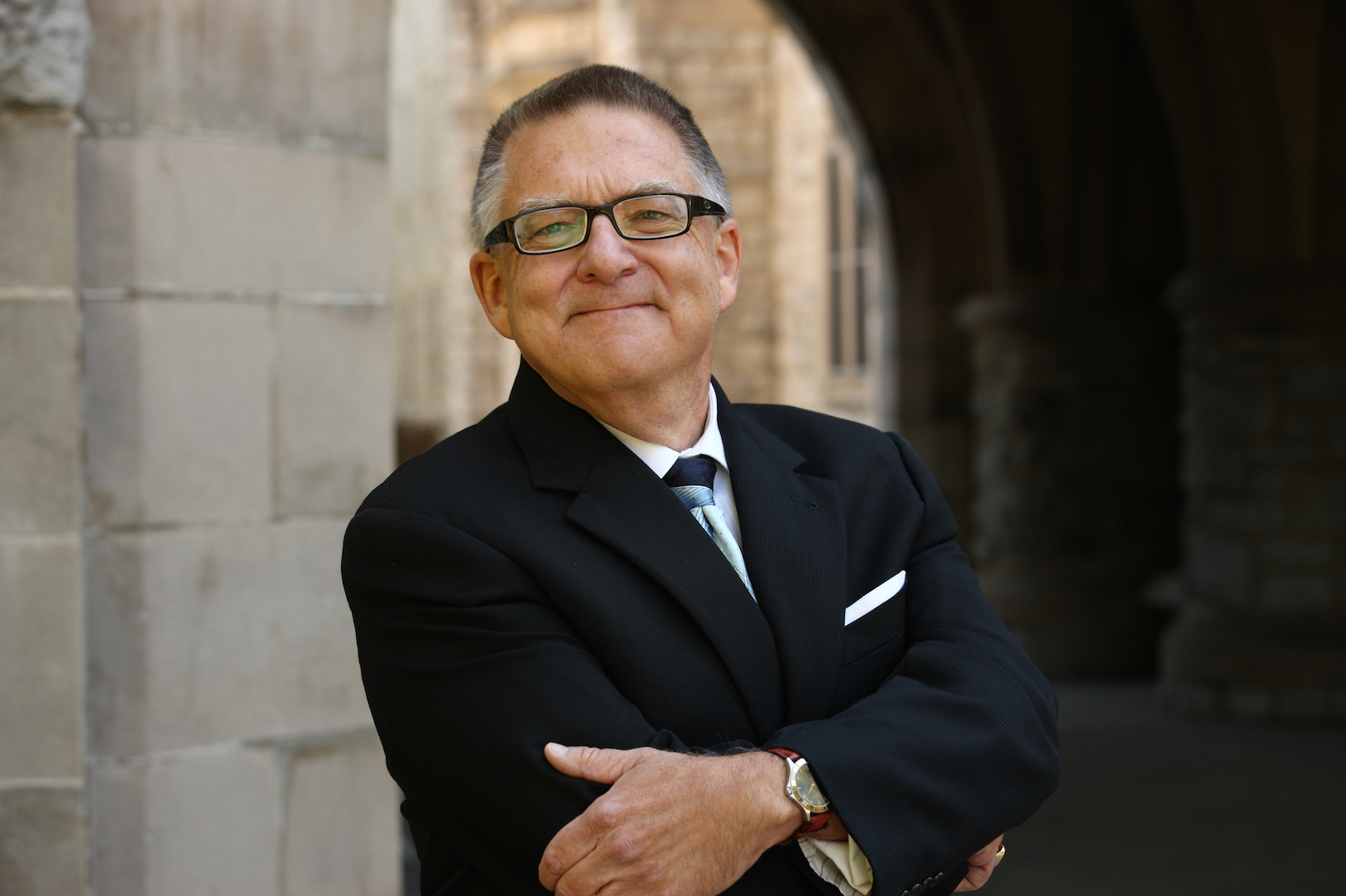
- Ekirch in 2012
- Born: February 6, 1950 (age 76); Washington, D.C., U.S.

Academic work
- Discipline: Historian
- Institutions: Virginia Tech

Arthur Roger Ekirch (born February 6, 1950) is University Distinguished Professor of history at Virginia Tech in the United States. He was a Guggenheim fellow in 1998.

The son of intellectual historian Arthur A. Ekirch Jr. and Dorothy Gustafson, Roger Ekirch is internationally known for his pioneering research into pre-industrial sleeping patterns that was first published in "Sleep We Have Lost: Pre-Industrial Slumber in the British Isles" and later in his award-winning 2005 book At Day's Close: Night in Times Past.

== Selected publications ==
=== Books ===
- "Poor Carolina": Politics and society in Colonial North Carolina, 1729–1776, University of North Carolina Press, 1981.
- Bound for America: The Transportation of British Convicts to the Colonies, 1718–1775, Oxford University Press, 1987.
- At Day's Close: Night in Times Past, W.W. Norton, 2005.
- Birthright: The True Story of the Kidnapping of Jemmy Annesley, W.W. Norton, 2010.
- American Sanctuary: Mutiny, Martyrdom, and National Identity in the Age of Revolution, Pantheon, 2017.
- La Grande Transformation du Sommeil: Comment la Revolution Industrielle a Bouleversé Nos Nuits, Editions Amersterdam, 2021.

=== Articles ===
- "Sleep We Have Lost: Pre-Industrial Slumber in the British Isles", The American Historical Review, 2001.
- "The Modernization of Western Slumber: Or, Does Insomnia Have a History?", Past & Present, 2015.
- "Segmented Sleep in Preindustrial Societies", Sleep, 2016.
- "What Sleep Research Can Learn From History", Sleep Health, 2018.

== See also ==
- Biphasic and polyphasic sleep
