= Jonathan Forward =

- Born: 1680; England
- Died: 1760 (aged 79–80); London
- Occupation: Merchant
- Spouse: Susannah
- Children: Elizabeth

Jonathan Forward (1680–1760) was a London merchant primarily responsible for convict transportation to the American colonies from 1718 to 1739. In accordance with the Transportation Act 1717, Forward was contracted to transport felons from Newgate Prison and from numerous home counties.

== Marriage ==
Forward married Susannah before 1712. Daughter, Elizabeth, was born in 1712 and died in 1789. On 19 December 1734, Elizabeth married Robert Byng, fourth son of Rear-Admiral George Byng, 1st Viscount Torrington.

== Career ==
Jonathan Forward officially became a convict transport merchant in 1718. Entrepreneurial Forward worked with the government to support the British crown with transportation fees. Forward contracted with plantation owners in the colonies to receive indentured servants and convicts to work their properties. "The proposal of Jonathan Forward, merchant, for transporting felons [is read]. The proposer may take them gratis and transport them for his own advant[age]."

Forward contracted the services of numerous ships, captains, and crews to facilitate convict transportation. Among his most reliable captains was Darby Lux I commanded several ships from Anne Arundel County to Great Britain carrying tobacco on consignment to Forward. Lux's ships contracted for convict transport to Maryland included: Gilbert, 1720-1722; Jonathan, 1723-1724; Patapsco Merchant, 1732; and Genoa Galley, 1738.

Forward continued as sole convict transportation contractor until 1739, when he chose to retire after more than twenty years. "Andrew Reid, of London, merchant, is to be the transporter of felons loco Jonathan Forward, and the contract to be made with him for that purpose is to be for 3 years certain."

== Death ==
Jonathan Forward died in 1760 and was buried in London.

== Children ==
Jonathan and Susannah Forward had two daughters. One was Elizabeth, christened on 15 May 1712. The second was an unnamed girl.
