= Outline of George Washington =

First President of the United States

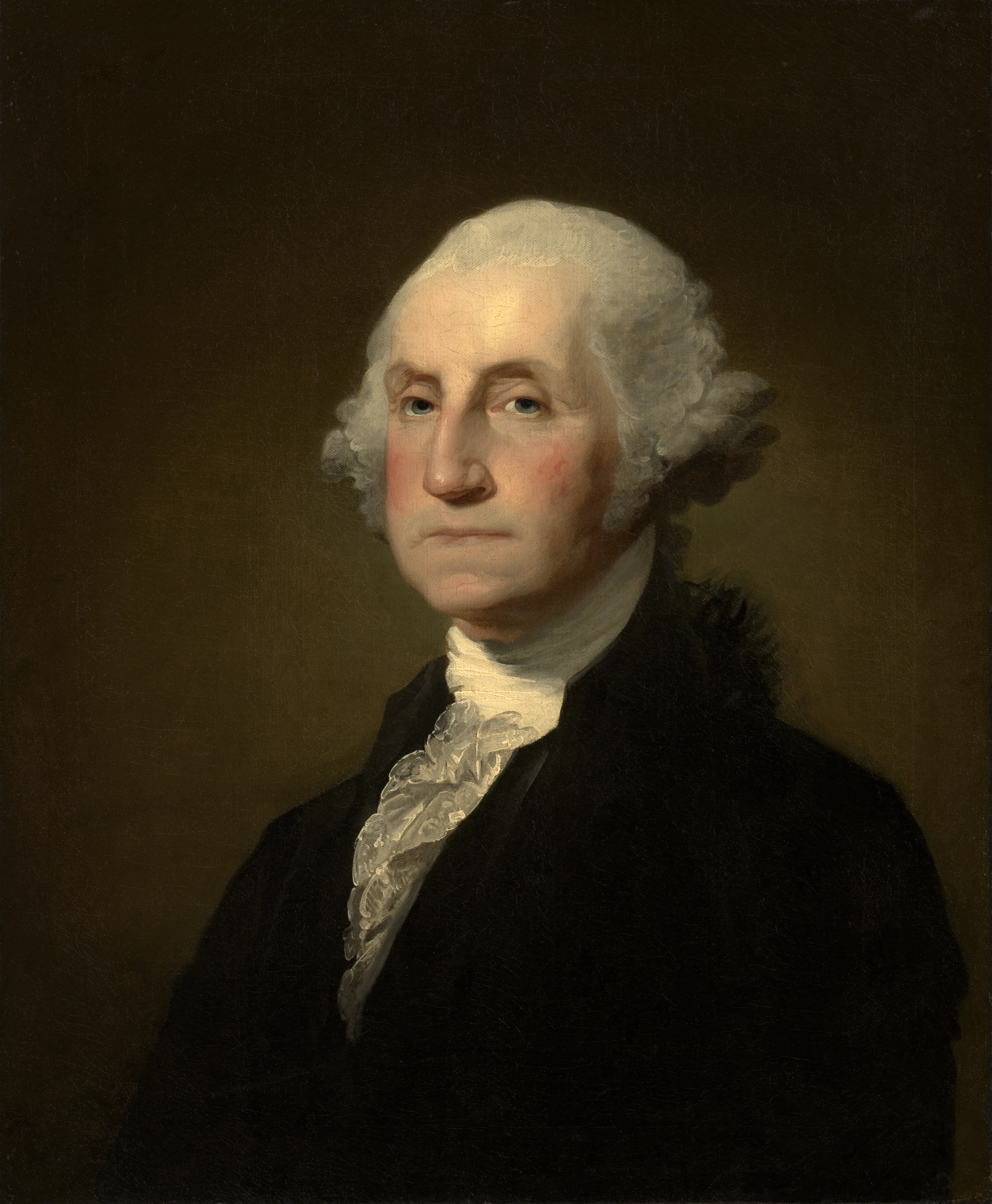
George Washington by Gilbert Stuart, c. 1803

The following outline is provided as an overview of and topical guide to George Washington:

George Washington (February 22, 1732 [O.S. February 11, 1731] – December 14, 1799) was a Founding Father and the first president of the United States, serving from 1789 to 1797. As commander of the Continental Army, Washington led Patriot forces to victory in the American Revolutionary War against the British Empire. He is commonly known as the Father of His Country for his role in bringing about American independence.

== Military career of George Washington ==
Military career of George Washington

- Colonel, Virginia militia
- French and Indian War
  - George Washington in the French and Indian War
    - Lieutenant colonel, Virginia Regiment – Washington's first military commission
    - Battle of Jumonville Glen
    - Battle of Fort Necessity – Washington's first military battle experience
      - Fort Necessity National Battlefield
    - Braddock Expedition
    - Battle of the Monongahela
    - Forbes Expedition
- American Revolutionary War (outline) (timeline)
  - George Washington in the American Revolution
    - Commander-in-Chief/Commanding General, Continental Army
      - Commander-in-Chief's Guard
      - Knowlton's Rangers – An espionage detachment of the Continental Army established by George Washington.
    - Boston campaign
      - Siege of Boston
    - New York and New Jersey campaign
      - Landing at Kip's Bay
      - Battle of Long Island
      - Battle of Harlem Heights – Washington's first battlefield success of the Revolutionary War.
      - Battle of White Plains
      - Battle of Fort Washington
      - Battle of Fort Lee
      - Crossing of the Delaware River
      - Battle of Trenton
      - Battle of the Assunpink Creek
      - Battle of Princeton
      - Forage War
    - Philadelphia campaign
      - Battle of Brandywine
      - Battle of the Clouds
      - Battle of Germantown
      - Battle of White Marsh
      - Valley Forge
      - Conway Cabal
      - Battle of Monmouth
    - Battles of Saratoga
    - Yorktown campaign
      - Siege of Yorktown
    - Asgill Affair
    - Newburgh Conspiracy
      - Newburgh letter
      - Newburgh address
    - Evacuation Day
    - George Washington's resignation as commander-in-chief
      - Fraunces Tavern
    - Established the Badge of Military Merit
      - Purple Heart
    - Culper spy ring
    - Washington's Aides-de-Camp
      - Alexander Hamilton
      - John Laurens
      - John Trumbull
    - Washington's Headquarters during the Revolutionary War
      - Cumberland, Maryland
      - Morristown
      - Ford Mansion
    - Washington's tent
    - Washington's horses
      - Nelson
      - Blueskin
- Northwest Indian War
- Whiskey Rebellion
- Quasi-War
  - Lieutenant General, United States Army
- General of the Armies – promoted posthumously in 1976 by Congress

== Political career of George Washington ==
=== Political philosophy and views of George Washington ===
- Religious views of George Washington
- George Washington and slavery

=== Electoral history of George Washington ===
Electoral history of George Washington

- 1788–89 United States presidential election
- 1792 United States presidential election
- 1796 United States presidential election – Two electors voted for him despite Washington not campaigning and retiring after two terms

=== Washington's role in the founding of the United States ===
Founding Fathers of the United States

- 1769 Virginia Association
- 1774 Fairfax Resolves
- First Continental Congress
- Continental Association
- Second Virginia Convention
- Second Continental Congress
- 1785 Mount Vernon Conference
- Chairman of the 1787 Constitutional Convention
- Court of Appeals in Cases of Capture

=== Presidency of George Washington ===
Washington cabinet
| Office | Name | Term |
| President | George Washington | 1789–1797 |
| Vice President | John Adams | 1789–1797 |
| Secretary of State | John Jay | 1789–1790 |
| Thomas Jefferson | 1790–1793 |
| Edmund Randolph | 1794–1795 |
| Timothy Pickering | 1795–1797 |
| Secretary of the Treasury | Alexander Hamilton | 1789–1795 |
| Oliver Wolcott Jr. | 1795–1797 |
| Secretary of War | Henry Knox | 1789–1794 |
| Timothy Pickering | 1794–1796 |
| James McHenry | 1796–1797 |
| Attorney General | Edmund Randolph | 1789–1794 |
| William Bradford | 1794–1795 |
| Charles Lee | 1795–1797 |

Presidency of George Washington (timeline)

==== Events during George Washington's presidency ====
- First inauguration of George Washington
  - George Washington's reception at Trenton – during his journey to the first inauguration
  - Inaugural bible
  - Robert R. Livingston – lawyer, administered the oath of office
- Title of "Mr. President"
- Washington's cabinet
  - Cabinet of the United States
    - Secretary of State
    - Attorney General
    - Secretary of the Treasury
    - Secretary of War
- Established the Department of Foreign Affairs (later renamed the Department of State), Department of War, Department of the Treasury
- Helped charter the First Bank of the United States
- Second inauguration of George Washington
  - William Cushing – associate Supreme Court justice, administered the oath of office
- United States Capitol cornerstone laying
- List of federal judges appointed by George Washington
- People pardoned or granted clemency by George Washington

===== Legislation passed =====
- An Act to regulate the Time and Manner of administering certain Oaths
- Tariff of 1789
- Regulation of the Collection of Duties on Tonnage and Merchandise, which established the United States Customs Service
- Judiciary Act of 1789, which established the federal judiciary and the office of Attorney General
- Thanksgiving Proclamation
- Naturalization Act of 1790
- Patent Act of 1790
- Crimes Act of 1790
- Copyright Act of 1790
- Residence Act, a part of the Compromise of 1790, it established Washington D.C. as the seat of government of the United States
- Nonintercourse Act, the first of six statues for regulating commerce with Indigenous tribes
- Funding Act of 1790, a part of the Compromise of 1790, it authorized the assumption of state debt
- Collection of Duties Act, which established the United States Revenue Cutter Service (which was later merged with the United States Life-Saving Service to form the United States Coast Guard)
- Tariff of 1790
- Tariff of 1791, which led to the Whiskey Rebellion
  - Militia Acts of 1792
- Coinage Act of 1792
  - United States Mint
- Slave Trade Act of 1794
- Proclamation of Neutrality
  - Neutrality Act of 1794
- Jay Treaty
- Pinckney's Treaty

=== George Washington's notable speeches ===
- Acceptance of Command of the Continental Army (1775)
- Newburgh address (1783)
- First Inaugural Address (1789)
- National Thanksgiving Proclamation (1789)
- 1790 State of the Union Address (January)
- 1790 State of the Union Address (December)
- 1791 State of the Union Address
- 1792 State of the Union Address
- Second Inaugural Address (1793)
- 1793 State of the Union Address
- 1794 State of the Union Address
- 1795 State of the Union Address
- 1796 State of the Union Address
- Farewell Address
- More...

=== Post-presidency of George Washington ===
Post-presidency of George Washington

- Quasi-War

== Personal life of George Washington ==
- Religious views of George Washington
- George Washington and slavery
- Coat of arms of the Washington family

=== Family of George Washington ===
Coat of arms of the Washington family

Washington family

- George Reade (colonial governor) – great-great grandfather
- Lawrence Washington (1602–1653) – great grandfather
- John Washington – great-grandfather
- Lawrence Washington (1659–1698) – grandfather
- Mildred Gale – grandmother
- Augustine Washington – father
- Mary Ball – mother
- Martha Dandridge Custis Washington – wife
- Samuel Washington – brother
- John A. Washington – brother
- Charles Washington – brother
- Betty Washington Lewis – sister
- Lawrence Washington (1718–1752) – half-brother
- Bushrod Washington – nephew
- Lawrence Augustine Washington (1774–1824) – nephew
- Augustine Washington Jr. – half-brother
- John Parke Custis – stepson
- George Washington Parke Custis – step-grandson, adopted son
- Eleanor Parke Custis – step-granddaughter, adopted daughter

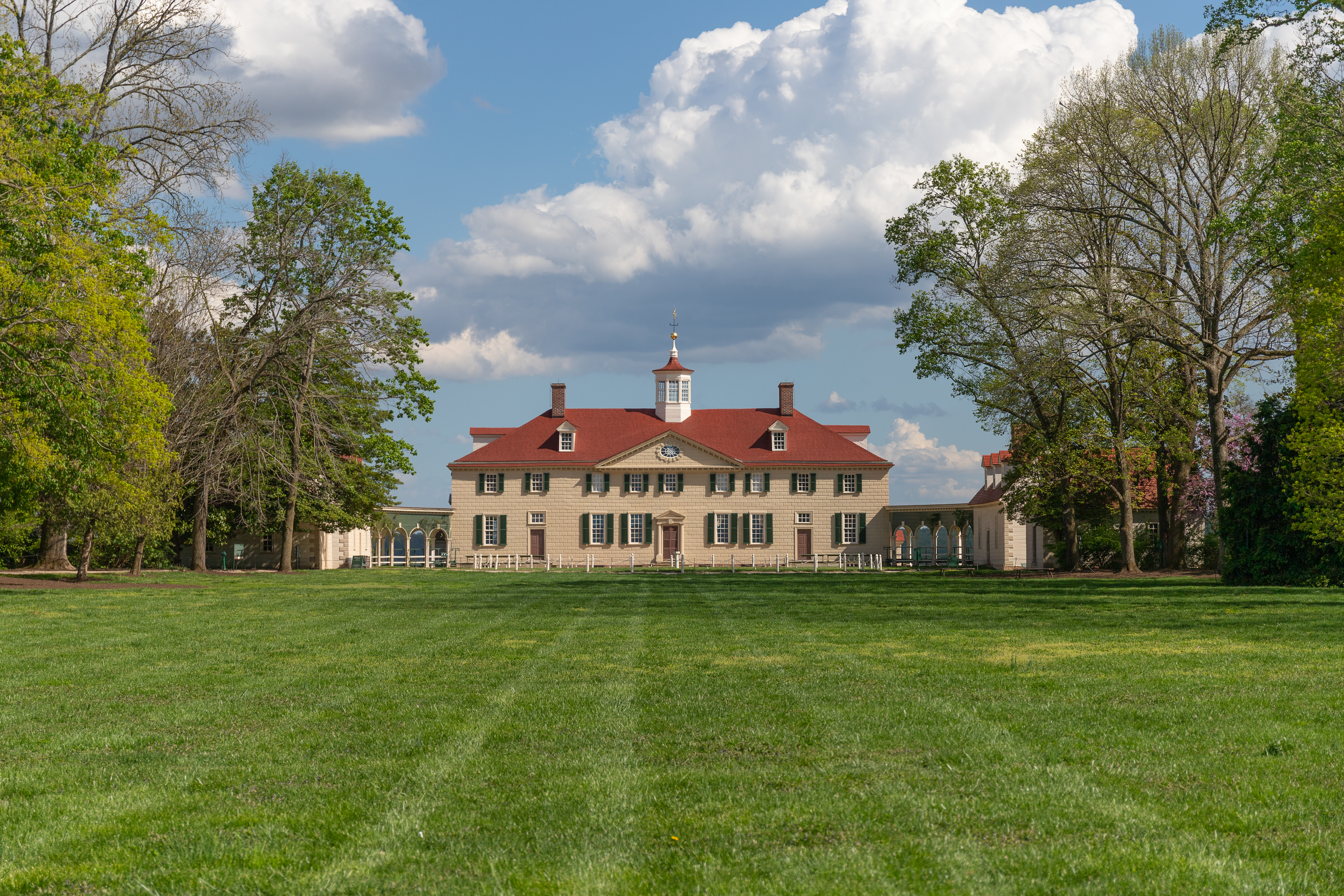
Mount Vernon, former residence and plantation of George Washington

=== Homes and places ===
- Early life
- Birthplace
- Ferry Farm boyhood home
- 1751 Barbados trip
- River Farm – acquired in 1960
- Mount Vernon – inherited remainder interest from Lawrence Washington in 1752, became sole owner in 1761
  - Fishery
  - Gristmill
  - Woodlawn Plantation
  - Whiskey distillery
- Samuel Osgood House, First Presidential Mansion
- Alexander Macomb House, Second Presidential Mansion
- President's House, Philadelphia, Third Presidential Mansion
- Germantown White House
- Custis estate
- Potomac Company
- James River and Kanawha Canal

=== Washington and slavery ===
Washington and slavery

- List of enslaved people of Mount Vernon
  - Betty
  - Caroline Branham
  - William Costin
  - West Ford
  - Sarah Johnson
  - Oney Judge
  - Philip Lee
  - William Lee
  - Hercules Posey
  - Christopher Sheels
  - Deborah Squash
  - Harry Washington

== George Washington's legacy ==
Legacy of George Washington

- Attempted theft of George Washington's skull
- Bibliography of George Washington
- Conotocaurius (Town Destroyer)
- Credited as the Father of the American Foxhound, Father of His Country/Father of America
- General of the Armies
- George Washington's teeth
- Virginia dynasty

=== Awards established by George Washington ===
==== Congressional ====
- Congressional Gold Medal

==== Military ====
- Badge of Military Merit
  - Purple Heart
- Certificate of Merit Medal
- The Papers of George Washington

=== Awards received by George Washington ===
- Thanks of Congress
- Washington Before Boston Medal – the first Congressional Gold Medal, presented by the Second Continental Congress.

=== Awards named in honour of George Washington ===
- George Washington Book Prize
- George Washington Honor Medal
- George Washington Spymaster Award

=== Companies and societies George Washington founded ===
- Honorary president, James River Company
- Mountain Road Lottery
- President, Potomac Company
- President General, Society of the Cincinnati

=== Cultural depictions of George Washington ===
Cultural depictions of George Washington

- Cherry-tree anecdote

==== Washington's image on money ====
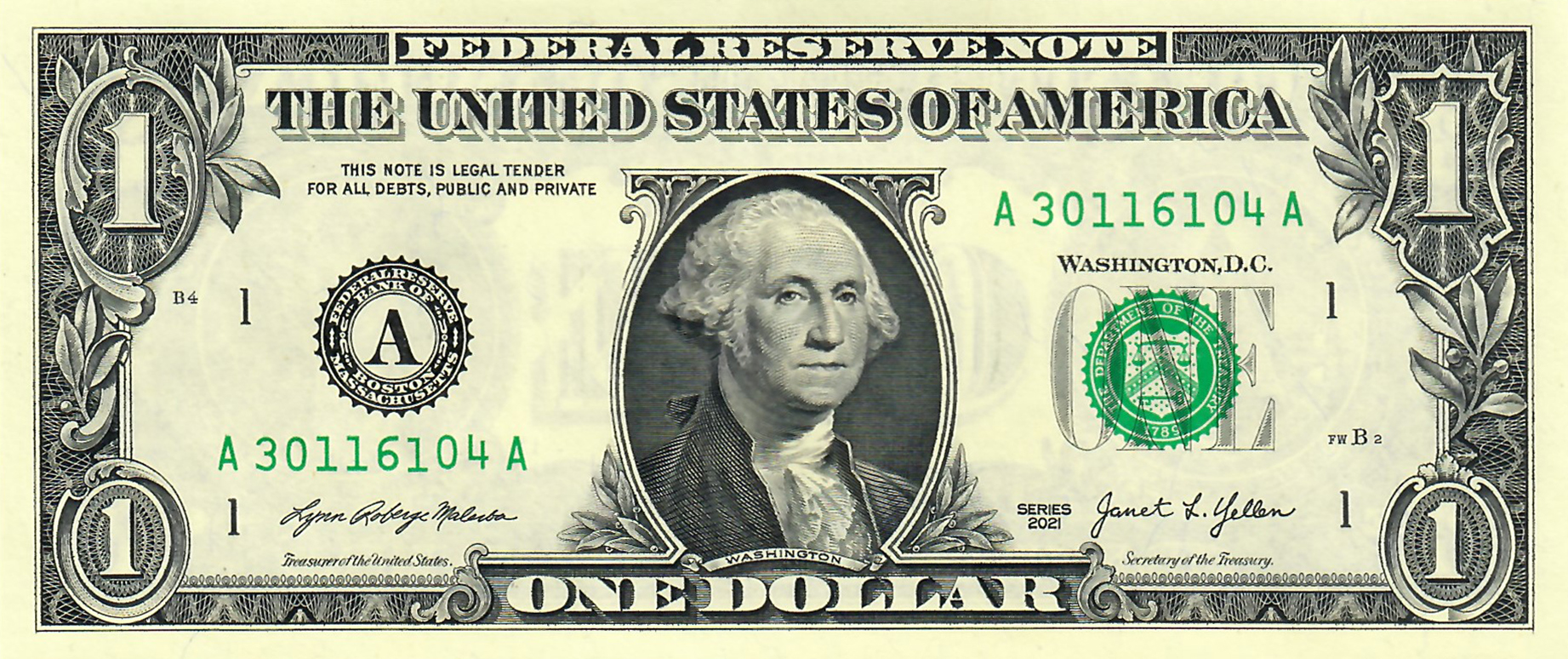
United States one-dollar bill

- United States one-dollar bill
- Quarter coin
- U.S. postage stamps
- Other currency

==== Films about Washington ====
- George Washington (1984 miniseries)
- George Washington II: The Forging of a Nation (1986 sequel)
- The Crossing (2000 film)
- Washington (2020 miniseries)

=== Memorials to and monuments of George Washington ===
Memorials to George Washington

- Evacuation Day (New York) – mainly commemorating the end of the American Revolution, a statue of George Washington was unveiled as part of the celebrations
- Washington's Birthday (Presidents' Day)

==== Places ====
- Washington state
- Washington, D.C.
- Fred W. Smith National Library for the Study of George Washington
- George Washington University
- George Washington Bridge
- George Washington Memorial Parkway
- Washington and Jefferson National Forests
- Washington and Lee University
- Washington College
- Washington's Crossing
- Washington University
- Washington (tree)

==== Monuments to George Washington ====
- Mount Rushmore
- Washington Masonic National Memorial
- Washington Monument
- Washington Monument, Baltimore
- Washington Monument, Boonsboro
- Washington Monument, Philadelphia

==== Statues of George Washington ====
List of statues of George Washington

- George Washington – marble bust portrait by Giuseppe Ceracchi
- George Washington – statue by Jean-Antoine Houdon
- Point of View – statue by James A. West
- Washington, D.C. statue – statue by Clark Mills
- George Washington – marble statue in Trenton

==== Paintings of Washington ====
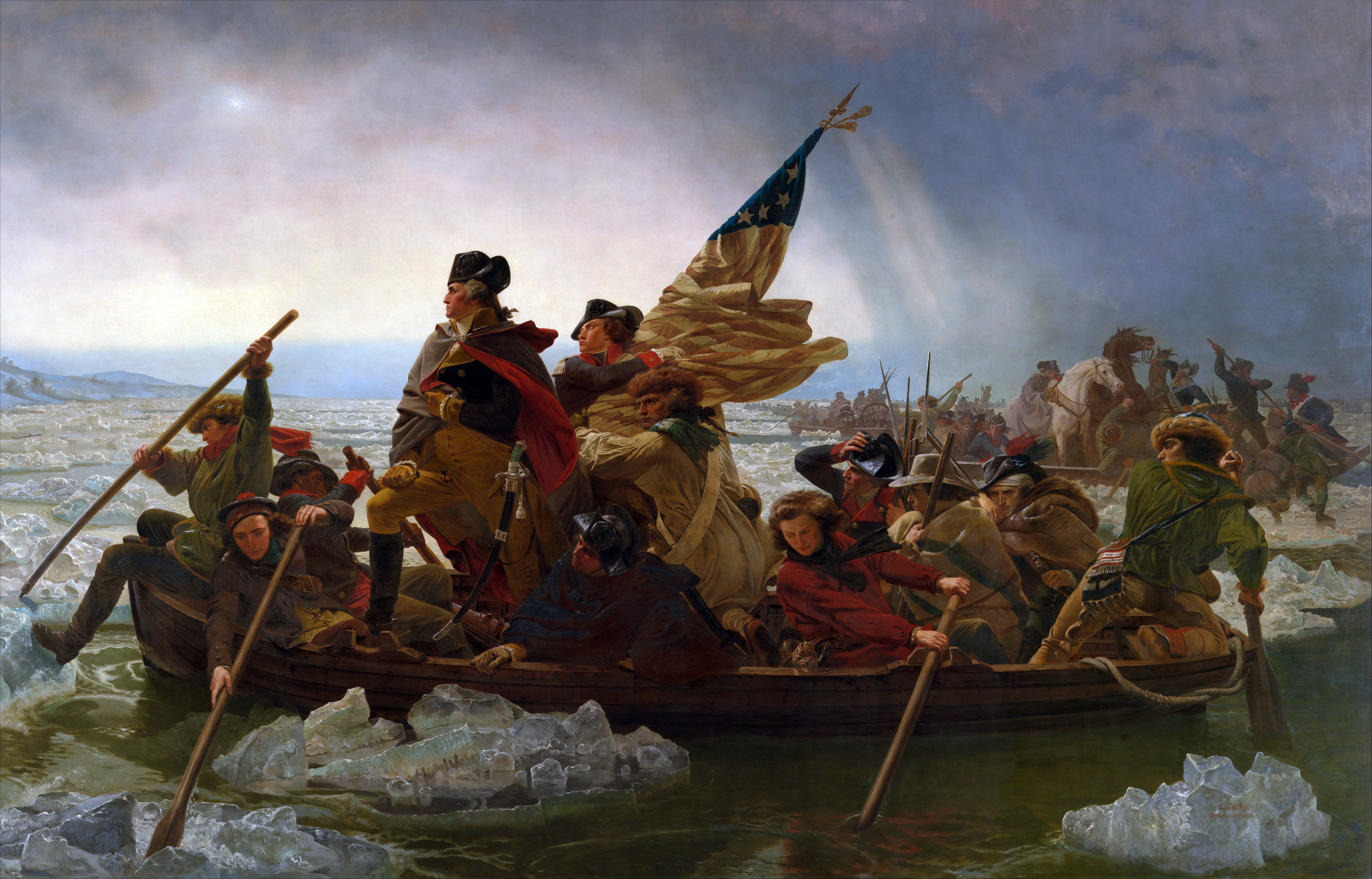
Washington Crossing the Delaware by Emanuel Leutze

List of paintings of George Washington

- Athenaeum Portrait – unfinished painting by Gilbert Stuart
- George Washington as Colonel in the Virginia Regiment – painting by Charles Willson Peale
- General George Washington at Trenton – portrait by John Trumbull
- General George Washington Resigning His Commission – painting by John Trumbull
- George Washington and William Lee – portrait by John Trumbull
- Gibbs-Channing-Avery Portrait – 1795 painting by Gilbert Stuart
- Lansdowne Portrait – painting by Gilbert Stuart
- Reception to Washington on April 21, 1789, at Trenton on his way to New York to Assume the Duties of the Presidency of the United States – painting by Newell Convers Wyeth
- Scene at the Signing of the Constitution of the United States – painting by Howard Chandler Christy
- The Apotheosis of Washington – 1865 fresco of Washington on the ceiling of the U.S. Capitol Building, by Constantino Brumidi
- The Passage of the Delaware – painting by Thomas Sully
- The Washington Family – portrait by Edward Savage
- Vaughan Portrait – 1795 painting by Gilbert Stuart
- Washington and the Departure of the British Garrison from New York City – painting by John Trumbull
- Washington at Princeton – painting by Charles Willson Peale
- Washington at Verplanck's Point – portrait by John Trumbull
- Washington Crossing the Delaware (1851 paintings) – three paintings by Emanuel Leutze
- Washington Crossing the Delaware (1953 painting) – painting by Larry Rivers
- U.S. Postage stamps
  - Washington-Franklin Issues
  - 1932 bicentennial

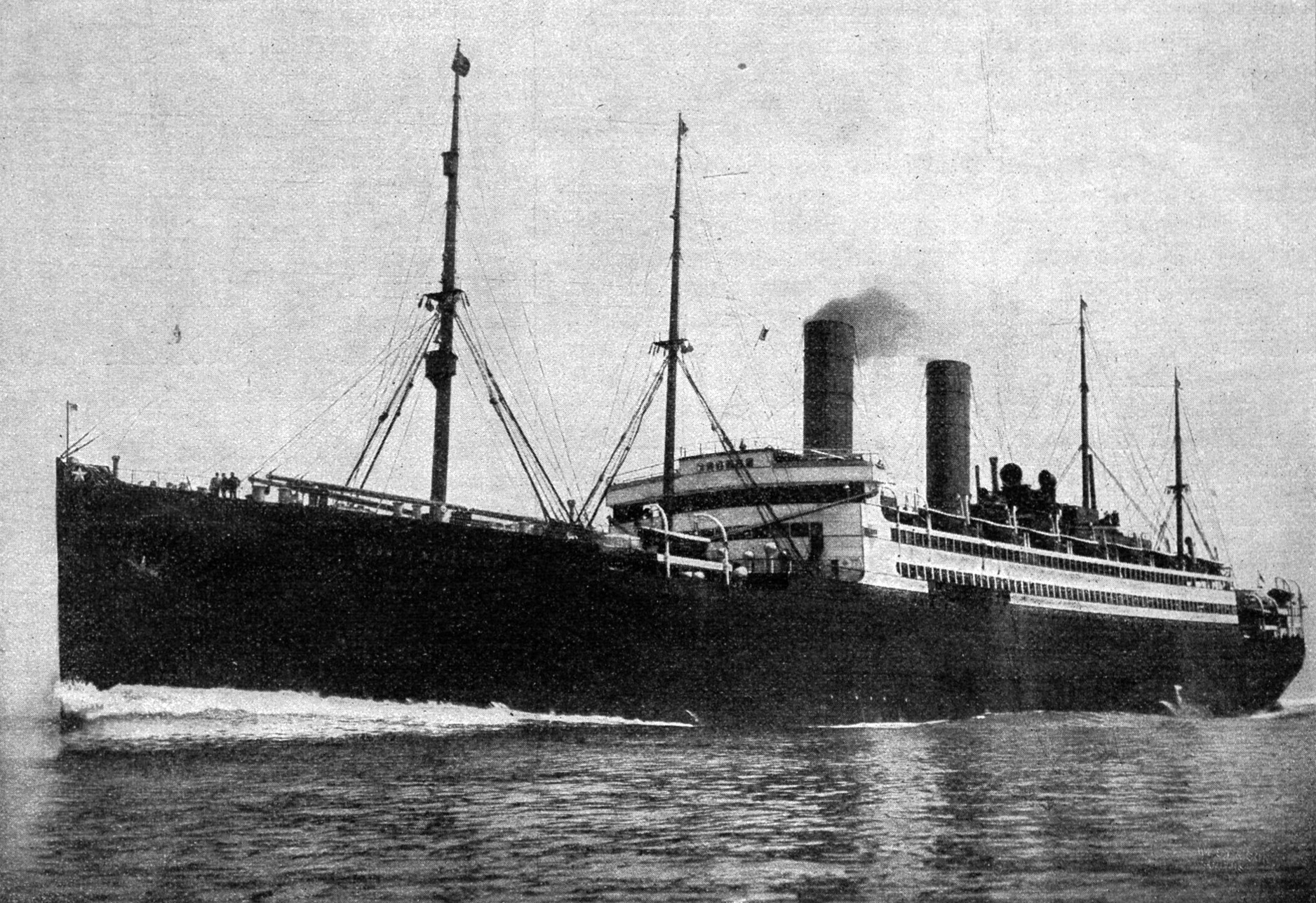
SS George Washington, the largest German-built steamship at the time

==== Ships named in honor of George Washington ====
- USS George Washington (disambiguation)
  - SS George Washington
  - USS George Washington (CVN-73)
- USS Washington (disambiguation) (not all are named in honor of George Washington)
  - USRC Washington (1833)

== Publications about George Washington ==
Bibliography of George Washington

- A Birthday Cake for George Washington
- George Washington: An Initial Biography
- His Excellency: George Washington
- Leader by Destiny: George Washington, Man and Patriot
- The Crossing: How George Washington Saved the American Revolution
- The Indian World of George Washington: The First President, the First Americans, and the Birth of the Nation
- "The Only Unavoidable Subject of Regret": George Washington, Slavery and the Enslaved Community at Mount Vernon
- Washington's Spies: The Story of America's First Spy Ring
- Washington: A Life
- You Never Forget Your First: A Biography of George Washington

== See also ==
- Republicanism
- Federalist Party
  - Federalist Era
- American Philosophical Society
- Mount Vernon Ladies' Association
- List of presidents of the United States
- List of American Revolutionary War battles
- British Army during the American War of Independence
- List of bibliographies on American history
