= 1790 State of the Union Address =

1790 State of the Union Address may refer to:

- January 1790 State of the Union Address, delivered by President George Washington to the United States Congress on January 8, 1790, at the Senate Chamber of Federal Hall in New York City
- December 1790 State of the Union Address, delivered by President George Washington to the 1st United States Congress on December 8, 1790, also at the Senate Chamber of Federal Hall in New York City
