= Mountain Road =

Mountain Road may refer to:

- A mountain trail
- A mountain pass
- The Mountain Road, a 1960 war film
- Mountain Road Lottery, a lottery by George Washington and others in 1767
- Mountain Road (Iceland), a type of road in Iceland

== Places ==
- Mountain Road, Virginia
- Kohala Mountain Road, Hawaii
- Pedro Mountain Road, San Mateo County, California
- South Mountain Road, New City, New York
- Spring Mountain Road, Las Vegas Valley, Nevada
