= 1795 State of the Union Address =

Speech by US President George Washington

- Date: December 8, 1795
- Venue: Hall of the House of Representatives, Congress Hall
- Location: Philadelphia, Pennsylvania
- Type: State of the Union Address
- Participants: George Washington; John Adams; Jonathan Dayton
- Previous: 1794 State of the Union Address
- Next: 1796 State of the Union Address

The 1795 State of the Union Address was delivered by the first president of the United States, George Washington, to a joint session of the 4th United States Congress on December 8, 1795. This address covered a broad range of topics, including foreign relations, military affairs, and the domestic state of the Union.

Washington began by celebrating the peace agreement made with the Native American tribes north of the Ohio River, known as the Treaty of Greenville, ending a long and costly war. He emphasized that the satisfaction of the tribes had been a key objective of the treaty to ensure lasting tranquility.

Additionally, Washington discussed ongoing peace negotiations with Algiers and the recognition of the United States' treaty by the Emperor of Morocco. He also noted the progress of negotiations with Spain and the recently signed Jay Treaty with Great Britain.

Washington praised the economic prosperity of the nation, highlighting the rapid growth of population, agriculture, commerce, and manufacturing, as well as the neutral stance maintained by the United States amid conflicts in Europe. He attributed the country's success to the stability provided by its Constitution and encouraged Congress to continue to nurture the nation's advantages.

The president also acknowledged the resolution of the Whiskey Rebellion and noted that the misled citizens had returned to lawfulness, allowing him to extend pardons to those involved. He emphasized the need for military and militia reform to ensure national security and the continued protection of frontier inhabitants from lawless attacks against Native Americans.

Preceded by 1794 State of the Union Address	State of the Union addresses 1795	Succeeded by 1796 State of the Union Address
