= 1796 State of the Union Address =

Speech by US president George Washington

- Date: December 7, 1796
- Venue: Hall of the House of Representatives, Congress Hall
- Location: Philadelphia, Pennsylvania
- Type: State of the Union Address
- Participants: George Washington; John Adams; Jonathan Dayton
- Previous: 1795 State of the Union Address
- Next: 1797 State of the Union Address

The 1796 State of the Union Address was given by George Washington, the first president of the United States, on Wednesday, December 7, 1796. It was given in Congress Hall, Philadelphia. He gave it directly to Congress. He began with:

In recurring to the internal situation of our country since I had last the pleasure to address you, I find ample reason for a renewed expression of that gratitude to the Ruler of the Universe which a continued series of prosperity has so often and so justly called forth.

He ended with,

God's providential care may still be extended to the United States, that the virtue and happiness of the people may be preserved, and that the Government which they have instituted for the protection of their liberties may be perpetual.

The President also noted negotiations with the Creek Nation regarding purchase of land, which had stalled at that time. The President also recommended the establishment of an official military academy noting that a nation should "never be without an adequate stock of military knowledge for emergencies".

Preceded by 1795 State of the Union Address	State of the Union addresses 1796	Succeeded by 1797 State of the Union Address
