= 1794 State of the Union Address =

Speech by US President George Washington

- Date: November 19, 1794
- Venue: Hall of the House of Representatives, Congress Hall
- Location: Philadelphia, Pennsylvania
- Type: State of the Union Address
- Participants: George Washington; John Adams; Frederick Muhlenberg
- Previous: 1793 State of the Union Address
- Next: 1795 State of the Union Address

The 1794 State of the Union Address was delivered by the first president of the United States, George Washington, to a joint session of the 3rd United States Congress on November 19, 1794. The speech came in the aftermath of the Whiskey Rebellion, an armed insurrection in the western counties of Pennsylvania against the federal excise tax on whiskey.

In his address, Washington expressed regret that "some of the citizens of the United States have been found capable of insurrection." He explained the necessity of enforcing the law through military action, emphasizing the importance of maintaining order and the rule of law, while lamenting the need to summon the militia to quell the rebellion.

Washington highlighted the failure of peaceful measures, noting that the government's attempts at moderation and reconciliation were misinterpreted as weakness. He described how, despite offering pardons and seeking negotiations, the insurrection continued, leading to the deployment of 15,000 militia troops.

The address also stressed the importance of upholding the Constitution, warning against the dangers posed by lawlessness and sedition. Washington praised the militia for their dedication and perseverance, remarking on the "patriotic cooperation" between the federal government and the states.

In addition to addressing the Whiskey Rebellion, Washington briefly touched upon other issues, including relations with Native American tribes and the nation's foreign policy, particularly the need to avoid entanglements in European conflicts.

Preceded by 1793 State of the Union Address	State of the Union addresses 1794	Succeeded by 1795 State of the Union Address
