= 1792 State of the Union Address =

Speech by US President George Washington

- Date: November 6, 1792
- Venue: Congress Hall
- Location: Philadelphia, Pennsylvania
- Type: State of the Union Address
- Participants: George Washington; John Adams; Jonathan Trumbull Jr.
- Previous: 1791 State of the Union Address
- Next: 1793 State of the Union Address

The 1792 State of the Union Address was delivered by George Washington to Congress on Tuesday, November 6, 1792. It was presented in Philadelphia's Congress Hall.

The president commented on continued incursions by Native Americans into frontier settlements. Notably, the address contains mention of the Chickamaugas, a part of the Cherokee tribe that committed multiple incursions in frontiers along the Tennessee River. The President noted that the incursions were a violation of the Treaty of Holston.

He said,

The results of your common deliberations hitherto will, I trust, be productive of solid and durable advantages to our constituents, such as, by conciliating more and more their ultimate suffrage, will tend to strengthen and confirm their attachment to that Constitution of Government upon which, under Divine Providence, materially depend their union, their safety, and their happiness.

Still further to promote and secure these inestimable ends there is nothing which can have a more powerful tendency than the careful cultivation of harmony, combined with a due regard to stability, in the public councils.

Preceded by 1791 State of the Union Address	State of the Union addresses 1792	Succeeded by 1793 State of the Union Address
