= 1793 State of the Union Address =

Speech by US President George Washington

- Date: December 3, 1793
- Venue: Senate Chamber, Congress Hall
- Location: Philadelphia, Pennsylvania
- Type: State of the Union Address
- Participants: George Washington; John Adams; Frederick Muhlenberg
- Previous: 1792 State of the Union Address
- Next: 1794 State of the Union Address

The 1793 State of the Union Address was given by George Washington, the first president of the United States. It was given in Philadelphia, Pennsylvania at Congress Hall. Washington stood before the 3rd United States Congress on Tuesday, December 3, 1793, and said, "While on the one hand it awakened my gratitude for all those instances of affectionate partiality with which I have been honored by my country, on the other it could not prevent an earnest wish for that retirement from which no private consideration should ever have torn me." He ended with, "Permit me to bring to your remembrance the magnitude of your task. Without an unprejudiced coolness the welfare of the Government may be hazarded; without harmony as far as consists with freedom of sentiment its dignity may be lost."

During the address, Washington spoke of Peace through strength. He also urged the expansion of the legal code and jurisdiction of the courts in order to enforce the laws of the land. The President reported on progress for peace with the Creek and Cherokee tribes and noted that trade with the tribes should be expanded where possible.

Preceded by 1792 State of the Union Address	State of the Union addresses 1793	Succeeded by 1794 State of the Union Address
