= National Thanksgiving Proclamation =

First formal proclamation of Thanksgiving in the United States

The National Thanksgiving Proclamation was the first presidential proclamation of Thanksgiving in the United States. At the request of Congress, President George Washington declared Thursday, November 26, 1789, as a day of public thanksgiving and prayer. A National Proclamation of Thanksgiving had been issued by the Second Continental Congress in November 1777.

== Background ==
Setting aside time to give thanks for one's blessings, along with holding feasts to celebrate a harvest, are both practices that long predate the European settlement of North America. The first documented thanksgiving services in territory currently belonging to the United States were conducted by Spaniards and the French in the 16th century. Thanksgiving services were routine in what became the Commonwealth of Virginia as early as 1607, with the first permanent settlement of Jamestown, Virginia holding a thanksgiving in 1610. In 1619, the Berkeley Hundred colony held a service on December 4, 1619, to celebrate "the day of our ship's arrival" and proclaimed the date would be "yearly and perpetually kept holy as a day of thanksgiving to the Almighty God." The colony was wiped out shortly after, in March 1622, with some inhabitants being massacred, and the rest fleeing.

The generally referenced 'First Thanksgiving' occurred on Plymouth Colony, shortly after the colonists first successful harvest in autumn of 1621. They celebrated for three straight days with their Native American neighbors with whom they had signed a mutual protection treaty the Spring before. The National Museum of the American Indian reported that the Mayflower "Pilgrims did not introduce the concept of thanksgiving" when they arrived. The New England tribes already had autumn harvest feasts of thanksgiving. To the original people of this continent, each day is a day of thanksgiving to the Creator." The Wampanoag tribe that met them when the Mayflower landed celebrated Cranberry Day every year as their thanksgiving.

In 1723, British Massachusetts Bay Governor William Dummer proclaimed a day of thanksgiving on November 6. The first proclamation on the way to becoming the United States was issued by John Hancock as President of the Continental Congress as a day of fasting on March 16, 1776. The first national Thanksgiving was celebrated on December 18, 1777, and the Continental Congress issued National Thanksgiving Day proclamations each year between 1778 and 1784.

During the American Revolutionary War, Thanksgiving services were conducted by Reverend Israel Evans for the troops at Valley Forge, under the command of General George Washington, and for the troops under John Sullivan during the Sullivan Expedition in the German Church of Easton, Pennsylvania.

== The First Presidential National Day of Thanksgiving ==
In Congress, Elias Boudinot introduced a resolution to create a joint committee to "wait on the President of the United States, to request that he would recommend to the people a day of public prayer and thanksgiving,"

The resolution was opposed by Anti-Federalists, who opposed increased power of the central government. Chief among the opposition were Aedanus Burke, and Thomas Tudor Tucker. Burke was of the opinion that the holiday was too "European." He "did not like this mimicking of European customs, where they made a mere mockery of thanksgivings." Burke was referencing the fact that at thanksgivings, both sides of a war often sang Te Deum, a hymn of praise. He was objecting that both the winners and losers in a war gave thanksgiving. Tucker however, felt that the federal government did not have the power to propose a day of thanksgiving. He was of the opinion that "If a day of thanksgiving must take place, let it be done by the authority of the States." Tucker also worried about the separation of church and state, as in his opinion, proclaiming a day of thanksgiving was a religious matter.

In the end, the resolution passed the House and the Senate, and a committee of Elias Boudinot, Roger Sherman, Peter Silvester, William Samuel Johnson, and Ralph Izard delivered the message to Washington on or before September 28, 1789. President Washington noted that "both Houses of Congress have by their joint Committee requested [him] 'to recommend to the People of the United States a day of public thanksgiving and prayer.'" It was formally declared on November 26 to "be devoted by the People of these States to the service of that great and glorious Being, who is the beneficent Author of all the good that was, that is, or that will be." President George Washington made this proclamation on October 3, 1789, in New York City.

On the day of thanksgiving, Washington attended services at St. Paul's Chapel in New York City, and donated beer and food to imprisoned debtors in the city.

=== Text ===
Whereas it is the duty of all Nations to acknowledge the providence of Almighty God, to obey His will, to be grateful for His benefits, and humbly to implore His protection and favor, and whereas both Houses of Congress have by their joint Committee requested me "to recommend to the People of the United States a day of public thanksgiving and prayer to be observed by acknowledging with grateful hearts the many signal favors of Almighty God especially by affording them an opportunity peaceably to establish a form of government for their safety and happiness. Now therefore I do recommend and assign Thursday the 26th day of November next to be devoted by the People of these States to the service of that great and glorious Being, who is the beneficent Author of all the good that was, that is, or that will be. That we may then all unite in rendering unto Him our sincere and humble thanks, for His kind care and protection of the People of this Country previous to their becoming a Nation, for the signal and manifold mercies, and the favorable interpositions of His providence, which we experienced in the course and conclusion of the late war, for the great degree of tranquility, union, and plenty, which we have since enjoyed, for the peaceable and rational manner, in which we have been enabled to establish constitutions of government for our safety and happiness, and particularly the national one now lately instituted, for the civil and religious liberty with which we are blessed; and the means we have of acquiring and diffusing useful knowledge; and in general for all the great and various favors which He hath been pleased to confer upon us. And also that we may then unite in most humbly offering our prayers and supplications to the great Lord and Ruler of Nations and beseech Him to pardon our national and other transgressions, to enable us all, whether in public or private stations, to perform our several and relative duties properly and punctually, to render our national government a blessing to all the people, by constantly being a Government of wise, just, and constitutional laws, discreetly and faithfully executed and obeyed, to protect and guide all Sovereigns and Nations (especially such as have shown kindness unto us) and to bless them with good government, peace, and concord. To promote the knowledge and practice of true religion and virtue, and the increase of science among them and Us, and generally to grant unto all Mankind such a degree of temporal prosperity as He alone knows to be best. Given under my hand at the City of New York the third day of October in the year of our Lord 1789.

— George Washington

"Thanksgiving Proclamation of 1789"
by George Washington
Read by Bill Mosley for LibriVox
Audio 00:04:59 (full text)

== Aftermath ==
George Washington proclaimed a second day of Thanksgiving in 1795, following the defeat of the Whiskey Rebellion. John Adams, James Madison also declared days of Thanksgiving. Several presidents opposed days of national thanksgiving, with Thomas Jefferson openly denouncing such a proclamation. That was seen as ironic because Jefferson had proclaimed a day of Thanksgiving while he was the governor of Virginia. By 1855, 16 states celebrated Thanksgiving (14 on the fourth Thursday of November, and two on the third). President Lincoln's first proclaimed days in April, October and November. However, it was not until 1863 that Abraham Lincoln established the regular tradition of observing days of national thanksgiving.
