= January 1790 State of the Union Address =

Speech by US President George Washington

- Date: January 8, 1790; 236 years ago
- Venue: Senate Chamber, Federal Hall
- Location: New York City, New York
- Type: State of the Union Address
- Participants: George Washington; John Adams; Frederick Muhlenberg
- Next: December 1790 State of the Union Address

The 1790 State of the Union Address was the inaugural State of the Union address, delivered by President George Washington to the United States Congress on January 8, 1790, at the Senate Chamber of Federal Hall in New York City.

In this first address, Washington set the example for what would be expected of presidents after him. Even at the time, issues such as his choice of clothing, who stood beside him, and the delivery of his message were discussed. It remains the shortest State of the Union Address, containing only 1,089 words.

== Speech ==
In his speech, Washington explained some of the challenges that America would face, and he addressed what he expected for the future.

Washington began his address by congratulating Congress for the accession of North Carolina and highlighting the country's progress: "Plenty, with which we are blessed, are circumstances auspicious in an eminent degree to our national prosperity." While Washington celebrated with the people, he also cautioned them about the work required to secure America's future. He emphasized, "To be prepared for war is one of the most effective means of preserving peace," and called upon his country to create a sufficient army and gather the necessary resources for its maintenance. In his speech, Washington addressed the formation of the army, as well as its funding, supplies, and structure, ensuring that the matter was promptly addressed.

Washington believed that foreign policy should be handled by the President, and he made a promise to fulfill his "duty in that respect in the manner which circumstances may render most public good." Additionally, he addressed the necessity of establishing a naturalization process for immigrants that would showcase their value to the new country. Moreover, Washington urged natural-born citizens to actively participate in the growth and progress of their nation.

Washington then transitioned from addressing official needs to focusing on citizens' everyday lives. The speech highlighted the significance of agriculture, commerce, manufacturing, science, and literature. He emphasized the importance of their knowledge, enabling people to "know and to value their own rights; to discern and provide against invasions of them, etc.". Lastly, he reminded the Senate and the House of Representatives of their duty to the country and stressed the necessity for cooperation to uphold a functioning republic.

== Congressional response ==
In response to the portion of Washington's speech calling for "the promotion of 'science and literature,'" Congress began drafting the Patent Act of 1790 and the Copyright Act of 1790. However, Washington's further suggestion that the United States establish a national university was questioned in the House of Representatives. Representative Michael Jenifer Stone was concerned that this would be unconstitutional because there was no authorization for Congress to find such a business, and a national university was never established.

First	State of the Union addresses January 1790	Succeeded by December 1790 State of the Union Address
