= December 1790 State of the Union Address =

Speech by US President George Washington

- Date: December 8, 1790
- Venue: Senate Chamber, Federal Hall
- Location: New York City, New York
- Type: State of the Union Address
- Participants: George Washington; John Adams; Frederick Muhlenberg
- Previous: January 1790 State of the Union Address
- Next: 1791 State of the Union Address

The 1790 State of the Union Address was delivered by President George Washington to the 1st United States Congress on December 8, 1790.

This address, longer than Washington's first State of the Union Address earlier in 1790, consisted of 1,401 words.

The address contained the President's thoughts on recent incursions by bands of Native Americans into frontier settlements in Ohio and his plan to deploy the militia to deal with the issue. Additionally, the President urged the prompt creation of an official militia, a mint, a standards organization to determine weights and measures, a postal service, and a body to oversee road building.

Preceded by January 1790 State of the Union Address	State of the Union addresses December 1790	Succeeded by 1791 State of the Union Address
