= Congress Hall =

Museum and former capitol building in Philadelphia, USA

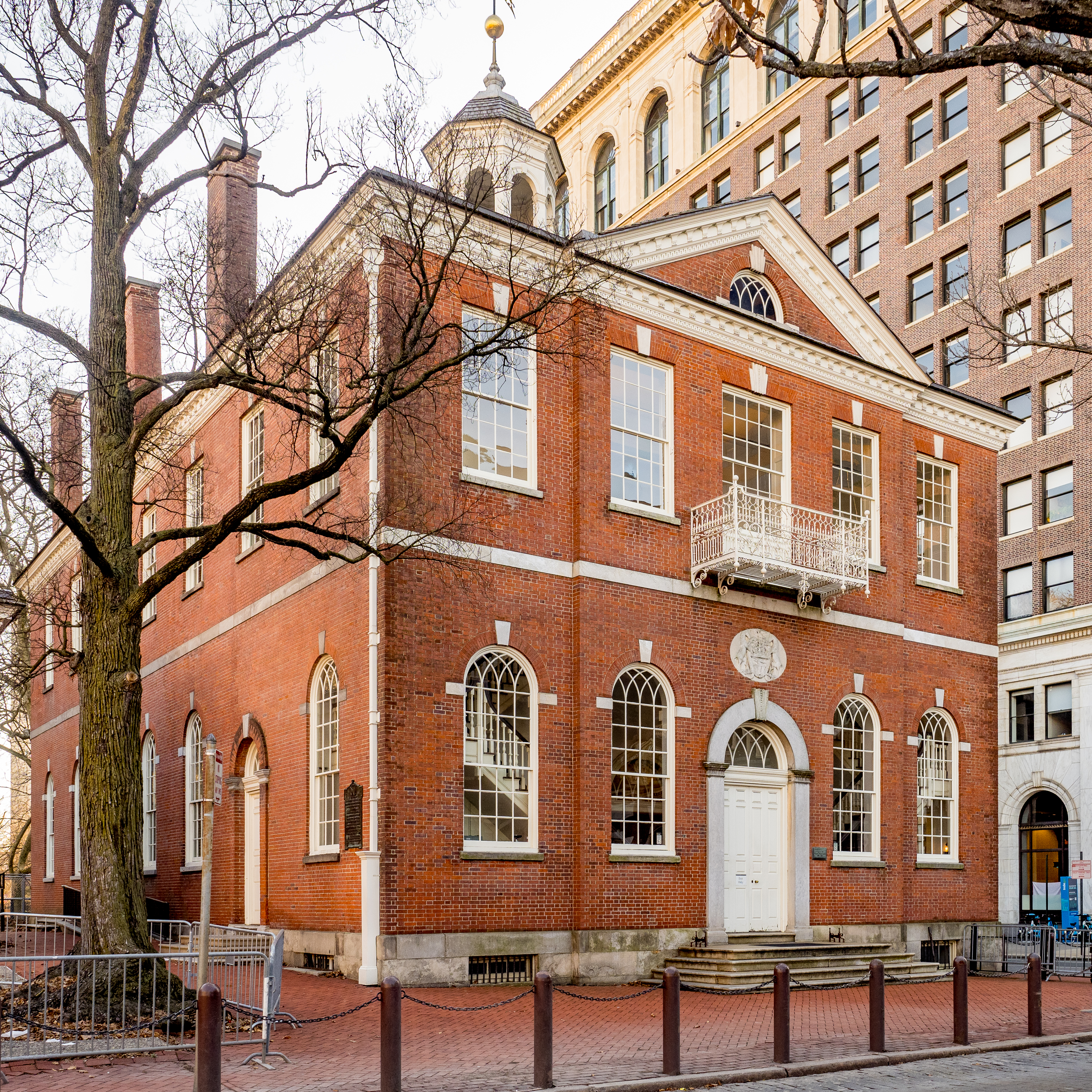
- (2024)

- Location within Philadelphia Congress Hall (Pennsylvania) Congress Hall (the United States)
- Former names: Philadelphia County Courthouse

General information
- Architectural style: Federal
- Location: Chestnut Street at 6th, Philadelphia, Pennsylvania, U.S.
- Coordinates: 39.9491°N 75.1507°W
- Current tenants: National Park Service
- Construction started: 1787
- Completed: 1789
- Owner: City of Philadelphia

Design and construction
- Architect: Samuel Lewis

Congress Hall, located in Philadelphia at the intersection of Chestnut and 6th Streets, served as the seat of the United States Congress from December 6, 1790, to May 14, 1800. During Congress Hall's duration as the capitol of the United States, the country admitted three new states, Vermont, Kentucky, and Tennessee; ratified the Bill of Rights of the United States Constitution; and oversaw the presidential inaugurations of both George Washington (his second) and John Adams.

Congress Hall was restored in the 20th century to its original appearance of 1796. The building is now managed by the National Park Service within the Independence National Historical Park and is open for public tours. Congress Hall is conjoined with Independence Hall, which is adjacent to the east.

== Background ==
Philadelphia served as the capital of the United States both during and immediately after the American Revolutionary War. Independence Hall, located next door, served as the meeting place of the Continental Congress until the Pennsylvania Mutiny in June 1783. The failure of the Pennsylvania government to protect Congress from a mob of angry mutineers caused the representatives to withdraw to Princeton, New Jersey. The national capital then moved to Annapolis, Maryland, in November 1783, then to Trenton, New Jersey, in November 1784 before finally moving to New York City in January 1785.

State delegates did not return to Independence Hall (then known as the Pennsylvania State House) in Philadelphia until the United States Constitutional Convention in 1787; however, New York City remained the official capital even during the convention. Designed by architect Samuel Lewis, Congress Hall was originally built to serve as the Philadelphia County Courthouse; construction began in 1787 and was completed two years later.

== Temporary capitol ==
Article One, Section Eight, of the United States Constitution granted Congress the authority to create a federal district to serve as the national capital. Following the ratification of the Constitution, the Congress, while meeting in New York, passed the Residence Act on July 9, 1790. The Act established the District of Columbia on the banks of the Potomac River between the states of Maryland and Virginia to serve as the new federal capital. However, Robert Morris, a Senator from Pennsylvania, convinced Congress to return to Philadelphia while the new permanent capital was being built. As a result, the Residence Act also declared Philadelphia to be the temporary capital for a period of ten years.

In an attempt to convince Congress to keep the capital in Philadelphia, the city began construction on a massive new presidential palace on 9th Street as well as an expansion to the county courthouse into what would become Congress Hall. Upon the return of Congress to Philadelphia on December 6, 1790, the first level of Congress Hall had been transformed into the chamber for the House of Representatives and the second floor had been converted into a chamber for the United States Senate. Despite their efforts to construct new buildings for use by the federal government, the city's residents failed to convince Congress to modify the Residence Act and make Philadelphia the permanent capital. Congress Hall served as the capitol building until May 14, 1800, when the offices of the national government moved to Washington, D.C.

== Interior ==
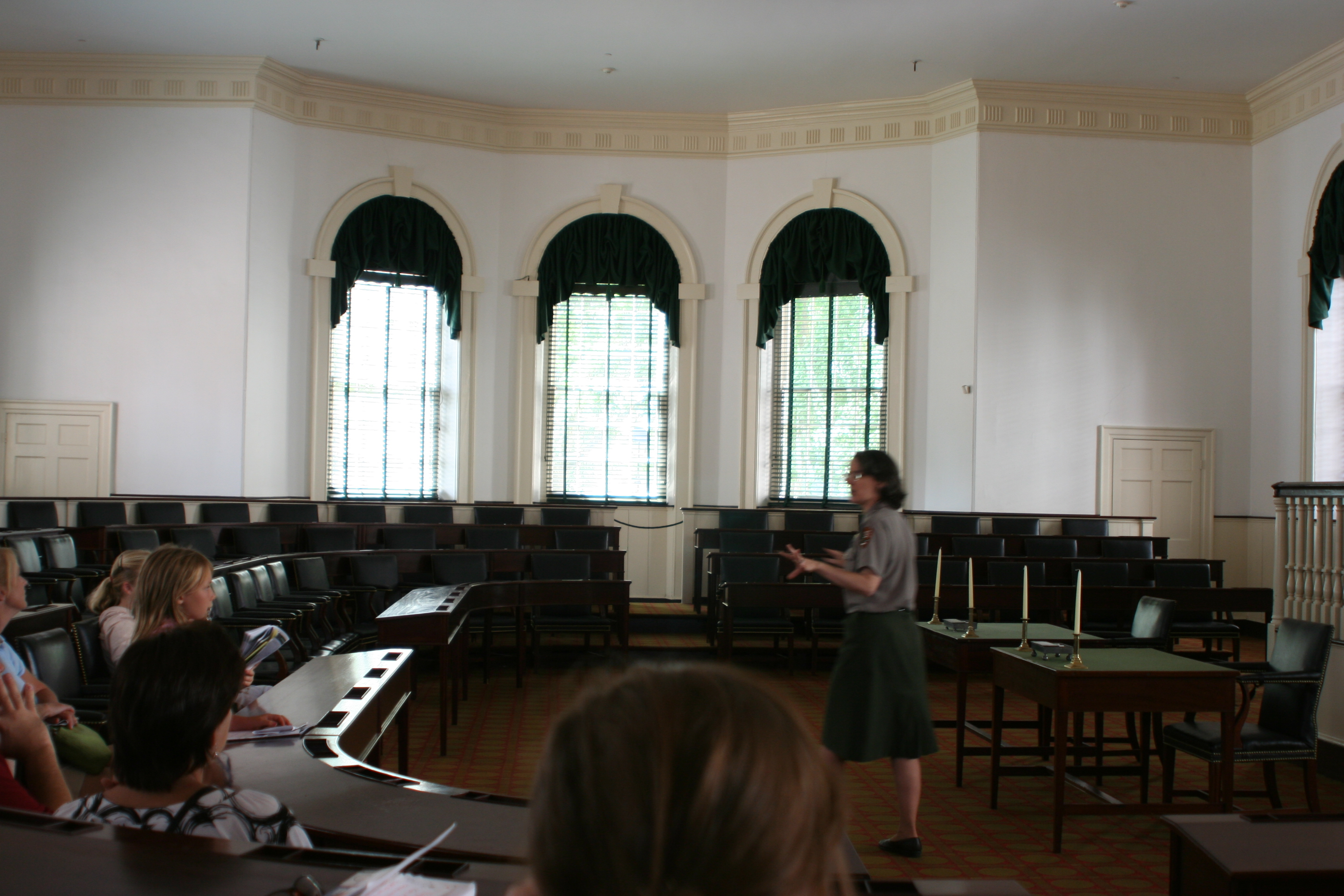
House chamber on the first floor of Congress Hall

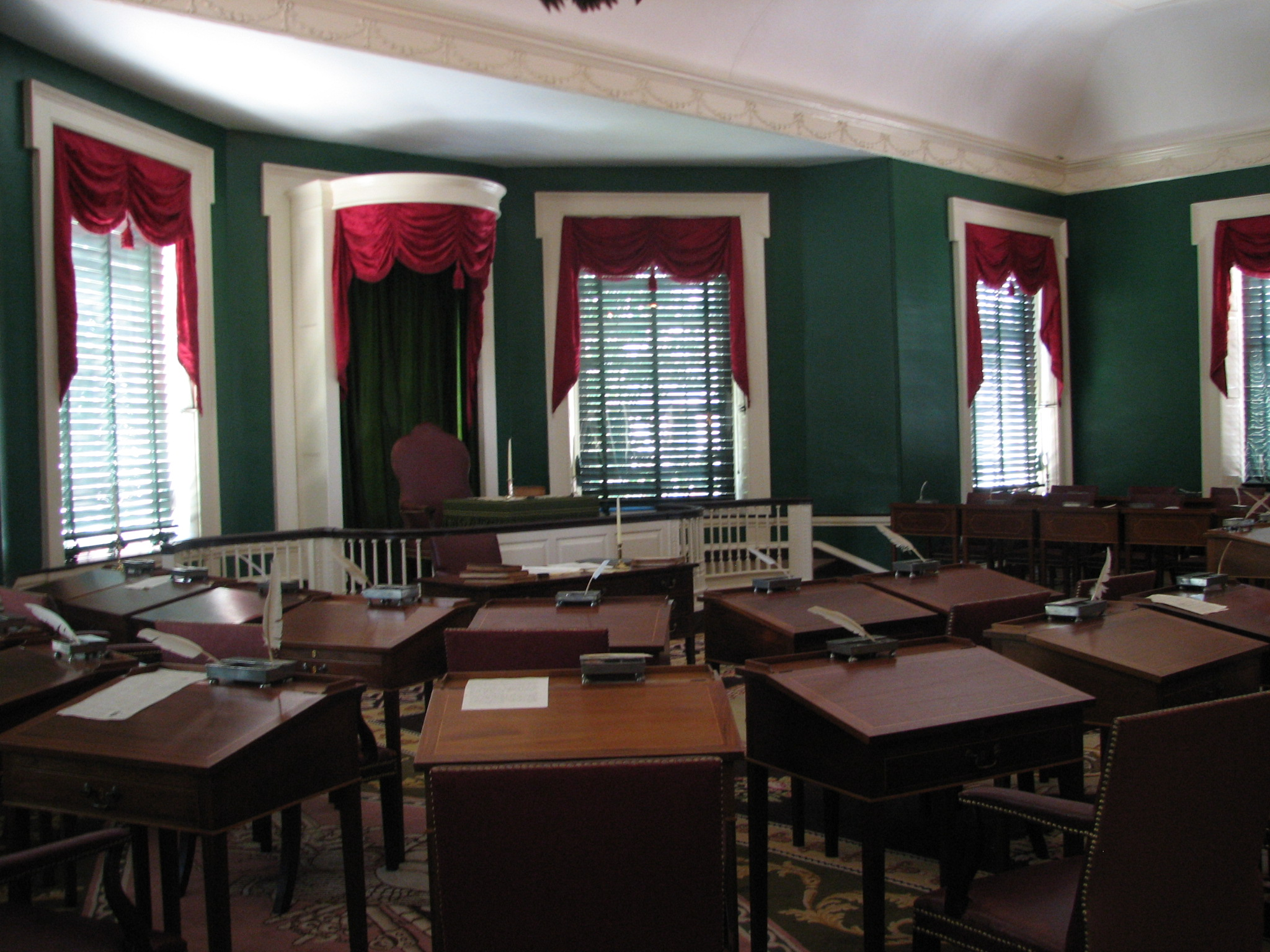
Senate chamber on the second floor of Congress Hall

The House chamber on the first floor is rather simple and featured mahogany desks and leather chairs. The room eventually accommodated 106 representatives from 16 states: the 13 original states as well as the representatives from the new states of Vermont in 1791, Kentucky in 1792, and Tennessee in 1796. The room has been restored to its original appearance in 1796.

The second floor, reserved as the chamber for the Senate, was more ornate and adorned with heavy red drapes. By 1796, the room featured 32 secretary desks very similar to the desks that are still used in the current Senate chamber in the United States Capitol; 28 of the desks at Congress Hall are original. Portraits of Louis XVI and Marie Antoinette, presented as gifts from the French monarch following the American Revolution, hang in adjoining committee rooms. A fresco of an American bald eagle is painted on the ceiling, holding the traditional olive branch to symbolize peace. Also on the ceiling, a plaster medallion in the form of a sunburst features 13 stars to represent the original colonies. The design mirrors a similar pattern on the floor, where a carpet made by William Sprague, a local weaver, features the shields of each of the 13 original states. The carpet seen today is a reproduction of the original.

== Legacy ==
During the almost ten years it served as the capitol, Congress Hall witnessed many historic events including the admittance of three new states and ratification of the United States Bill of Rights. The second inauguration of George Washington took place in the House chamber in 1793, as did the inauguration of John Adams in 1797. Congress also used the time to establish the First Bank of the United States, the Federal Mint, and the United States Department of the Navy. The Jay Treaty, which secured a temporary peace with Great Britain, was also ratified at Congress Hall in 1796.

After the capital moved to Washington, Congress Hall returned to its original function as the Philadelphia County Courthouse and served as the location of both state and federal courts during the early 19th century. Also designed by Samuel Lewis, the Burlington County Courthouse in Mount Holly Township, New Jersey was built in 1796 and modeled after Congress Hall.

== Restoration and present status ==
After its use as a courthouse in the early 19th century, Congress Hall, like other buildings in the area, had fallen into disrepair. In 1870, the Pennsylvania General Assembly ordered the demolition of all the buildings surrounding Independence Hall. The law was never enforced, however, and was officially repealed in 1895. Under the leadership of a civic organization known as The Colonial Dames of America, the architect George Champlin Mason Jr. began restoring Congress Hall in 1895-96, though this work was mostly limited to the Senate chamber. In 1900, the Philadelphia chapter of the American Institute of Architects (AIA) began a study of Congress Hall and initiated a funding drive for the building's complete restoration. After funds were secured, the City of Philadelphia approved the restoration project in 1912 under the supervision of the AIA. Work on Congress Hall was completed the following year when President Woodrow Wilson rededicated the building. Additional work to refurbish the House chamber was completed in 1934. In 1942, over 50 civic and patriotic groups met at the American Philosophical Society and joined to create the Independence Hall Association. The association lobbied for the creation of Independence National Historical Park, which was initially approved by Congress in 1948 and formally established on July 4, 1956.

Congress Hall is now maintained by the National Park Service, which operates guided tours of the building throughout the year on a first-come, first-served basis.

On December 2, 2008, the building hosted President-elect Barack Obama's meeting with the National Governors Association where they discussed the 2008 financial crisis.

== See also ==
- List of state and county courthouses in Pennsylvania
