= Timeline of the George Washington presidency =

The presidency of George Washington began on April 30, 1789, when George Washington was inaugurated as the first president of the United States, and ended on March 4, 1797.

== 1789 ==
=== April 1789 ===
- April 30 – George Washington is inaugurated as the first president of the United States. John Adams becomes vice president.

=== May 1789 ===
- May 11 – Washington visits the John Street Theatre for the first time when he attends a performance of The School for Scandal. He becomes a regular patron and frequently brings important figures as guests in the president's box.
- May 16 – Washington's wife Martha departs from the Washington residence at Mount Vernon to the capital in New York.
- May 27 – Washington receives his wife at Elizabethtown, New York.

=== June 1789 ===
- June 1 – The first bill passed under the Constitution, An Act to regulate the Time and Manner of administering certain Oaths, is passed and signed by George Washington.
- June 17 – Samuel Bard operates on Washington to remove a tumor from his thigh. His father, John Bard, supervises.

=== July 1789 ===
- July 4 – Congress passes the Tariff of 1789, its first protective tariff.
- July 27 – The Department of Foreign Affairs (later renamed the Department of State) is established as the first agency of the federal government of the United States.
- July 29 – The Senate ratifies a convention regarding the consuls of France and the United States from the previous November.

=== August 1789 ===
- August 5 – Washington makes a surprise appearance at the Senate after it rejects his nomination of Benjamin Fishbourn as collector of the Port of Savannah.
- August 7
  - The Department of War is established.
  - The Lighthouse Act is passed.
- August 21 – A proposal for a Bill of Rights is adopted by the House of Representatives.
- August 22 – Washington delivers a proposed treaty with the Creek people to the Senate. He goes in person for advice and consent, as described in the Constitution. He is insulted when Senator William Maclay refers him to a committee. This leads Washington to create the presidential Cabinet so he can have his own advisors. He decides to communicate treaties in writing going forward.
- August 25 – Washington's mother Mary Ball Washington dies.

=== September 1789 ===
- September 1 – Washington receives news of his mother's death.
- September 2 – The Department of the Treasury is founded.
- September 11 – Alexander Hamilton becomes the first Secretary of the Treasury.
- September 12 – Henry Knox becomes the first United States Secretary of War.
- September 15
  - The Department of Foreign Affairs is renamed the Department of State.
  - A law is passed to "provide for the safe keeping of the Acts, Records and Seal of the United States".
- September 22 – The position of postmaster general is established.
- September 24
  - The Judiciary Act of 1789 creates the federal courts and establishes that the Supreme Court has six justices.
  - Washington nominates John Jay as Chief Justice of the United States. He nominates John Blair Jr., William Cushing, John Rutledge, and James Wilson as justices of the Supreme Court. He also nominates Robert H. Harrison, but Harrison declines.
  - Washington nominates Gunning Bedford Jr., Francis Hopkinson, Harry Innes, Richard Law, John Lowell, Nathaniel Pendleton, David Sewall, and John Sullivan to the United States District Courts for the Districts of Delaware, Pennsylvania, Kentucky, Connecticut, Massachusetts, Georgia, Maine, and New Hampshire, respectively. He also nominates Thomas Johnson, Edmund Pendleton, and Thomas Pinckney to the District Courts for the Districts of Maryland, Virginia, South Carolina, respectively, but they decline.
- September 25
  - Washington nominates David Brearley and James Duane to the United States District Courts for the Districts of New Jersey and New York, respectively.
  - Congress proposes a set of 12 amendments to the Constitution, for ratification by the states. Ten of them will be ratified and become the Bill of Rights. Another will be adopted as the Twenty-seventh Amendment in 1992.
- September 26
  - Thomas Jefferson becomes the first secretary of state, Edmund Randolph becomes the first attorney general, and Samuel Osgood becomes the first postmaster general.
  - Jefferson ends his tenure as Minister Plenipotentiary to France.
- September 29 – The 1st United States Congress adjourns from its first session.

=== October 1789 ===
- October – Washington goes on a tour of New England to foster a sense of national unity. He travels with a small group to give a modest impression. His stops include New Haven, Connecticut; Boston, Massachusetts; Salem, Massachusetts; Portsmouth, New Hampshire; and Lexington, Massachusetts. He is afflicted with a cold and an eye inflammation during his trip.
- October 3 – Washington issues the National Thanksgiving Proclamation, ordering a Thanksgiving day.

=== November 1789 ===
- November 13 – Washington returns to New York following his tour of New England.
- November 18 – Washington selects William Drayton as a recess appointment to the District Court for the District of South Carolina.
- November 21 – North Carolina joins the Union as the 12th State.
- November 26 – The first Thanksgiving is held.
- November 28 – Washington selects Cyrus Griffin as a recess appointment to the District Court for the District of Virginia.

=== December 1789 ===
- December 22 – Washington selects William Paca as a recess appointment to the District Court for the District of Maryland.

== 1790 ==
=== January 1790 ===
- January 4 – The 1st United States Congress convenes for its second session.
- January 8 – Washington delivers the first State of the Union Address.
- January 14 – Hamilton submits the First Report on the Public Credit to Congress.
- January 17 – Washington is incapacitated by severe toothache.

=== February 1790 ===
- February 1 – The Supreme Court convenes for the first time. It meets at the Merchants Exchange in New York City for a ten-day session.
- February 8
  - Washington nominates James Iredell to the Supreme Court.
  - Washington nominates his recess appointments William Drayton, Cyrus Griffin, and William Paca to continue serving in their respective seats.
- February 11 – Representative James Madison breaks with Washington and Hamilton by criticizing Hamilton's economic policy as too favorable for speculators. He proposes a discriminatory policy that would benefit original debt holders, primarily veterans.
- February 22 – The House rejects Madison's proposal of a discriminatory economic policy.
- February 23 – Washington moves into a larger presidential residence.
- February 25 – North Carolina cedes its western territories (modern day Tennessee) to the federal government.

=== March 1790 ===
- March 1 – The first United States Census is authorized.
- March 26 – Congress passes the Naturalization Act of 1790, its first naturalization law. It permits white people to become citizens after two years of residence.

=== April 1790 ===
- April 10 – The Patent Act of 1790 passes, establishing the United States patent system.
- April 20
  - Following a period of illness, Washington takes a five day tour of Long Island to recover.
  - William Carmichael becomes the first US Chargé d'Affaires to Spain.
- April 30 – A law is passed establishing federal crimes such as murder and treason, applicable under the jurisdiction of federal land or the sea.

=== May 1790 ===
- May – Shortly after recovering from his previous illness, Washington is severely affected by the flu epidemic. His hearing is mostly lost. Physicians Samuel Bard, John McKnight, and John Charlton are summoned, and there are fears Washington will not survive. William Jackson informally oversees the presidential office while the president is incapacitated, and Hamilton leads the administration's policy.
- May 12 – John Jones, the personal physician of Benjamin Franklin, is sneaked into New York to tend to Washington.
- May 16 – Washington begins recovering from his flu.
- May 18 – News breaks of Washington's flu and subsequent recovery.
- May 26 – Congress passes an act to govern the creation of states from the "Southwest Territory", from which Tennessee, Alabama, and Mississippi will be formed.
- May 27 – Washington resumes his duties after recovering from his flu.
- May 29 – Rhode Island ratifies the Constitution and becomes the thirteenth state.
- May 31 – The Copyright Act of 1790, the first copyright law of the United States, is signed into law.

=== June 1790 ===
- June 6 – Washington goes on a fishing trip with Jefferson and Hamilton to improve his health.
- June 7 – Washington nominates William Richardson Davie to the District Court for the District of North Carolina, but Davie declines.
- June 11 – Washington nominates Thomas Bee to the District Court for the District of South Carolina.
- June 14 – William Short becomes Minister Plenipotentiary to France.
- June 20 – Compromise of 1790: Jefferson, Madison, and Hamilton come to an agreement: Madison agrees to not be "strenuous" in opposition for the assumption of state debts by the federal government; Hamilton agrees to support the capital site being above the Potomac.

=== July 1790 ===
- July 2 – Washington nominates Henry Marchant to the District Court for the District of Rhode Island.
- July 10
  - The House of Representatives votes, 32–29 to approve creating the District of Columbia from portions of Maryland and Virginia for the eventual seat of government and national capital.
  - Washington visits Fort Washington in Manhattan with his cabinet. Also present is Adams's son John Quincy Adams.
- July 16 – The national capital is legally changed from New York City to present-day Washington, D.C. The Residence Act authorizes Washington to order surveys and acquisitions of the land and sets a deadline of December 1800.
- July 20 – Alexander McGillivary, a leader of the Creek people, arrives in New York to negotiate the Treaty of New York.
- July 22 – The Nonintercourse Act sets requirements for a license to trade with Indian tribes.

=== August 1790 ===
- August – Washington sends Josiah Harmar on a campaign in the Northwest Indian War.
- August 2 – Washington nominates John Stokes to the District Court for the District of North Carolina.
- August 4
  - The Funding Act of 1790 is passed. The federal government assumes all debts incurred by the states during the American Revolutionary War.
  - A newly passed U.S. tariff act creates the system of cutters for revenue enforcement (later named the United States Revenue Cutter Service), the forerunner of the Coast Guard.
- August 7 – The United States signs the Treaty of New York with the Creek people.
- August 12 – The 1st United States Congress adjourns from its second session. Washington travels to Rhode Island over the following days. The government begins moving from New York to Philadelphia, as Philadelphia will become the new temporary capital in December.
- August 14 – Washington issues a proclamation declaring a treaty of Peace and Friendship with the Creek Nations.
- August 22 – Washington briefly returns to New York.
- August 26 – Washington issues a proclamation warning against violation of treaties with the Cherokee, Choctaw, and Chickasaw peoples.
- August 28 – Washington selects Robert Morris as a recess appointment to the District Court for the District of New Jersey.
- August 30 – Washington departs from New York to Philadelphia.

=== September 1790 ===
- September 6 – Washington departs from Philadelphia to Mount Vernon.
- September 12 – Washington arrives at Mount Vernon.
- September 30 – Hamilton sends Washington a message, influenced by British officer George Beckwith, encouraging him to recall Gouverneur Morris from London.

=== October 1790 ===
- October 15 – Washington departs from Mount Vernon to visit sites for the national capital.
- October 20 – The Harmar Campaign ends in a defeat of U.S. Army General Josiah Harmar and Colonel John Hardin by the Western Confederacy of Indians, led by Chief Mihšihkinaahkwa of the Miami tribe and Weyapiersenwah of the Shawnee at Kekionga (now Fort Wayne, Indiana).
- October 26 – Washington boards a ship to return to Mount Vernon.

=== November 1790 ===
- November – Madison publishes the first of 18 essays in the National Gazette where he criticizes the Washington administration.
- November 2 – Washington asks Henry Knox to write a justification for the Harmar campaign to deliver to Congress.
- November 27 – Washington arrives in Philadelphia as it becomes the new capital.

=== December 1790 ===
- December 6
  - The federal capital is moved from New York City to Philadelphia pending the construction of Washington, D.C.
  - The 1st United States Congress convenes for its third session.
- December 7 – Washington meets with Ignatius Palyrat, consul general from Portugal. This is the first diplomat to be welcomed to the President's House in Philadelphia.
- December 8 – Washington delivers the second State of the Union Address.
- December 13 – News reaches Philadelphia that Josiah Harmar's forces had been defeated twice by the forces of Shawnee leader Little Turtle.
- December 14 – Hamilton writes a report urging the creation of a Bank of the United States in the style of the Bank of England. He also proposes raising taxes on domestic spirits to pay the government debt.
- December 17 – Washington nominates John Sitgreaves to the District Court for the District of North Carolina and nominates his recess appointment Robert Morris to continue serving in his seat.
- December 21 – The Beverly Cotton Manufactory is completed in Pawtucket, Rhode Island. This is the first cotton mill in the United States and its creation starts the country's industrialization process.

== 1791 ==
=== January 1791 ===
- January 2 – Big Bottom massacre in the Ohio Country.
- January 24 – Washington issues a proclamation defining the boundaries of what will become the District of Columbia.

=== February 1791 ===
- February 4 – Kentucky is authorized to become a state, effective July 1.
- February 8 – The House approves the creation of the Bank of the United States. This is seen as a demonstration that Hamilton has more control over Congress than Madison or Jefferson.
- February 14 – Washington publicly announces that his representative to Britain had been treated in an insulting manner by the British.
- February 18 – Vermont is authorized to become a state, effective March 4.
- February 22 – Thomas Paine publishes the first edition of Rights of Man in London. He expresses support for the French Revolution and dedicates his writing to Washington. This original publication date coincides with Washington's birthday.
- February 25 – Washington signs the bank bill against the wishes of Madison, Jefferson, and Randolph. It sets a precedent that the president can exercise constitutional powers beyond a literal reading of the Constitution. The bill authorizes the creation of the First Bank of the United States.
- February 28 – Jefferson offers journalist Philip Freneau a job as a State Department clerk.

=== March 1791 ===
- March 3
  - Congress passes the Tariff of 1791, its first internal revenue law, to tax liquor.
  - The 1st United States Congress adjourns from its third session.
- March 4
  - Vermont becomes the fourteenth state of the United States.
  - Washington nominates Nathaniel Chipman to the District Court for the District of Vermont.
- March 15 – Washington issues an executive order to create tax collection districts.
- March 19 – Washington issues a proclamation condemning James O'Fallon for building forces in a way that "disturbs the public peace".
- March 21 – Washington departs from Philadelphia on a southern tour through Maryland, Virginia, North Carolina, South Carolina, and Georgia.
- March 24 – Washington's boat runs aground at Greenbury Point in the Severn River as he is crossing the Chesapeake Bay. He and his chariot driver are stranded in a storm for a day.
- March 25 – Washington arrives in Annapolis, Maryland where he visits St. John's College.
- March 27 – Washington departs from Annapolis.
- March 28 – Washington arrives in Georgetown and works with commissioners on plans for the District of Columbia, which will be built nearby as the federal capital. He approves the plan of the project's architect, Pierre Charles L'Enfant, except for the large number of diagonal streets L'Enfant proposed. He also negotiates a land dispute between Georgetown and Carrollsburgh.
- March 29 – Washington surveys the land that will become the District of Columbia. He holds a town hall with landowners of the area.
- March 30 – Washington issues a proclamation ordering a survey of the lands that will later be the District of Columbia. He then departs from Georgetown for his home at Mount Vernon.

=== April 1791 ===
- April 7 – Washington departs from Mount Vernon and resumes his tour of the southern states. He meets with his niece Mildred Washington Lee in Dumfries, Virginia.
- April 8 – Washington leaves Dumfries and travels to Fredericksburg, Virginia, where he meets with his sister Elizabeth Washington Lewis.
- April 10 – Washington departs from Fredericksburg.
- April 11 – Washington arrives in Richmond, Virginia, where he stays with Edward Carrington. Here he will visit the James River and review its canal system.
- April 14 – Washington travels to Petersburg, Virginia, accompanied for the entire trip by a procession from Richmond.
- April 15 – Washington departs from Petersburg. Wishing to avoid another grand procession, he leaves with his entourage at 5 o' clock despite saying he intended to leave at 8 o' clock.
- April 16 – Comptroller of the Treasury Nicholas Everleigh dies. This triggers a dispute between Jefferson and Hamilton, who want the position to be taken by Tench Coxe and Oliver Wolcott, respectively. Washington will choose Wolcott.
- April 17 – Washington arrives in Halifax, North Carolina. Unable to find a place to stay, Washington and his accompanying men had traveled 48 miles in a heavy storm.
- April 18 – Washington departs from Halifax.
- April 20 – Washington arrives in New Bern, North Carolina.
- April 22 – Washington departs from New Bern.
- April 24 – Washington arrives in Wilmington, North Carolina.
- April 26 – Washington departs from Wilmington.
- April 30 – Washington arrives in Georgetown, South Carolina.

=== May 1791 ===
- May 2 – Washington arrives in Charleston, South Carolina. In 1792, John Trumbull will paint this visit in Washington at the City of Charleston.
- May 9 – Washington departs from Charleston.
- May 12 – Washington arrives in Savannah, Georgia.
- May 13 – David Humphreys becomes the first US Minister Resident to Portugal.
- May 15 – Washington departs from Savannah.
- May 18 – Washington arrives in Augusta, then the capital of Georgia.
- May 21 – Washington departs from Augusta and begins his return trip northward.
- May 22 – Washington arrives in Columbia, South Carolina. This is the last major stop of the tour.
- May 25 – Washington travels from Columbia to Camden, South Carolina.
- May 26 – Washington departs from Camden.
- May 27 – Washington meets with the Catawba people to hear their complaints of encroachment on their land.
- May 28 – Washington arrives in Charlotte, North Carolina.
- May 29 – Washington departs from Charlotte.
- May 30 – Washington arrives in Salisbury, North Carolina.
- May 31 – Washington travels from Salisbury to Salem, North Carolina. He stays in Salem for an extra day so Governor Alexander Martin can join him.

=== June 1791 ===
- June – Washington's tumor returns on his thigh.
- June 2 – Washington joins Governor Alexander Martin to visit the site where the Battle of Guilford Court House took place. He departs with Martin joining his entourage for the day.
- June 12 – Washington returns home to Mount Vernon.
- June 27 – Washington departs from Mount Vernon to Georgetown to finish planning the District of Columbia. He leaves his nephew George Augustine Washington and his overseer Anthony Whiting in charge of repairing the estate.
- June 30 – Washington travels from Georgetown to Frederick, Maryland.

=== July 1791 ===
- July 1 – Washington travels from Frederick to Taneytown, Maryland.
- July 2
  - Washington travels from Taneytown to York, Pennsylvania.
  - The United States signs the Treaty of Holston with the Cherokee.
- July 3 – Washington attends a service at a Dutch Reformed Church in York, despite not speaking its language of Pennsylvania Dutch. He then travels to Lancaster, Pennsylvania.
- July 4
  - The Treasury begins selling shares of the Bank of the United States. The initial 4,000 shares sell out in the first hour.
  - Washington stays in Lancaster to join Independence Day celebrations in honor of the nation's fifteenth anniversary.
- July 6 – Washington returns to Philadelphia, concluding his three-month tour of the southern states.
- July 14 – Washington selects William Lewis as a recess appointment to the District Court for the District of Pennsylvania.

=== August 1791 ===
- August – The largest slave revolt in history takes place in Haiti. Fear spreads among slaveowners when news reaches the United States.
- August 5 – Washington selects Thomas Johnson as a recess appointment to the Supreme Court.
- August 10 – French diplomat and American Revolutionary War veteran Jean-Baptiste de Ternant arrives in New York and meets informally with Washington.
- August 12
  - The value of scrips—certificates that allow the purchase of Bank shares in installments—falls significantly. They had been subject to rampant speculation and formed an economic bubble.
  - Timothy Pickering succeeds Samuel Osgood as postmaster general.
  - Washington has a formal meeting with Jean Baptiste de Ternant.

=== September 1791 ===
- September 9 – The future capital is named Washington, D.C. in honor of George Washington.
- September 20 – Washington arrives at Mount Vernon. While here, he will approve the donation of arms to France to assist in fighting against the Haitian revolution.

=== October 1791 ===
- October 14 – Washington learns from his personal secretary Tobias Lear that Congress will be convening a week earlier than he had thought. He rushes to prepare.
- October 17 – Individual lots of the planned capital are put up for auction. Fearing that buyers will disregard less desirable lots, L'Enfant refuses to show the city plans. Only 30 are sold as a result.
- October 24 – The 2nd United States Congress convenes for its first session.
- October 25 – Washington delivers the 1791 State of the Union Address.
- October 31 – Washington nominates his recess appointments Thomas Johnson and William Lewis to continue serving in their respective seats.

=== November 1791 ===
- November 4 – The Miami people in the Northwest Territory repel an attack by General Arthur St. Clair in what came to be known as St. Clair's defeat. Approximately 900 of St. Clair's 1,400 men are injured or killed. American general Richard Butler is among the dead.
- November 11 – Washington meets with British diplomat George Hammond.

=== December 1791 ===
- December 5 – Hamilton delivers his Report on Manufactures. He calls for expansion of manufacturing to reduce dependence on foreign goods. If accepted, his proposals would result in greater federal involvement in the economy.
- December 9 – Washington receives news of St. Clair's defeat.
- December 12 – Washington informs Congress of St. Clair's defeat.
- December 15 – The first ten amendments to the Constitution, collectively called the Bill of Rights, are ratified.

== 1792 ==
=== January 1792 ===
- January 12
  - Thomas Pinckney becomes Minister Plenipotentiary to Great Britain.
  - Washington nominates Richard Peters to the District Court for the District of Pennsylvania.
- January 17 – L'Enfant submits his plan for the District of Columbia to Washington. His proposal would cost $1.2 million, which would require a foreign loan. The plan causes Washington's disdain for L'Enfant to grow.

=== February 1792 ===
- February 16 – Washington meets with Jefferson and Madison to discuss L'Enfant's plan for the District of Columbia.
- February 20 – The Postal Service Act is passed, setting postage rates and detailing the powers of the postmaster general.
- February 21
  - Jefferson speaks to L'Enfant on Washington's behalf, reminding him that the commissioners have authority over L'Efant's work designing the national capital.
  - Philadelphia celebrates Washington's sixtieth birthday, which will take place the following day.
- February 27 – L'Enfant is removed from his position as the primary architect for the federal district, as Washington deemed L'Enfant too controlling of the project. The L'Enfant Plan remains a major influence on the final design of Washington, D.C.

=== March 1792 ===
- March 1 – The Presidential Succession Act is passed, establishing procedures for the presidential line of succession.
- March 16 – Washington meets with abolitionist Warner Mifflin to hear an argument against slavery but remains neutral on the issue.

=== April 1792 ===
- April 2 – The Coinage Act of 1792 is passed, establishing the United States Mint and setting types of coinage.
- April 5 – Washington vetoes a bill designed to apportion representatives among U.S. states, saying it is unconstitutional. He argues that it favors the northern states over the southern states. This is the first use of the presidential veto in the United States.
- April 6 – Washington's veto of April 5 is sustained in the House.
- April 14 – The Apportionment Act of 1792 is passed to increase the number of seats in the House of Representatives.
- April 23 – The United States signs the Five Nations Agreement.

=== May 1792 ===
- May 2 – The first Militia Act is passed, granting the president authorization to raise a militia in response to invasion or insurrection.
- May 8
  - The second Militia Act is passed, granting state militias the power of conscription.
  - The 2nd United States Congress adjourns from its first session.
- May 15 – William Short ends his tenure as Minister Plenipotentiary to France.
- May 23 – Jefferson asks Washington seek a second term as president, arguing that Alexander Hamilton is attempting to turn the United States into a monarchy.

=== June 1792 ===
- June 1 – Kentucky becomes the fifteenth state of the United States.
- June 3 – Gouverneur Morris becomes Minister Plenipotentiary to France.
- June 18 – William Short becomes Minister Resident to the Netherlands.

=== July 1792 ===
- July 4 – Newspaper editor Philip Freneau publishes an article accusing Hamilton of turning the United States into a monarchy. Washington is affronted by the implication that he is being manipulated by Hamilton.
- July 10 – Jefferson meets with Washington to argue that monarchists are attempting to take over the United States.
- July 25 – Hamilton anonymously publishes a criticism of Jefferson in Gazette of the United States.

=== August 1792 ===
- August 18 – Hamilton sends a 14,000-word letter to Washington trying to justify his performance and policies in response to the criticism from Jefferson and his allies.

=== September 1792 ===
- September 15 – Washington issues a proclamation ordering violent protests against taxes on whiskey to disperse.
- September 21 – The French monarchy is abolished.

=== October 1792 ===
- October 13 – The cornerstone is laid for what will later be called the White House.

=== November 1792 ===
- November 5 – The 2nd United States Congress convenes for its second session.
- November 6
  - The second United States presidential election is held. Incumbent President George Washington receives all 132 electoral votes for president, and incumbent Vice President John Adams is re-elected with 77 of 132 votes. George Clinton receives 50.
  - Washington delivers the 1792 State of the Union Address.
- November 19 – France issues the Edict of Fraternity, declaring its support for global revolution against aristocracy. In the United States, this is seen as an endorsement of American-style republicanism.

=== December 1792 ===
- December 12 – Washington issues a proclamation offering a reward for the capture of those who burned a Cherokee town.
- December 19 – William Short ends his tenure as Minister Resident to the Netherlands.

== 1793 ==
=== January 1793 ===
- January 9 – Jean-Pierre Blanchard demonstrates his gas balloon flight in Philadelphia, with Washington in attendance.
- January 21 – King Louis XVI of France is executed in Paris during the French Revolution.
- January 27 – Washington writes a letter to his nephew, George Augustine Washington, who is on his deathbed.

=== February 1793 ===
- February 1 – France declares war on the Dutch Republic and the Kingdom of Great Britain in the War of the First Coalition.
- February 5 – Washington's nephew George Augustine Washington dies. Washington is the executor of his estate.
- February 12 – The Fugitive Slave Act of 1793 is passed, mandating that state governments capture and return escaped slaves from other states.
- February 21 – The Patent Act of 1793 expands the administration and requirements for the approval of patents.
- February 25 – Washington holds the first Cabinet meeting as President of the United States.
- February 27
  - William Branch Giles, one of Jefferson's allies, proposes nine resolutions against Hamilton in Congress.
  - Washington nominates William Paterson to the Supreme Court but withdraws the nomination the following day.

=== March 1793 ===
- March 1 – The Senate rejects the nine resolutions against Hamilton that had been raised by Senator William Branch Giles.
- March 2 – The 2nd United States Congress adjourns from its second session.
- March 4
  - Washington is inaugurated for his second term as president.
  - Washington nominates William Paterson to the Supreme Court again.
- March 9 – Speculator William Duer stops paying his debts amid falling bank shares.
- March 10 – Several financiers go bankrupt after William Duer stops paying his debts, triggering the Panic of 1792.

=== April 1793 ===
- April 8 – French envoy Edmond-Charles Genêt arrives in the United States when he lands in Charleston, South Carolina.
- April 19 – Washington holds a cabinet meeting to discuss conflict in Europe. They agree that the government should oppose the involvement of any American citizens.
- April 22 – Washington issues the Proclamation of Neutrality, unilaterally declaring that the United States is neutral in the War of the First Coalition against France.

=== May 1793 ===
- May – The French ship Embuscade arrives in Philadelphia. It had captured two British merchant ships during its journey.
- May 16 – Edmon-Charles Genêt arrives in Philadelphia.
- May 18 – Edmond-Charles Genêt meets with Washington. Congress and Washington's cabinet are both reluctant to accept him because he seeks to bring the United States into the war against Great Britain. He offers access to French markets and an end of American obligations to protect the French West Indies, in exchange for American support in the war against the United Kingdom. Jefferson urges the Washington administration to accept the offer, but Washington maintains his position of neutrality.
- May 24 – Edmond-Charles Genêt offers Washington access to ports in the French West Indies in exchange for dissolving French debt.

=== June 1793 ===
- June – Washington is afflicted with a fever and is unable to participate in cabinet meetings about Edmond-Charles Genêt.
- June 5 – Jefferson warns Edmond-Charles Genêt that his establishment of military commissions and admiralty courts in the United States is a violation of American sovereignty.
- June 21 – Anthony Whiting, the overseer of Mount Vernon, dies of tuberculosis.

=== July 1793 ===
- July 4 – Washington hosts over 100 neighbors at an Independence Day celebration in Wise's Tavern in Alexandria, Virginia.
- July 5 – Edmond-Charles Genêt meets with Jefferson and proposes recruiting American officers to fight the Spanish in Louisiana. Jefferson also learns that the Petite Democrate, a British ship captured by Genêt, was preparing to leave with American citizens in violation of Washington's position of neutrality.
- July 6 – Thomas Mifflin, the governor of Pennsylvania, sends a militia to detain the Petite Democrate. Mifflin will recall the militia when Jefferson warns that it may provoke a response from the French navy.
- July 8 – While at Mount Vernon, Washington holds a cabinet meeting about La Petite Démocrate, one of the British ships that had been captured by Edmon-Charles Genêt.
- July 11 – Washington returns to the capital to resolve the Petite Democrate crisis.
- July 12 – Washington and his cabinet decide to refer the Petite Democrate dispute to the Supreme Court. The court will eventually reject the case on the basis that directing foreign policy is not a power granted to the courts.
- July 13 – Washington attends a charity show at Ricketts' Circus, where proceeds go to firewood for the poor.
- July 23 – Washington holds a cabinet meeting on how to get France to recall Edmon-Charles Genêt without hurting diplomatic relations. Philadelphia is subject to regular protests by Ganet's supporters demanding that the United States support the revolutionary French government and go to war with Great Britain.
- July 28 – Polly Lear, the sister of Washington's secretary Tobias Lear and a family friend, dies. Washington rarely attends funerals, and this is the only one he attends during his presidency.
- July 30 – Washington and his cabinet discuss whether they should release documents related their interactions with Edmond-Charles Genêt when having him recalled to France. They decide to postpone the release.
- July 31 – Jefferson gives notice that he will resign in September, but Washington convinces him to stay.

=== August 1793 ===
- August – Washington and his cabinet agree to expel Edmon-Charles Genêt, but Washington grants him asylum upon learning that the French government had replaced Genêt and wished to try him for crimes against the revolution, which would likely result in Genêt's execution.
- August – Philadelphia is struck by a yellow fever epidemic. Ten percent of its 35,000 residents will die of yellow fever over the next two months.
- August 3 – The United States receives news of the Action of 31 July 1793, a battle between the British HMS Boston and the French Embuscade off the coast of New York. This leads Washington and his cabinet to set new rules to ensure American neutrality.
- August 5 – Henry Knox writes a letter to Washington imploring him to contain his temper at the criticisms being printed by Philip Freneau.
- August 8 – The Supreme Court returns a request for legal clarification from Washington in relation to the issue of Edmon-Charles Genêt. Chief Justice John Jay states that separation of powers does not allow for the Supreme Court to issue opinions for the president to consider.
- August 12 – Chief Justice John Jay joins Senator Rufus King in publicly criticizing Edmond-Charles Genêt. Washington feels this partisanship is unbecoming of the judiciary.
- August 19 – Washington summons Attorney General Edmund Randolph to discuss a French dispatch.

=== September 1793 ===
- September 3 – Washington selects Samuel Hitchcock as a recess appointment to the District Court for the District of Rhode Island.
- September 10 – Washington departs from Philadelphia to Mount Vernon to escape the yellow fever epidemic. He leaves Henry Knox, the only administration official who has not fled, in charge of the presidency.
- September 18 – The cornerstone of the United States Capitol is laid with Washington in attendance.

=== October 1793 ===
- October 1 – Great Britain begins seizing ships that trade with the French West Indies, which will ultimately include more than 200 American ships.
- October 11 – Philip Freneau—an ally of Jefferson and one of Washington's most prominent critics—resigns from his position in the State Department. His newspaper, the National Gazette, shuts down in the following weeks.
- October 28 – Washington departs from Mount Vernon to Georgetown, which Hamilton proposed as a temporary capital.

=== November 1793 ===
- November 1 – Washington arrives in Georgetown with Jefferson.
- November 18 – A cabinet meeting ends inconclusively following discussion about how Washington should declare his position of neutrality in the conflict between France and Great Britain.
- November 23 – In another cabinet meeting on American neutrality, Jefferson expresses opposition to fortifying American harbors, fearing that it would grant too much power to the federal government. He convinces Washington to publicly release documents related to negotiations with British diplomat George Hammond, against the wishes of the other cabinet members.

=== December 1793 ===
- December 2 – The 3rd United States Congress convenes for its first session.
- December 3 – Washington delivers the 1793 State of the Union Address. He speaks to the importance of military preparedness in response to the conflict between France and Great Britain.
- December 23 – Washington writes individual letters to the five overseers of his plantation, excoriating them for the damage they did with poor agricultural practices.
- December 27 – Washington nominates his recess appointment Samuel Hitchcock to continue serving in his seat.
- December 31 – Jefferson resigns as secretary of state.

== 1794 ==
=== January 1794 ===
- January 2 – Attorney General Edmund Randolph succeeds Thomas Jefferson as secretary of state.
- January 3 – Madison proposes an economic response against Great Britain when it begins capturing American ships in the West Indies.
- January 13 – Congress enacts a law providing for, effective May 1, 1795, a United States flag of 15 stars and 15 stripes, in recognition of the recent admission of Vermont and Kentucky as the 14th and 15th states. A subsequent act restores the number of stripes to 13, but provides for additional stars upon the admission of each additional state.
- January 27 – William Bradford succeeds Edmund Randolph as attorney general.

=== February 1794 ===
- February 11 – The first session of the United States Senate is open to the public.

=== March 1794 ===
- March 4 – The Eleventh Amendment to the United States Constitution is passed by Congress and sent to the states for ratification.
- March 10 – Hearing that Washington planned to send a special diplomat to Great Britain, the Federalist Party gathers. They agree to have Oliver Ellsworth speak to Washington and push for Hamilton to be selected, but they will be unable to convince Washington.
- March 20 – A law is passed ordering the defense of American ports against Great Britain.
- March 22 – The Slave Trade Act of 1794 is passed, banning the trading of slaves from the United States to another country or the construction and fitting of ships to this end.
- March 24 – Washington issues a proclamation condemning the raising of forces to invade friendly foreign territory.
- March 26 – The U.S. lays a 60-day embargo on all shipping to and from Great Britain.
- March 27
  - The Naval Act of 1794 is passed. It authorizes the construction of six ships for the Navy.
  - The Senate passes a rule ending its policy of closing all of its sessions to the public.

=== April 1794 ===
- April 7 – The House approves a bill by Democratic–Republicans that would embargo the British until they met American demands and sends the bill to the Senate.
- April 9 – Gouverneur Morris ends his tenure as Minister Plenipotentiary to France.
- April 15 – Washington selects John Jay as a special diplomat to Great Britain. This allows an alternative to embargoing Great Britain, leading the Senate to reject the House's embargo bill.
- April 16
  - Washington sends Chief Justice John Jay to negotiate with Great Britain and improve relations between the two nations.
  - Washington nominates Richard Harison to the District Court for the District of New York but later withdraws the nomination.

=== May 1794 ===
- May 5 – Washington nominates John Laurance to the District Court for the District of New York. He withdraws his nomination of Richard Harison.
- May 8 – The Postal Act of 1794 grants permanent status to the Post Office and bans private postal services.
- May 12 – Chief Justice John Jay departs from New York to negotiate with Great Britain.

=== June 1794 ===
- June 5 – The Neutrality Act of 1794 is passed, banning American citizens from enlisting with a foreign nation or planning acts of war against nations not at war with the United States.
- June 9 – The 3rd United States Congress adjourns from its first session.
- June 17 – Washington visits Mount Vernon.
- June 22 – Washington injures his back while riding his horse.
- June 26 – The United States signs a treaty with the Cherokee.

=== July 1794 ===
- July 7 – Washington arrives in Philadelphia after returning from Mount Vernon.
- July 11 – Washington meets with Chief Piomingo of the Chickasaw.
- July 15 – David Thomas Lenox, a federal marshal, serves writs on about sixty people in Pennsylvania who did not pay taxes. Panic breaks out across the region, starting what will become the Whiskey Rebellion.
- July 16 – Citizens attack tax collector John Neville in Bower Hill. One attacker is killed.
- July 17 – A larger group of citizens return to attack John Neville's home again and set it on fire. Two more attackers are killed and Neville flees. David Thomas Lennox is captured and forced to condemn the tax.
- July 23 – Participants in the Whiskey Rebellion meet at Mingo Creek where they select David Bradford, the deputy-attorney general of Washington County, as their leader.
- July 25 – The people of Philadelphia learn of the attack on John Neville.

=== August 1794 ===
- August 1 – David Bradford has a militia form at Braddock's Field, near the nation's capital of Philadelphia. About 6,000 people show up and call for violence against the capital.
- August 2 – Washington's cabinet is split on whether to raise a militia in response to the Whiskey Rebellion.
- August 7 – Washington issues a proclamation ordering the Whiskey Rebellion to stand down. He gives them until September 1, and he raises a militia of 13,000 men to respond if they do not.
- August 8 – Washington approves Henry Knox's request to go to Maine for six weeks to address personal financial problems caused by an investment Knox had made with speculator William Duer.
- August 15 – James Monroe becomes Minister Plenipotentiary to France.
- August 17 – Governor Henry Lee III of Virginia volunteers to fight against the Whiskey Rebellion.
- August 20 – American forces led by General Anthony Wayne defeat British-aligned Native American forces in the Battle of Fallen Timbers in the Northwest Territory. This is the final battle of the Northwest Indian War against the Northwestern Confederacy. The victory significantly reduces the threat of British-aligned Indian tribes against the United States.
- August 28 – The leadership of the Whiskey Rebellion hold a vote on whether to accept Washington's amnesty offer. They vote 34 in favor and 23 opposed, failing to reach a clear agreement.

=== September 1794 ===
- September 5 – William Carmichael ends his tenure as Chargé d'Affaires to Spain.
- September 7 – William Short becomes Minister Resident to Spain.
- September 11 – Thousands of people in Pennsylvania take an oath of loyalty to the Whiskey Rebellion. Moderates are alienated from the movement and begin to support a military response.
- September 18 – Washington sits for a portrait by William Joseph Williams.
- September 25 – Washington issues a proclamation declaring the Whiskey Rebellion to be treasonous and delivers a final warning before dispersing it.
- September 30 – Washington departs from Philadelphia to personally lead soldiers in response to the Whiskey Rebellion.

=== October 1794 ===
- October 4 – In the first and only instance of an incumbent United States president leading men into battle, Washington arrives at Carlisle, Pennsylvania, to guide the U.S. Army's suppression of the Whiskey Rebellion. The rebels soon disperse and the insurrection collapses by the end of the month.
- October 7 – Washington meets with Pennsylvania politicians William Findlay and David Redick in Carlisle, Pennsylvania. They inform him that the Whiskey Rebellion is subsiding in fear of armed conflict with the federal military.
- October 12 – Washington hands over control of the army to Henry Lee III so he can depart for Cumberland.
- October 20 – In Cumberland, Washington inspects the soldiers and orders that they march within the next three days.
- October 21 – Washington departs from Bedford, Pennsylvania, where his military response to the Whiskey Rebellion was being prepared and travels to Philadelphia.
- October 28 – Washington arrives in Philadelphia.

=== November 1794 ===
- November 3 – The 3rd United States Congress convenes for its second session.
- November 6 – John Quincy Adams becomes Minister Resident to the Netherlands.
- November 11 – The United States signs the Treaty of Canandaigua with the Six Nations.
- November 19
  - Great Britain and the United States sign the Jay Treaty, negotiated by John Jay, to resolve issues that persisted after the Revolutionary War and prevent further naval conflict between the nations.
  - Washington delivers the 1794 State of the Union Address. He decries the Whiskey Rebellion and implies that Democratic-Republican Societies—political clubs aligned with Jefferson and Madison—are responsible for creating the dangerous environment. Jefferson and Madison consider this definitive evidence that Washington has sided with the Federalist Party over their Democratic–Republican Party.
- November 29 – A law is passed authorizing the president to station a militia in western Pennsylvania.

=== December 1794 ===
- December 1 – Hamilton gives his notice that he intends to resign as secretary of the treasury in January.
- December 2 – The United States signs a treaty with the Oneida, Stockbridge, and Tuscarora peoples.
- December 8 – The Great New Orleans Fire burns over 200 buildings in the French Quarter.
- December 28 – Secretary of War Henry Knox resigns following a rift between himself and Washington.

== 1795 ==
=== January 1795 ===
- January 2 – Postmaster General Timothy Pickering succeeds Henry Knox as secretary of war.
- January 29 – The Naturalization Act of 1795 is passed, increasing the necessary period of residency for citizenship from two years for five years, and setting a requirement that titles to nobility are renounced. This repeals the 1790 Uniform Rule of Naturalization.
- January 31 – Hamilton resigns as secretary of the treasury.

=== February 1795 ===
- February 2 – Oliver Wolcott Jr. succeeds Hamilton as secretary of the treasury.
- February 7 – The Eleventh Amendment to the United States Constitution is ratified, limiting the ability to sue states in federal courts.
- February 10 – Washington nominates John Pickering to the District Court for the District of New Hampshire.
- February 19 – Washington attends a celebration at Christ Church for the "defeat of the western insurgency".
- February 25 – Joseph Habersham succeeds Timothy Pickering as postmaster general.
- February 28 – The Calling Forth Act of 1795 is passed, authorizing the president to raise a state militia in response to an invasion.

=== March 1795 ===
- March 3 – The 3rd United States Congress adjourns from its second session. Washington calls for a special session of Congress to convene on June 8.

=== April 1795 ===
- April 14 – Washington departs for Virginia.

=== May 1795 ===
- May – Washington returns to Philadelphia.
- May 28 – John Jay returns to New York from the United Kingdom.

=== June 1795 ===
- June 8 – Washington dines with John Adams to consider striking the unpopular Article 12 from the Jay Treaty.
- June 24 – The Senate ratifies the Jay Treaty.
- June 29 – The Aurora publishes a précis of the Jay Treaty. It is poorly received by the public.

=== July 1795 ===
- July 1 – The Aurora publishes the full text of the Jay Treaty.
- July 3 – Washington departs from Mount Vernon to Philadelphia. His trip had been delayed because he had injured his back while riding his horse.
- July 10 – Washington issues pardons to participants in the Whiskey Rebellion.
- July 15 – Washington departs from Philadelphia to Mount Vernon.
- July 18 – Hamilton speaks to a large crowd outside of New York City Hall in support of the Jay Treaty. He leaves after onlookers begin pelting him with rocks.
- July 28
  - George Hammond shares a letter that had been seized and given to him by the British. The letter was by Jean-Antoine Fauchet, who had written to the French government about incriminating conversations he had with Edmund Randolph.
  - After learning of the attack on Hamilton, Washington writes a formal response to reassert that the Constitution gives power over foreign policy to the president and the Senate, not to the broader public.

=== August 1795 ===
- August 3 – The Treaty of Greenville is signed, defining the land opened by the Battle of Fallen Timbers.
- August 11 – Timothy Pickering interrupts a meeting between Washington and Edmund Randolph to privately show Washington evidence that Randolph is a traitor. Washington then resumes his discussion with Randolph and reviews the evidence later that night.
- August 6 – Washington departs from Mount Vernon for Philadelphia.
- August 18 – Washington signs the Jay Treaty.
- August 19 – Washington invites Edmund Randolph to speak with him, Oliver Wolcott, and Timothy Pickering. Washington shows Randolph the incriminating letter by Jean-Antoine Fauchet accusing Randolph of bribery, among other things. Washington interrogates him, and the meeting ends with Randolph resigning "after such treatment".
- August 20 – Secretary of War Timothy Pickering becomes acting secretary of state.
- August 23 – Attorney General William Bradford dies.

=== September 1795 ===
- September 5 – The United States signs a Treaty of Peace and Amity with the Regency of Algiers to pay protection money for shipping access.

=== October 1795 ===
- October 20 – The United States signs a treaty with Spain, opening commerce along the Mississippi River to the Gulf of Mexico, and establishing boundaries between U.S. territory and Spanish Florida.
- October 23 – The Aurora reports that Washington is illegally collecting his salary in advance.
- October 27 – Spain and the United States sign Pinckney's Treaty, granting the United States duty-free access to the port of New Orleans.
- October 28 – Jay's Treaty enters into force.

=== November 1795 ===
- November 1
  - Diplomat David Humphreys negotiates ransom and protection payments to the Regency of Algiers totaling approximately one million dollars.
  - William Short ends his tenure as Minister Resident to Spain.
- November 18 – Washington asks Hamilton to summon Georges Washington de La Fayette to Philadelphia to give him refuge. La Fayette is the young son of Marquis de Lafayette, a friend of Washington's who had been imprisoned during the French Revolution. Hamilton discourages giving the boy shelter because it would be seen as hostile toward the new government of France.

=== December 1795 ===
- December 7 – The 4th United States Congress convenes for its first session.
- December 8 – Washington delivers the 1795 State of the Union Address.
- December 10
  - Secretary of State and acting Secretary of War Timothy Pickering becomes secretary of war and acting secretary of state.
  - Charles Lee succeeds William Bradford as attorney general.
  - Washington nominates former Supreme Court justice John Rutledge as Chief Justice of the United States.
- December 15 – The Senate rejects Washington's nomination of John Rutledge as Chief Justice.
- December 18 – Edmund Randolph publishes A Vindication. He denies the charge of bribery and harshly criticizes Washington.

== 1796 ==
=== January 1796 ===
- January 1 – French diplomat Pierre Adet presents the colors of revolutionary France to Washington as a means to publicly pressure him into supporting the revolution.
- January 5 – Washington quietly has the gift from Pierre Adet sent to the State Department archives.
- January 26 – Washington nominates William Cushing as Chief Justice of the United States, but Cushing declines. Washington also nominates Samuel Chase to the Supreme Court.
- January 27 – James McHenry succeeds Timothy Pickering as secretary of war.

=== February 1796 ===
- February 22 – The House votes against a motion to pay compliments to Washington for his birthday.
- February 29 – Ratifications of the Jay Treaty between Great Britain and the United States are officially exchanged, bringing it into effect.

=== March 1796 ===
- March 1 – Washington declines to grants Congress access to the documents related to the Jay Treaty, causing conflict between Washington and the Democratic-Republican Party.
- March 2 – Representative Edward Livingston requests that Washington turn over the private instructions that he and Hamilton wrote for John Jay on negotiating with Great Britain.
- March 3
  - Washington nominates Oliver Ellsworth as Chief Justice of the United States.
  - The Senate ratifies Pinckney's Treaty.
- March 8 – The Supreme Court issues its decision in Hylton v. United States. It rules that a tax on carriages is an indirect tax and is therefore not subject to the restrictions set by Article One of the Constitution.
- March 20 – The House of Representatives demands that the State Department supply it with documents relating to the negotiation of the Jay Treaty.
- March 24 – The House votes to request the instructions that Washington and Hamilton wrote for Jay. All Democratic–Republicans vote in favor, arguing that the House has an implicit role in review of treaties because it is involved in enforcing them. All Federalists vote in opposition. Washington meets with Vice President John Adams to discuss the issue.
- March 25 – Edward Livingston and Albert Gallatin meet with Washington to formally ask for the documents requested by the House.
- March 26 – Washington holds a cabinet meeting to determine whether the House can ask for documents relating to a treaty ratified by the Senate, and how he should respond to the request. Secretary of State Timothy Pickering prepares a message for the House refusing its request.
- March 29 – Washington delivers to the House an agreement between Spain and the United States. The agreement is incredibly popular in the United States and he hopes this will make the House more amenable when discussing its request for documents.
- March 30 – Washington informs the House that he will refuse its request for documents relating to the Jay Treaty, citing separation of powers. The House will respond by forming a Committee of the Whole for further deliberation.

=== April 1796 ===
- April 11 – The son of Lafayette, Georges Washington de La Fayette, arrives to live with Washington.
- April 25 – Pinckney's Treaty enters into force.
- April 26 – Representative Fisher Ames, while incredibly ill and believed to be dying at the time, attends Congress to speak in favor of Jay's Treaty.
- April 28 – The House votes to consider Jay's Treaty following the surprise affirmative vote of House Speaker Frederick Muhlenberg, splitting with his party. This will cause Muhlenberg's political capital in Philadelphia to expire and his brother-in-law to stab him non-fatally in the chest.
- April 30 – The House votes to fund the Jay Treaty. The affair further sours Washington's relationships with Jefferson and Madison.

=== May 1796 ===
- May 4 – An article is signed expanding on the Jay Treaty.
- May 18 – The Land Act of 1796 authorizes a surveyor general to survey and sell western lands.
- May 19 – The Indian Trade and Intercourse Act of 1796 sets boundaries between the United States and Indian tribes and places restrictions on Americans traveling in Indian territory.
- May 28 – A law is passed authorizes the appointment of agents to seek the release of detained American seamen.
- May 31 – The United States signs the second Treaty of New York with the Seven Nations of Canada.

=== June 1796 ===
- June 1
  - Tennessee is admitted as the sixteenth state of the United States.
  - The 4th United States Congress adjourns from its first session.
- July 7 – Washington rebuffs Jefferson. He tells Jefferson that he regrets defending him against accusations of dishonestly and insincerity.
- June 29 – The United States signs the Treaty of Colerain with the Creek people.

=== July 1796 ===
- July 1 – France protests the Jay Treaty that improved relations between Great Britain and the United States. It responds by suspending provisions of its Treaty of Alliance with the United States.
- July 11 – The United States takes possession of Detroit from Great Britain, under the terms of the Jay Treaty.
- July 17 – Benjamin Henry Latrobe stays at Mount Vernon for a day after arriving in the United States in March.
- July 27 – Thomas Pinckney ends his tenure as Minister Plenipotentiary to Great Britain. He is succeeded by Rufus King.

=== August 1796 ===
- August 8 – The Treaty of Amity and Commerce between Prussia and the United States expires after ten years. It will be restored in 1799.

=== September 1796 ===
- September 15 – Washington submits his Farewell Address to the Cabinet.
- September 16
  - Washington meets with David Claypoole, the publisher of the American Daily Advertiser, to discuss the publication of his Farewell Address.
  - Washington selects Joseph Clay Jr. as a recess appointment to the District Court for the District of Georgia.
- September 19 – David Claypoole publishes Washington's farewell address. Washington warns against political factionalism and foreign involvement. As the address is being distributed, Washington departs from Philadelphia to Mount Vernon.

=== October 1796 ===
- October 13 – Washington selects Benjamin Bourne as a recess appointment to the District Court for the District of Rhode Island.

=== November 1796 ===
- November 4 – The United States agrees to pay protection money to Ottoman Tripolitania with the Treaty of Tripoli.

=== December 1796 ===
- December 1 – The 1796 presidential election takes place. John Adams is elected president. Jefferson is elected vice president under the electoral system of the time that granted the vice presidency to the runner up.
- December 5 – The 4th United States Congress convenes for its second session.
- December 7
  - Washington delivers the 1796 State of the Union Address. He calls for the creation of a university in the capital and a military academy.
  - The Electoral College elects John Adams as president.
- December 9
  - James Monroe ends his tenure as Minister Plenipotentiary to France. The position will remain vacant until December 1801.
  - Washington nominates Robert Troup to the District Court for the District of New York.
- December 21 – Washington nominates his recess appointments Benjamin Bourne and Joseph Clay Jr. to continue serving in their respective seats.

== 1797 ==
=== January 1797 ===
- January 1 – France rejects entry to American diplomat Charles Cotesworth Pinckney.

=== February 1797 ===
- February 17 – Washington nominates John McNairy to the District Court for the District of Tennessee.
- February 28 – Washington vetoes a bill that would shrink the United States Cavalry.

=== March 1797 ===
- March 2 – Washington writes to Henry Knox to express his condolences for the deaths of Knox's three children.
- March 3
  - Washington pardons ten people who were found guilty of treason for the Whiskey Rebellion.
  - The House sustains Washington's February 28 veto.
  - The 4th United States Congress adjourns from its second session.
- March 4 – Washington's tenure as president ends and John Adams is inaugurated as the second president of the United States.

== See also ==
- Timeline of the John Adams presidency, for his successor
- Military career of George Washington
- Electoral history of George Washington

== Works cited ==
- Bevans, Charles I. (1968). Treaties and Other International Agreements of the United States of America, 1776-1949. United States Department of State.
- Bingham, Warren (2016). George Washington's 1791 Southern Tour. The History Press. ISBN 978-1-4671-1979-5. OCLC 928581453.
- Chernow, Ron (2010). Washington: A Life. Penguin Press. ISBN 978-1-59420-266-7. OCLC 535490473.
- Hall, Kermit L.; Ely, James W., eds. (2009). The Oxford Guide to United States Supreme Court Decisions (2nd ed.). Oxford University Press.
- Smith, Richard Norton (1993). Patriarch: George Washington and the New American Nation. Houghton Mifflin Company. ISBN 978-0-395-52442-8. OCLC 26054847.
- Stathis, Stephen W. (2014). Landmark Legislation 1774–2012: Major U.S. Acts and Treaties (2nd ed.). CQ Press. ISBN 978-1-4522-9230-4.
