= Attorney General Hitchcock =

Attorney General Hitchcock may refer to:

- Henry Hitchcock (1792–1839), Attorney General of Alabama
- Samuel Hitchcock (1755–1813), Attorney General of Vermont

== See also ==
- General Hitchcock (disambiguation)
