= M. Wintermute =

American poet (1842–1918)

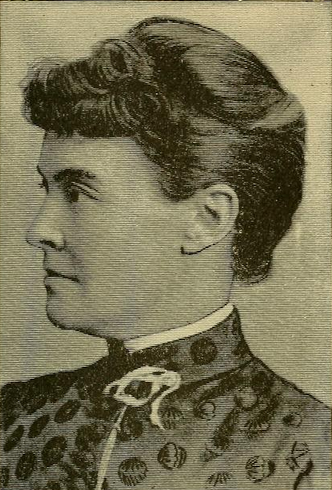
- "A Woman of the Century"
- Born: Martha Vandermark; September 6, 1842; Berkshire, Ohio, U.S.
- Died: January 1, 1918 (aged 75); Newark, Ohio, U.S.
- Occupations: author; poet
- Spouse: Alfred Wintermute (m. 1863; died 1902)
- Relatives: Samuel Hitchcock; Orvil Hitchcock Platt; Elbridge Gerry; Allen Hitchcock; Edward Hitchcock
- Writing career
- Pen name: Mrs. M. Wintermute
- Language: English
- Notable works: Eleven Women and Thirteen Men

M. Wintermute (née, Martha Vandermark; pen name, Mrs. M. Wintermute; September 6, 1842 – January 1, 1918) was an American author and poet whose poems appeared in The Youth's Companion, as well as other papers and magazines. She was a writer of some celebrity, and the author of a volume entitled Eleven Women and Thirteen Men (1887).

== Early years and education ==
Martha Vandermark (alternate spellings, Vandemark and Van Demark) was born in Berkshire, Ohio, September 6, 1842. She was the daughter of Daniel Van Demark (1805–91) and Sophronia Hitchcock (1808–91), who had married in 1841. Daniel was a son of Benjamin Van Demark, of Holland. He was a descendant of the Symmeses, of Holland, who at an early period settled upon the Island of Barbados, and acquired title to a large portion of it. Sophronia descended from the Puritan stock of New England, and was a member of one of the most distinguished families of Connecticut, being a sister of Samuel Hitchcock, of great celebrity, also of Alma Platt, a literary woman, and the mother of Orvil Hitchcock Platt, a United States Senator from Connecticut. Sophronia's father, Benjamin Hitchcock, of Connecticut, entered the American Revolutionary Army at the age of seventeen years and served to the close of the war. He was the father of Samuel Hitchcock, the philanthropist, and of Benjamin Hitchcock, for many years an author and the editor of the New Haven, Connecticut Palladium. His oldest daughter became the wife of a son of Elbridge Gerry, one of the signers of the Declaration of Independence, and also a Vice President of the United States. Roswell Dwight Hitchcock, the theologian, and Allen Hitchcock, the soldier and author, and Edward Hitchcock, the geologist, were of the same ancestors.

Wintermute wrote verses at the age of ten. At the age of sixteen, she wrote a poem entitled "The Song of Delaware," which she brought before the public by reading it on her graduation from the Ohio Wesleyan University, Delaware, Ohio.

== Career ==
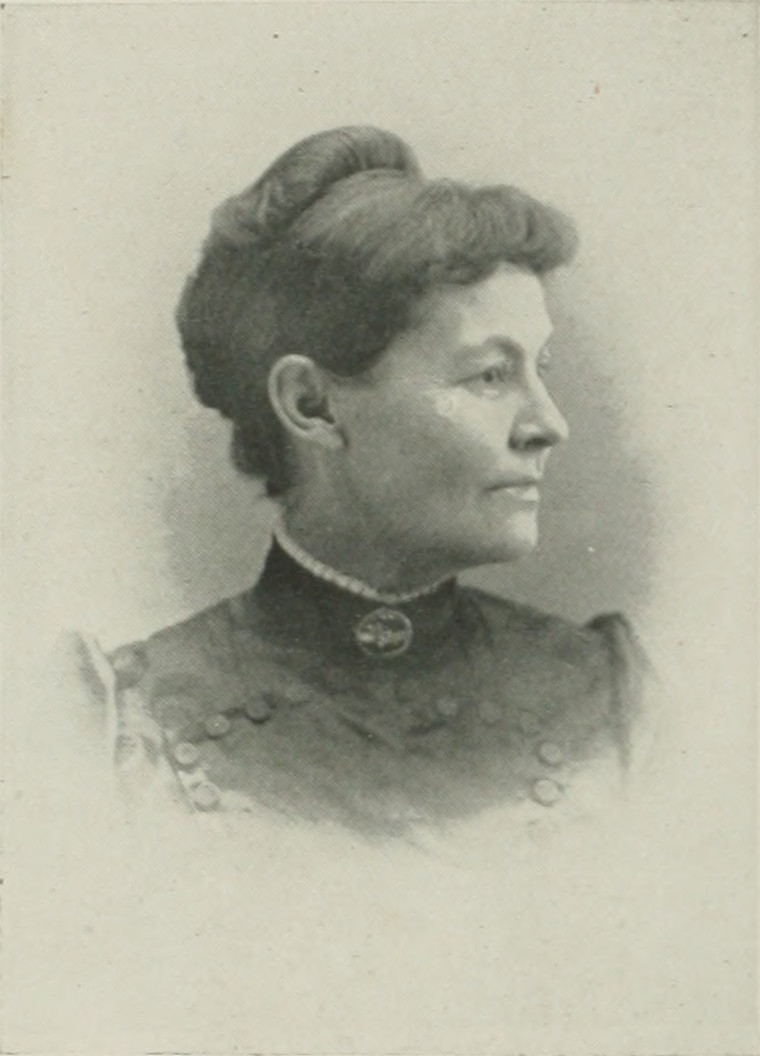
Martha Wintermute, "A woman of the century"

That poem was soon followed by others, which were received with favor by the public. In 1863, (Note: According to Ohio Wesleyan University (1886), Martha and Alfred married on January 4, 1863. According to J. P. Wintermute (1900), they married on June 4, 1863.) she married Dr. Alfred Wintermute (1825-1902), of Newark, Ohio, and for a number of years thereafter, she did not offer any poetry to the public.

In 1888, she began the revision and publication of her writings. In 1890, she brought out in a volume entitled Eleven Women and Thirteen Men, a prose story in the interest of temperance, also containing approximately 100 pages of her poetry, revised and corrected. After the publication of that volume, she published in the newspaper press a number of miscellaneous poems consisting of Easter Anthems, Decoration Day Poems, verses read before pioneer societies, and some on moral and religious topics.

== Personal life ==
The husband practiced medicine for two years at Berkshire and then removed to Newark, Ohio. In the year 1869, they located on a farm near the old "Fort" within two miles of Newark, and were comfortably situated in a farm residence. They were members of the Baptist Church, and were the parents of four children, named Willard Clyde, Josephine Maud, John Adams and Charles Alfred. A few years later, they moved back to Newark. Wintermute died January 1, 1918, in Newark.

== Selected works ==
- Eleven Women and Thirteen Men, 1887
