= Ethan A. Hitchcock (politician) =

American politician (1835–1909)

Ethan Hitchcock
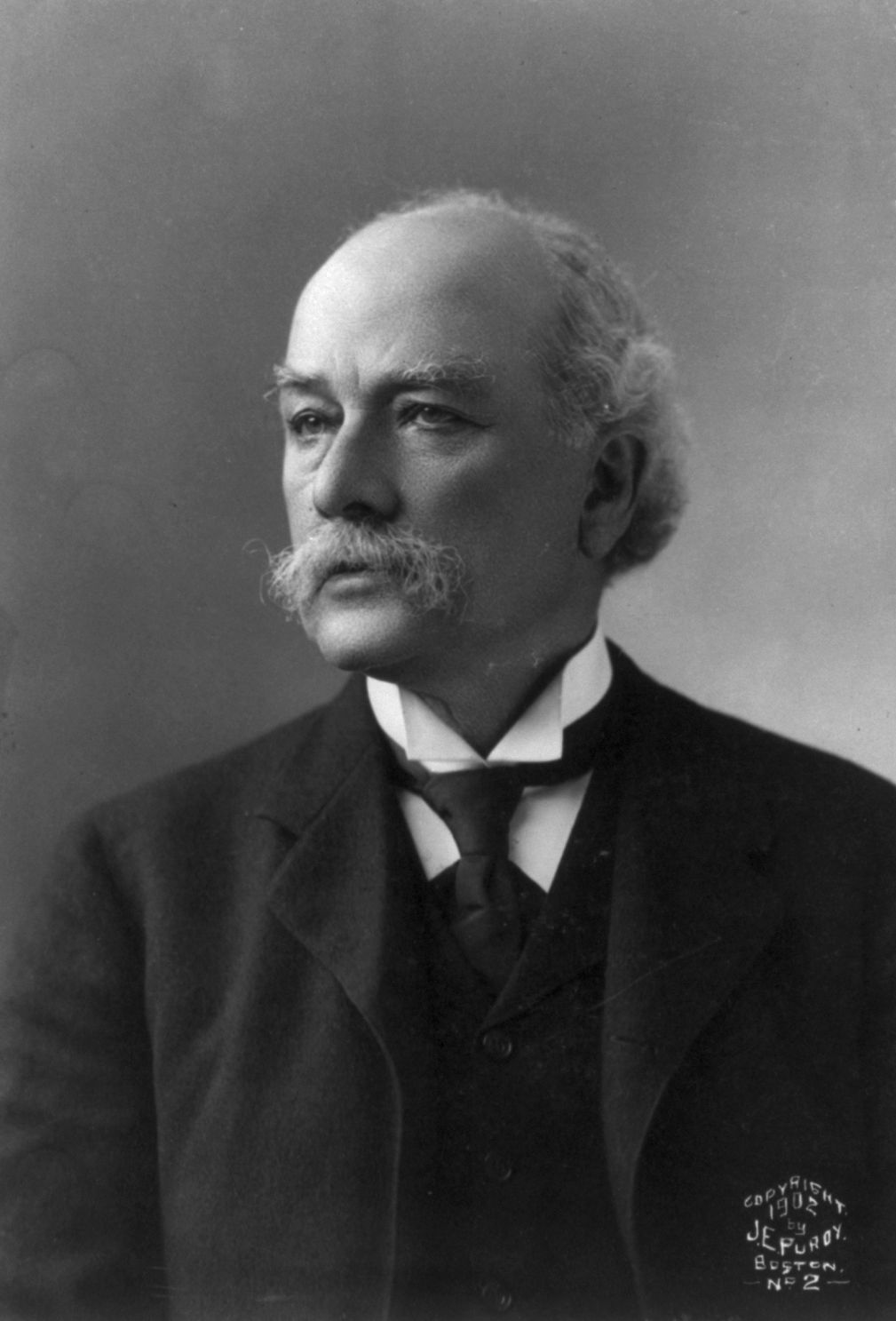
- Hitchcock in 1902

22nd United States Secretary of the Interior
- In office February 20, 1899 – March 4, 1907
- President: William McKinley; Theodore Roosevelt
- Preceded by: Cornelius Bliss
- Succeeded by: James Garfield

United States Ambassador to Russia
- In office December 16, 1897 – January 28, 1899
- President: William McKinley
- Preceded by: Clifton R. Breckinridge
- Succeeded by: Charlemagne Tower Jr.

Personal details
- Born: September 19, 1835 Mobile, Alabama, U.S.
- Died: April 9, 1909 (aged 73) Washington, D.C., U.S.
- Party: Republican
- Spouse: Margaret Dwight Collier
- Children: 3

Ethan Allen Hitchcock (September 19, 1835 – April 9, 1909) was an American politician who served under presidents William McKinley and Theodore Roosevelt as U.S. Secretary of the Interior.

== Business career ==
Hitchcock was born on September 19, 1835, in Mobile, Alabama, the son of Henry Hitchcock (1791–1839), a chief justice on the Alabama Supreme Court, and Anne Erwin Hitchcock. Henry was also the 1st Alabama Secretary of State and 1st Attorney General of Alabama. He was the brother of Henry Hitchcock, nephew of Major General Ethan Allen Hitchcock, grandson of Judge Samuel Hitchcock, and great-grandson of Ethan Allen.

He was in mercantile business at Saint Louis, Missouri, 1855–60, then went to China to enter a commission house, of which firm he became a partner in 1866. He was married to Margaret Dwight Collier on March 20, 1869. Ethan and Margaret Hitchcock had three daughters, Sarah, Anne and Margaret Hitchcock.

In 1872 he retired from business, in 1874 returned to the United States, and in 1874-97 was president of several manufacturing, mining and railway companies.

He was a member of the Missouri Society of the Sons of the Revolution.

== Government career ==
Hitchcock was in his sixties when President McKinley appointed him Envoy Extraordinary and Minister Plenipotentiary to Russia in 1897 and in February 1898 Ambassador Extraordinary and Minister Plenipotentiary, the first Ambassador accredited from the United States to the court of Russia. He was recalled in 1898 to serve in first McKinley's and then his successor, Roosevelt's, Cabinet. As Secretary of the Interior, Hitchcock pursued a vigorous program for the conservation of natural resources and reorganized the administration of Native American affairs.

Hitchcock died April 9, 1909, in Washington, D.C., at the age of 73. Hitchcock was buried at the Bellefontaine Cemetery in St. Louis, Missouri.

Diplomatic posts
Preceded by Clifton R. Breckinridge	United States Ambassador to Russia; August 16, 1897 – January 28, 1899	Succeeded by Charlemagne Tower, Jr.
Political offices
Preceded by Cornelius N. Bliss	U.S. Secretary of the Interior; Served under: William McKinley, Theodore Roosevelt; February 20, 1899 – March 4, 1907	Succeeded by James R. Garfield
