= Electoral history of George Washington =

Elections featuring President of the US

George Washington stood for public office five times, winning four times. After an unsuccessful run for the House of Burgesses of colonial Virginia, he served two terms there. Following the American Revolution, Washington served two terms as President of the United States, and is the only independent and the only person unanimously elected to the presidency.

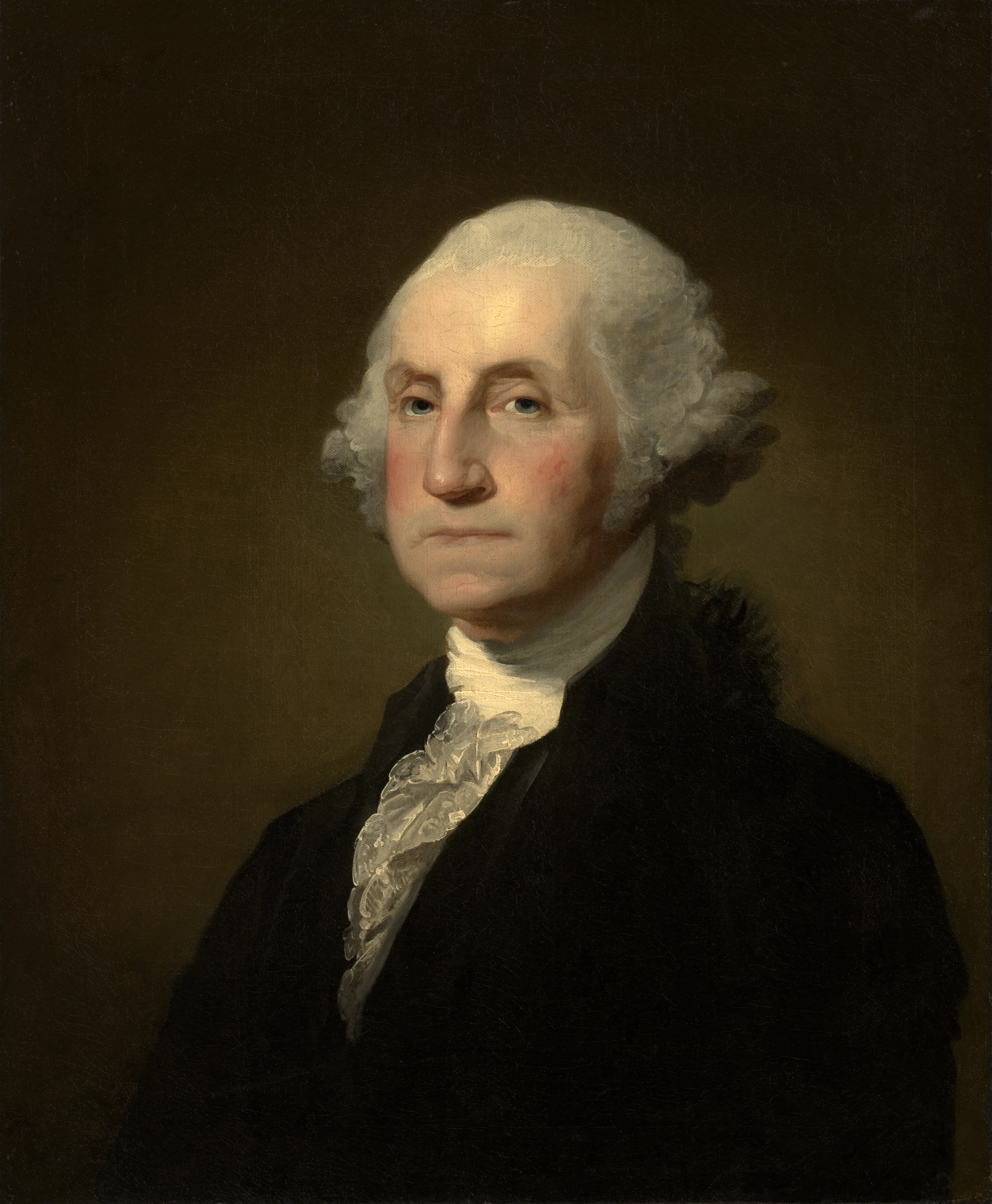
George Washington, c. 1803

== 1755 House of Burgesses election ==
Washington first stood for election to the Virginia House of Burgesses from Frederick County, Virginia in 1755 at the age of 23. Two burgesses were elected from each Virginia county by and among the male landowners. Members of the House of Burgesses did not serve fixed terms, unlike its successor the Virginia House of Delegates, and it remained sitting until dissolved by the governor or until seven years had passed, whichever occurred sooner.

Elections during this time were not conducted by secret ballot but rather by viva voce. The sheriff of the county, a clerk, and a representative of each candidate would be seated at a table, and each elector would approach the table and openly declare his vote. In elections to the House of Burgesses, each voter cast two votes and two candidates were elected who received the greatest number of votes.

1755 House of Burgesses (from Frederick County)
Party	Candidate	Votes	%
Independent	Hugh West	271	46.64
Independent	Thomas Swearingen	270	46.47
Independent	George Washington	40	6.88

== 1758 House of Burgesses election ==
In 1758, Washington again stood for election to the House of Burgesses. Washington's campaign was managed by Colonel James Wood, who procured 160 gallons of alcoholic drinks and distributed them gratis to 391 voters in the county. Washington won the election with more than 39-percent of the vote. Thomas Bryan Martin won Frederick County's other house seat; he was the nephew of the Lord Fairfax of Cameron, governor of Virginia.

1758 House of Burgesses (from Frederick County)
Party	Candidate	Votes	%
Independent	George Washington	310	39.04
Independent	Thomas Bryan Martin	240	30.22
Independent	Hugh West	199	25.06
Independent	Thomas Swearingen	45	5.67

== 1761 House of Burgesses election ==
Washington successfully stood for re-election to his seat in the House of Burgesses in 1761, campaigning with his neighbor George Mercer. The three candidates were Washington, Mercer, and Adam Stephen, and all three had fought together during the disastrous Battle of Fort Necessity in the Seven Years' War. Stephen emerged as a critic of Washington, unlike Mercer, and their rivalry continued through to the American Revolution.

Washington and Mercer received the support of "the leaders of all the patrician families" of the county, while Stephen attracted "the attention of the plebians".

1761 House of Burgesses (from Frederick County)
Party	Candidate	Votes	%
Independent	George Washington (incumbent)	505	42.15
Independent	George Mercer	399	33.30
Independent	Adam Stephen	294	24.54

== 1788–89 United States presidential election ==
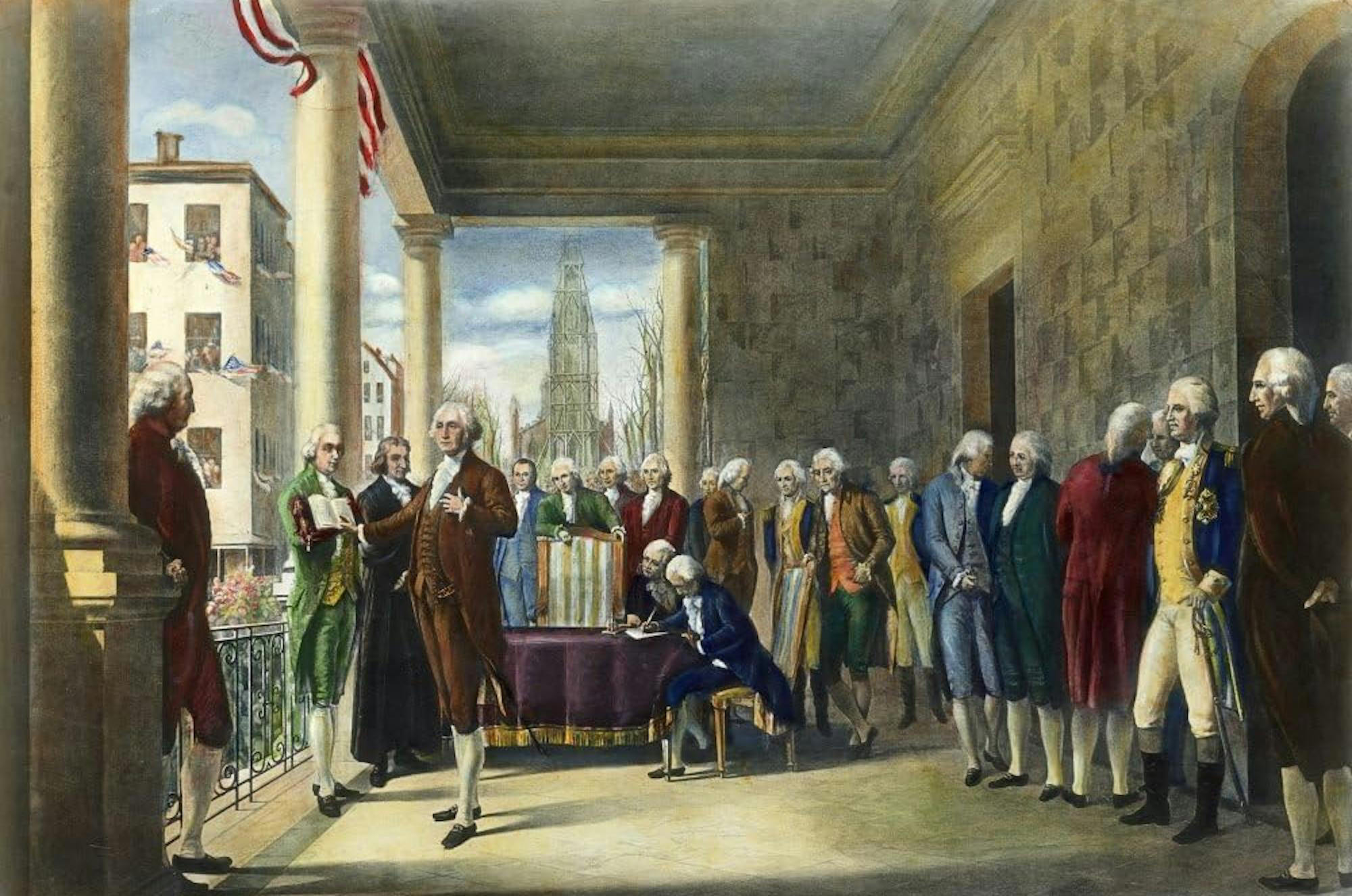
Washington is inaugurated as president of the United States in 1789.

The first U.S. presidential election was held over a period of weeks during December 1788 and January 1789. All 69 presidential electors cast one vote for Washington, making his election unanimous.

No popular vote totals are listed in this table. In early elections, many electors were chosen by state legislatures instead of public balloting, and votes were cast for undifferentiated lists of candidates in those states which practiced public balloting, leaving no or only partial vote totals.

1788–89 U.S. presidential election
Party	Candidate	Votes	%
Independent	George Washington	69	100.00

== 1792 United States presidential election ==
Washington was essentially unopposed in the 1792 election, and was unanimously re-elected president with 132 electoral votes. He remains the only U.S. president to be unanimously elected.

1792 U.S. presidential election
Party	Candidate	Votes	%
Independent	George Washington (incumbent)	132	100.00

== See also ==
- Presidency of George Washington
- Timeline of the George Washington presidency
- 1788–89 United States presidential election
- 1792 United States presidential election
- Second inauguration of George Washington
- List of George Washington articles
