= General Hitchcock =

General Hitchcock may refer to:

- Basil Hitchcock (1877–1938), British Army lieutenant general
- Ethan A. Hitchcock (general) (1798–1870), Union Army major general

== See also ==
- Attorney General Hitchcock (disambiguation)
