= Bar Association of Metropolitan St. Louis =

Bar Association

The Bar Association of Metropolitan St. Louis
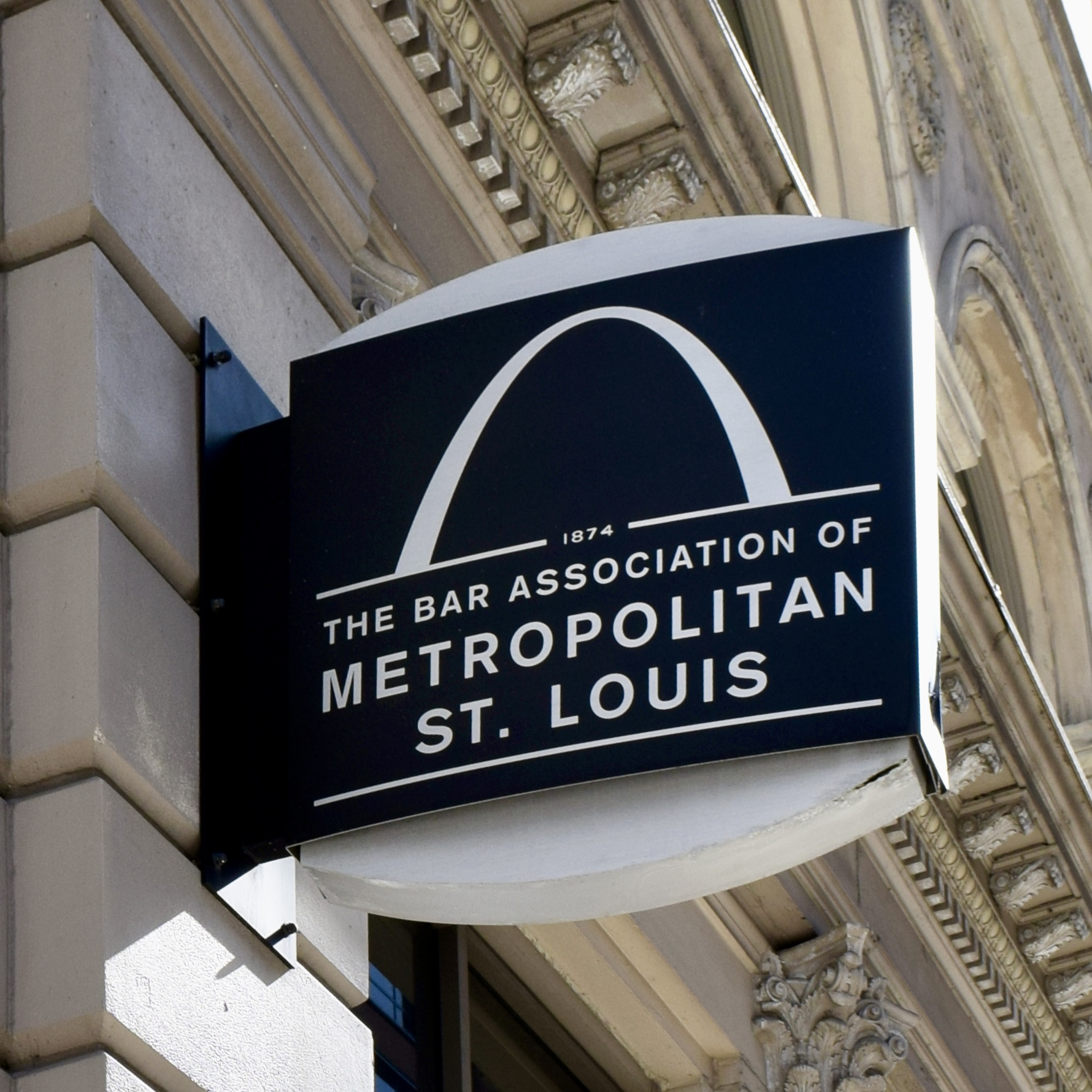
- Formation: March 16, 1874; 152 years ago
- Type: Bar association
- Headquarters: 555 Washington Ave UNIT 100; St. Louis, Missouri, U.S.
- President: Anne-Marie Brockland
- Website: https://www.bamsl.org

The Bar Association of Metropolitan St. Louis (BAMSL) was founded in 1874 by some 100 members of the St. Louis bench and bar. BAMSL currently has over 5,000 members and a vast network of committees and sections.

== History ==
On March 16, 1874, some 100 members of the St. Louis bar and bench convened to organize themselves professionally. Their forum was the Old Courthouse, already known to the law as the place where Dred Scott filed his first state court action seeking his freedom. A month and a half later, they filed Articles of Agreement and a petition for incorporation giving form to the Bar Association of St. Louis. The Articles were filed in downtown St. Louis in what was then, prior to the separation of St. Louis from St. Louis County, the St. Louis County Circuit Court. The organization they established, known since 1967 as The Bar Association of Metropolitan St. Louis, now claims a membership of over 6,000 and a vast network of committees and sections. Yet its key purposes have remained constant: to maintain high standards among practitioners of the law; to be watchful of the fair administration of justice, and to promote social relations among its members.

Two of the Association's early presidents--James O. Broadhead and Henry Hitchcock—met with other lawyers in Saratoga, New York, in 1878 and founded the American Bar Association (ABA). Broadhead became the first president of the ABA; Hitchcock was its 12th in 1889. Five other presidents of The St. Louis Bar Association have headed the ABA: James Hagerman (1903); Fredrick W. Lehman (1908); Guy A. Thompson (1931); Jacob M. Lashly (1940) and John C. Shepherd (1986).

St. Louis Bar Association leaders were also instrumental in formation of The Missouri Bar Association in 1880, the precursor to the present integrated Missouri Bar of which all state lawyers and judges are required to be members. Broadhead and Hitchcock, as well as John Rutledge Shepley and Samuel M. Brechenridge, the first and second presidents respectively of The St. Louis Bar Association, were in the forefront of the 114 lawyers who met in Kansas City to establish The Missouri Bar Association.

Merit selection of judges was formally advocated by the Association as early as 1904. The Association's efforts in this area finally bore fruit in 1940 when the state Constitution was amended to establish the nonpartisan court plan in the Supreme Court, the courts of appeals and the circuit and probate courts of St. Louis and Jackson County. The amendment authorized extension of the plan to other judicial circuits by vote of the residents.

The Bar Association was also responsible for creation of the Legal Aid Society, today known as Legal Services of Eastern Missouri, Inc. The Society was established in a fledgling form in the administration of Daniel G. Taylor, 1909–1910. Its purpose is to provide counsel for indigent persons. In 2022, they expanded and consolidated Pro Bono legal services.

== Current officers ==
- President: Anne-Marie Brockland (Casey, Devoti & Brockland, PC)
- President-Elect: Hon. Kendra R. Howard (U.S. Equal Employment Opportunity Commission)
- Vice President: Kevin Gunn (Law Offices of Kevin D. Gunn)
- Secretary: Amy Rebecca Johnson (Armstrong Teasdale LLP)
- Treasurer: Untress (Trez) Quinn (Armstrong Teasdale LLP)

== Notable past officers ==
- James O. Broadhead (1874–75), first president of the American Bar Association
- Henry Hitchcock (1879–80), president of the American Bar Association and the Missouri Bar
- James Hagerman (1899–1900), president of the American Bar Association
- James C. Jones (1916–17), president of the Missouri Bar
- Guy A. Thompson (1922–23), president of the American Bar Association and the Missouri Bar
- Earnest A. Green (1926–27), president of the Missouri Bar
- Jacob M. Lashly (1928–29), president of the American Bar Association
- Walter R. Mayne (1933–34), second president of the Missouri Bar after integration in 1944
- Kenneth Teasdale (1934–35), president of the Missouri Bar
- Roscoe Anderson (1938–39), president of the Missouri Bar
- Roland F. O'Bryan (1940–41), president of the Missouri Bar
- David L. Millar (1943–44), president of the Missouri Bar
- Forrest M. Hemker (1944–45), president of the Missouri Bar
- Harry Gershenson (1946–47), president of the Missouri Bar
- Richmond C. Coburn (1947–48), president of the Missouri Bar
- Hon. Russell H. Doerner (1950–51), president of the Missouri Bar
- John H. Lashly (1960–61), president of the Missouri Bar
- John C. Shepherd (1963–64), president of the American Bar Association
- John H. Goodwin (1965–66), president of the Missouri Bar
- Robert O. Hetlage (1967–68), president of the Missouri Bar
- James E. McDaniel (1972–73), president of the Missouri Bar
- John Fox Arnold (1975–76), president of the Missouri Bar
- Hon. Richard B. Teitelman (1989–90), first blind Missouri Supreme Court Justice
- Mary-Louise Moran (1991–92), first female president of BAMSL
- Thomas M. Burke (1996–97), president of the Missouri Bar
- Reuben A. Shelton (1998–99), first African-American president of BAMSL
- Bruce Hopson (2011–12), first openly gay president of BAMSL
