= Berkshire, Ohio =

Unincorporated community in Ohio, U.S.

Coordinates: 40°15′56″N 82°54′32″W

Berkshire is an unincorporated community in Delaware County, in the U.S. state of Ohio.

== History ==
Berkshire was laid out in 1804. It is the oldest settlement in Berkshire Township, from which it takes its name. A post office called Berkshire was in operation from 1810 until 1902. An early variant name was Berkshire Corners.

== Notable person ==
- Martha Wintermute, author and poet
