= Fort Stansbury =

Coordinates: 30.2448°N 84.3197°W

Fort Stansbury was a frontier outpost created during the Seminole War (1835—1842), and also used during the Civil War. The fort was located in current Wakulla County, Florida, in between Tallahassee and Wakulla Springs. It was headquarters for the U.S. 3rd Infantry Regiment. Its construction would have been typical of other forts built at the time, utilizing blockhouses and made from split pine trees. According to a contemporary account, of the 600 man garrison, a third became sick due to fever, dysentery, and other illness. The fort was occupied from, at the latest, September 1840, and abandoned by around April 1843. It was under the command of Lt. Colonel Ethan Allen Hitchcock from October 1842 until January 13, 1843. Despite there being no record of an artillery unit posted to the fort, the discovery of an Artillary Corps jacket button suggests that the fort may have been equipped with cannons or other large guns.
