= Report on a National Bank =

The Second Report on the Public Credit also referred to as The Report on a National Bank was the second of three influential reports on fiscal and economic policy delivered to City Secretary of the Treasury Alexander Hamilton. The Report, submitted on December 14, 1790, called for the establishment of a central bank, its primary purpose to expand the flow of legal tender by monetizing the national debt through the issuance of federal bank notes. Modeled on the Bank of England, this privately held, but publicly funded institution would also serve to process revenue fees and perform fiscal duties for the federal government. Secretary Hamilton regarded the bank as indispensable to producing a stable and flexible financial system.

The ease with which Federalists advanced legislation to incorporate the bank impelled agrarian opposition hostile to Hamilton’s emerging economic nationalism. Resorting to constitutional arguments, Representative James Madison challenged Congress’s broad authority to grant charters of incorporation under the Necessary and Proper Clause of the US Constitution, and charging Hamilton with violating a literal or strict constructionist interpretation of the founding document.

Despite Madison's objections, the legislation to form the First Bank of the United States passed, without amendment, in the House by a vote of 37-20 on February 2, 1791, endowed with a twenty-year charter.

== The Debate on the Constitutionality of the Bank ==
Madison's misgivings on the bank's constitutionality raised doubts in President Washington's mind as to the legality of the bank bill. and delayed signing it in order to consult with his cabinet. Secretary of State Thomas Jefferson and Attorney General Edmund Randolph concurred with Madison that the federal government was one of strictly enumerated powers, and bolstered that argument by citing the Tenth Amendment, advancing the position of states' rights and limited federal power.

Secretary Hamilton's famous rebuttal on the Bank submitted to Washington on February 23, 1791, introduced the doctrine of “implied powers,” based on the principle of broad construction of the Constitution. He argued that the authority to create the First Bank of the United States, though not explicitly mandated in the Constitution, was nevertheless inherent to a central government, and required in order to fulfill its duties prescribed in the founding document. This “broad” or “liberal” interpretation swayed President Washington, who signed the bank bill on February 25, 1791.

Hamilton's success in advancing his fiscal and financial schemes moved Madison and Jefferson towards establishing the political foundations for a two-party system. Based on a New York-Virginia alliance, their Democratic-Republican Party would defeat the Federalists in the ”Revolution of 1800”.

== The Bank’s Design, Function and Performance ==
Hamilton's bank – the First Bank of the United States - had a mixture of government and private ownership, and was subject to public oversight. The federal government appointed five of the twenty-five bank directors and held one-fifth (20%) of the Bank's stock. The remaining twenty directors were selected, and the other 80% of the stock was provided, by the investors. The Secretary of the Treasury was presented with statements by Bank administrators to see that the debt limit did not exceed $10 million (exclusive of deposits), and to assure compliance with government rules of incorporation.

Certificates of indebtedness – i.e. government war time debt – had been paid with government securities at face value plus arrears of interest under the terms of Hamilton's First Report on the Public Credit. The new securities were accepted by the Bank to purchase its stock, up to three-quarters (75%) of the value. Based on the collateral of these securities, new Bank notes were issued, producing a dramatic increase in the money supply and serving as the principal circulating medium – the “legal tender” – for the country. Hamilton enlisted the United States in a generous short-term loan arrangement in which the central government borrowed $2 million in Bank stock with funds lent by the Bank itself.

“By 1792”, observed historian John Chester Miller, “largely as a result of the leadership assumed by Alexander Hamilton, the heavy war debt dating from the struggle for independence had been put in the course of ultimate extinction, the price of government securities had been stabilized close to their face value, hoarded wealth had been brought out of hiding, a system of debt management had been created, the power of the Federal government had been decisively asserted over the states, foreign capital had begun to pour into the United States, and the credit of the Federal government had been solidly established.”

The Reports on the Public Credit, and the arguments in favor of the Bank of the United States “laid the philosophical foundation for a genuinely effective national government.

== See also ==
- First Report on the Public Credit - Hamiton's report on public finance.
- Report on Manufactures -Hamilton's report on encouraging manufacturing.
- Federalist Party - Hamilton's political party.
- Political economy - Overview of economic theory research.
