= Ethan A. Hitchcock (general) =

American general

Ethan Allen Hitchcock
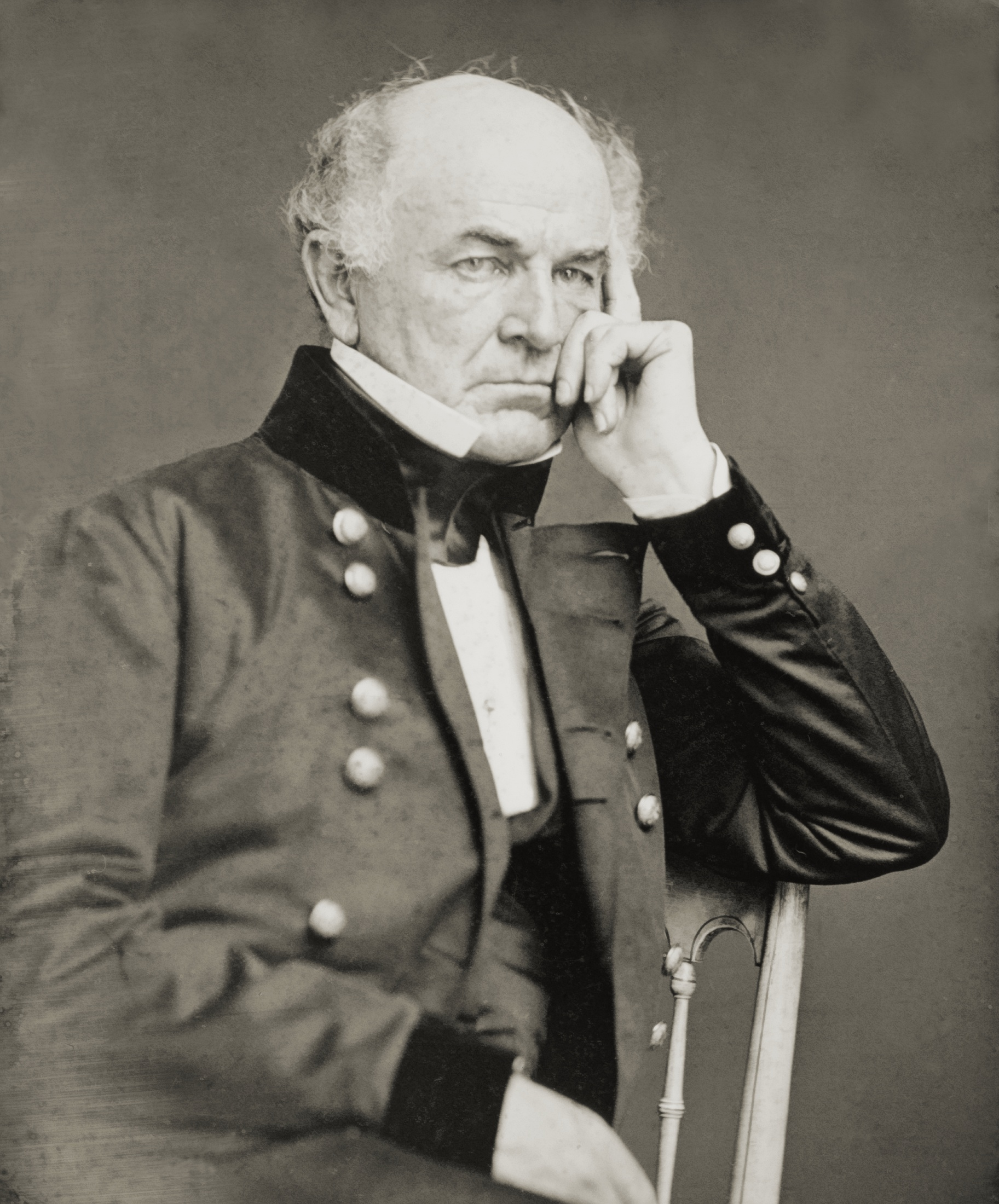
- Born: May 18, 1798; Vergennes, Vermont, US
- Died: August 5, 1870 (aged 72); Sparta, Georgia, US
- Burial place: West Point Cemetery
- Spouse: Martha Rind Nicholls (m. 1868)
- Military career
- Allegiance: United States of America; Union
- Branch: United States Army; Union Army
- Service years: 1817–1855; 1862–1867
- Rank: Major General
- Commands: Fort Stansbury; 2nd Infantry Regiment; Pacific Division; Department of the Pacific
- Conflicts: Seminole Wars; Mexican–American War; Siege of Veracruz; Battle of Cerro Gordo; Battle of Churubusco; Battle of Molino del Rey; Battle of Chapultepec; American Civil War

Ethan Allen Hitchcock (May 18, 1798 – August 5, 1870) was a career United States Army officer and author who had War Department assignments in Washington, D.C., during the American Civil War, in which he served as a major general.

== Early life ==
Hitchcock was born in Vergennes, Vermont. His father was Samuel Hitchcock (1755-1813), a lawyer who served as United States District Judge for Vermont, and his mother was Lucy Caroline Allen (1768-1842), the daughter of American Revolutionary War hero General Ethan Allen; although no likeness from the life of the revolutionary is extant, Lucy said that he strongly resembled Ethan Allen Hitchcock. Hitchcock's siblings included Henry Hitchcock, a Chief Justice of the Alabama Supreme Court, who was married to the sister-in-law of Secretary of War John Bell. Henry's son Ethan Hitchcock served as United States Secretary of the Interior under William McKinley. Another of Henry's sons, Henry Hitchcock, was a prominent attorney in St. Louis.

Ethan A. Hitchcock graduated from the United States Military Academy in 1817 (17th out of 19) and was commissioned a third lieutenant of Field Artillery.

== Career ==
Hitchcock's career progressed successfully but unremarkably until he was appointed as assistant instructor of infantry tactics at West Point in January 1824, being promoted to captain at the end of that year. He played a role in quashing the Eggnog riot in December 1826 with a minimum of bloodshed despite being the target of much of the violence by cadets, but would be sent back to his regular unit the following year by Superintendant Sylvanus Thayer after objecting that Article 92 of the 1806 Articles of War had been contravened by Thayer convening a court of inquiry without direction from the President or a request for same by the accused. Thayer relented, and from 1829 to 1833, Hitchcock served as commandant of cadets at West Point and was promoted to major in 1838.

By 1842, he achieved the rank of lieutenant colonel in the 3rd Infantry Regiment, in command of Fort Stansbury.

He served in the Seminole War in Florida, in the Pacific Northwest, and in the Mexican–American War, where he served as Gen. Winfield Scott's inspector general in the march on Mexico City. He received a brevet promotion to colonel for Contreras and Churubusco and to brigadier general for Molino del Rey.

In 1851, he became the colonel of the 2nd Infantry. From 1851 to 1854, he commanded the Pacific Division and then the Department of the Pacific. Hitchcock was sent to California to stop army officers from speculating. In December 1851, he arrested Joseph Hooker, his assistant adjutant general. Hooker was charged with of conduct unbecoming an officer and a gentleman for profiteering from the army. In his written defense during his trial, Hooker attacked Hitchcock and accused him of persecuting him, which ended Hooker's career in the Pacific Division.

In 1853, Hitchcock ordered the seizure of the Arrow and the arrest of its owner, William Walker, the filibuster in Mexico and Nicaragua. Hitchcock’s actions clashed with the pro-slavery Democrats in San Francisco. This prompted Secretary of War Jefferson Davis to replace Hitchcock with John E. Wool as the commander of the newly named Department of the Pacific.

In October 1855, he resigned from the Army following a refusal by Secretary of War Jefferson Davis to extend a four-month leave of absence that he had requested for reasons of health. He moved to St. Louis, Missouri, and began a presumed retirement, occupying himself with writing and studies of general literature and philosophy.

Hitchcock was a diarist, and his journal entries from this time have served as a crucial source of evidence for Howard Zinn's reinterpretation of United States history, Voices of A People's History of the United States.

=== Civil War ===
After the start of the Civil War, Hitchcock applied to return to the service but was rejected. Maj. Gen Henry W. Halleck, who had a great deal of respect and admiration for Hitchcock, proposed giving him a major general's commission and an assignment in the Western theater, but the 63-year-old Hitchcock declined such a demanding post and preferred to remain in Washington, D.C., in an administrative role. He did get promoted to major general of volunteers, however, and from March 17 to July 23, 1862, he served as the chair of the War Board, the organization that assisted President Abraham Lincoln and Secretary of War Edwin M. Stanton in the management of the War Department and the command of the Union armies during the period in which there was no general-in-chief. (Maj. Gen. George B. McClellan had been relieved of his responsibilities as general-in-chief, and Halleck had not yet replaced him.)

Hitchcock sat on the court-martial of Maj. Gen. Fitz John Porter, which convicted the general of disobedience and cowardice. From November 1862 through the war's end, he served as Commissioner for Prisoner of War Exchange and then Commissary-General of Prisoners.

Hitchcock was mustered out in 1867 and moved to Charleston, South Carolina, then to Sparta, Georgia.

== Personal life ==
On April 20, 1868, he married Martha Rind Nicholls (1833–1918) in Washington, D.C. Martha was a daughter of Isaac Smith Nicholls and Joanna Maria (née Rind) Nicholls.

Hitchcock died on August 5, 1870, at Glen Mary Plantation in Sparta, two years after his marriage. He was buried in West Point National Cemetery, New York. His widow died on August 15, 1918.

The Pale Blue Eye (2022) is a film adaptation of the 2003 novel by Louis Bayard featuring Simon McBurney as Hitchcock.

=== Contributions to alchemy studies ===
By his death, Hitchcock had amassed an extensive private library, including over 250 volumes on alchemy. This collection was widely regarded as one of the finest private holdings of rare alchemical works and is preserved by St. Louis Mercantile Library at the University of Missouri-St. Louis. Through Remarks upon Alchemy and the Alchemists and other writings, Hitchcock argued that the alchemists were actually religious philosophers writing in symbolism. In Problems of Mysticism and its Symbolism, the Viennese psychologist Herbert Silberer credited Hitchcock with helping to open the way for his explorations of the psychological content of alchemy.

A manuscript from the Hitchcock collection

=== Musical collection ===
Hitchcock also played the flute and amassed a sizable collection of flute music. In the 1960s, almost one hundred years after his death, part of Hitchcock's personal music collection was discovered in Sparta, Georgia. This collection, which consists of 73 bound volumes and approximately 200 loose manuscripts, currently resides in the Warren D. Allen Music Library at Florida State University. Included in this collection are works by some of the general's contemporaries, music manuscripts handwritten by Hitchcock himself, and items of personal correspondence. The library's acquisition of these materials was celebrated in 1989 by a recital given by F.S.U. flute students and attended by several of Hitchcock's descendants.

== Selected works ==
- Remarks upon Alchemy and Alchemists (published in 1857)
- Swedenborg a Hermetic Philosopher (1858)
- Christ the Spirit (1861)
- The Story of the Red Book of Appin (1863)
- Spenser's Poem (1865)
- Notes on the Vita Nuova of Dante (1866)
- Remarks on the Sonnets of Shakespeare (1867)
- Fifty Years in Camp and Field (posthumous, 1909)
- A Traveler in Indian Territory: The Journal of Ethan Allen Hitchcock, Late Major-General in the United States Army (posthumous, 1930)

== See also ==
- List of American Civil War generals (Union)
