= Henry Hitchcock (Missouri lawyer) =

American lawyer

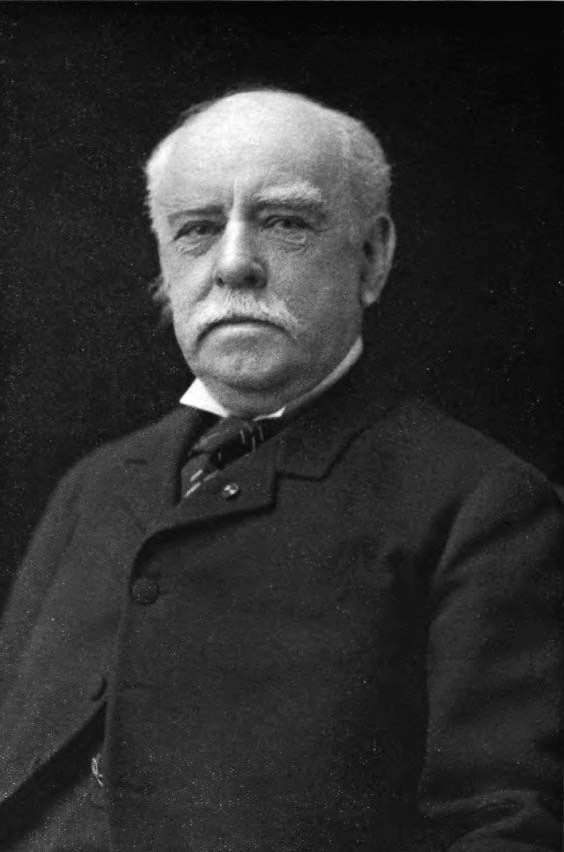
Henry Hitchcock

Signature

Henry Hitchcock (3 July 1829 – 18 March 1902) was a lawyer from St. Louis, Missouri.

Born in Spring Hill, near Mobile, Alabama, he was the great-grandson of Ethan Allen. His father, also named Henry Hitchcock, was born in Burlington, Vermont, and was named Secretary of the Territory of Alabama, and later was successively Attorney General and Chief Justice of the State of Alabama. His brother, Ethan Hitchcock, was Secretary of the Interior under Presidents William McKinley and Theodore Roosevelt.

Hitchcock attended the University of Nashville and Yale University. He studied law in the office of Willis Hall, Corporation Counsel of New York City, and the office of William F. Cooper, who later became a Justice of the Supreme Court of Tennessee. He settled in St. Louis, Missouri, where he was admitted to the bar.

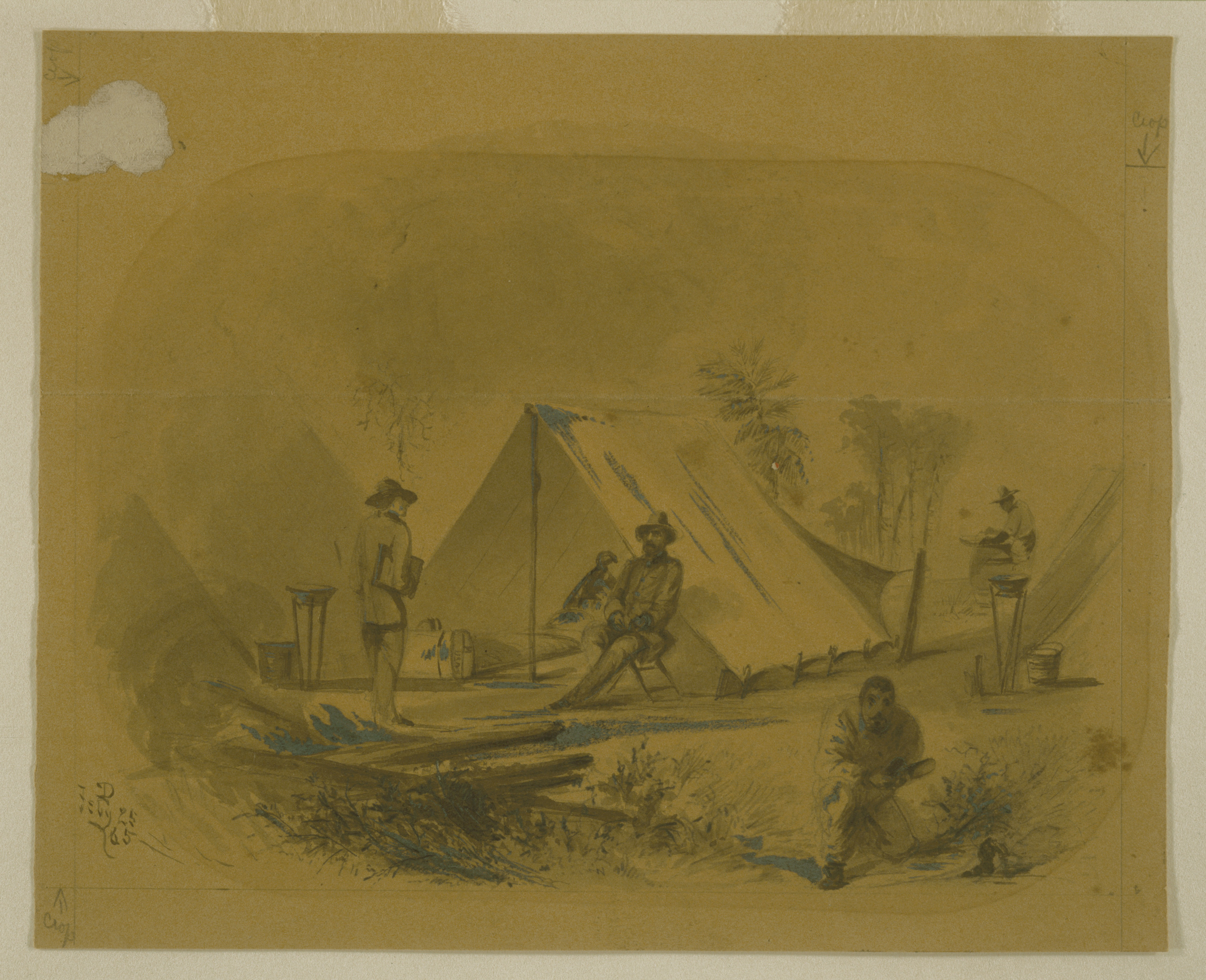
Drawing of Major Henry Hitchcock's tent at Sherman's Headquarters, 25 February 1865, by Theodore Russell Davis

He was active in opposing slavery, and took part in the provisional Missouri state government during the Civil War. He entered the army, served as Judge Advocate on the personal staff of General William Tecumseh Sherman, and participated in Sherman's March to the Sea. Excerpts from Hitchcock's letters and diaries of this period, including the march, were published in 1927 by Yale University Press.

An early president of the Bar Association of Metropolitan St. Louis, Hitchcock was a co-founder of the American Bar Association in 1878. He became the twelfth president of the association in 1889. Hitchcock was elected a member of the American Antiquarian Society in 1882. In 1889, President Benjamin Harrison considered appointing him to the United States Supreme Court, but chose David J. Brewer instead.
