= Henry Hitchcock =

American judge

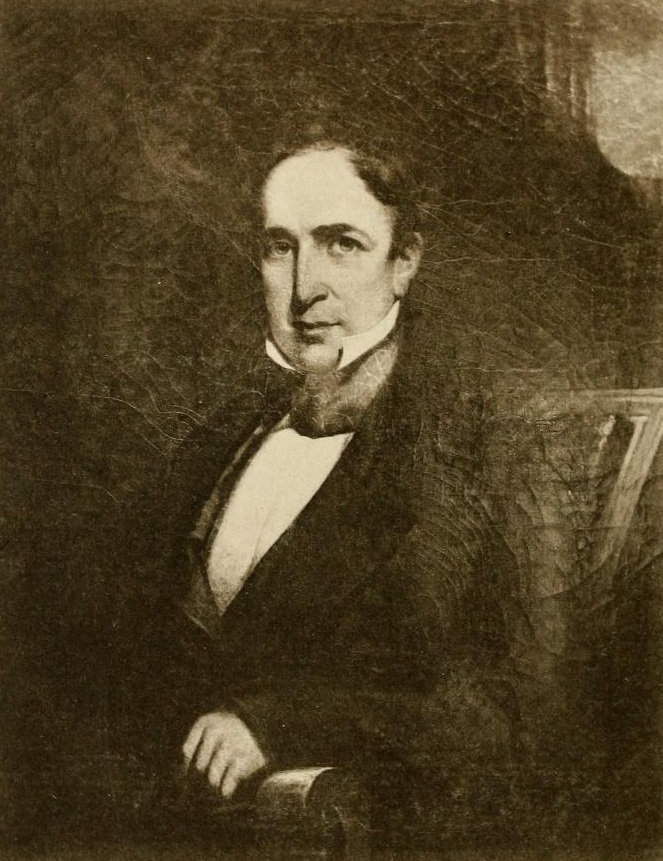

Chief Justice of the Supreme Court of Alabama
- In office 1836–1837
- Preceded by: Reuben Saffold
- Succeeded by: Arthur F. Hopkins

1st Attorney General of Alabama
- In office 1819–1823
- Governor: William Wyatt Bibb; Thomas Bibb; Israel Pickens
- Preceded by: Position Established
- Succeeded by: Thomas White

1st Secretary of State of Alabama
- In office 1818–1819
- Governor: William Wyatt Bibb
- Preceded by: Position Established
- Succeeded by: Thomas A. Rodgers

United States Attorney for the Southern District of Alabama
- In office 1825–1830
- President: John Quincy Adams; Andrew Jackson
- Preceded by: Position Established
- Succeeded by: John Elliot

Personal details
- Born: September 11, 1792 Burlington, Vermont, US
- Died: August 11, 1839 (aged 56) Mobile, Alabama, US
- Resting place: Magnolia Cemetery, Mobile Alabama
- Spouse: Ann Erwin (m. 1821-1839, his death)
- Relations: Samuel Hitchcock (father); Ethan Allen (grandfather); Ethan Allen Hitchcock (brother)
- Children: 8 (including Ethan Hitchcock and Henry Hitchcock
- Education: University of Vermont
- Profession: Attorney

Henry Hitchcock (September 11, 1792 – August 11, 1839) was the first attorney general of Alabama, having been elected by the Alabama General Assembly in December 1819 in its initial session. He was also the Secretary of the Alabama Territory, the position which was the precursor to the modern-day Secretary of State of Alabama.

== Early years ==
Henry Hitchcock was born in Burlington, Vermont, in 1792. He was the grandson of General Ethan Allen, leader of the Green Mountain Boys and hero of Ticonderoga, and the son of Judge Samuel Hitchcock. Major General Ethan Allen Hitchcock was his brother. Henry Hitchcock's son, Ethan Hitchcock, served as United States Secretary of the Interior under William McKinley. Another son, Henry Hitchcock, was a prominent attorney in St. Louis, Missouri.

Henry Hitchcock attended Middlebury College for a while and then graduated from the University of Vermont in 1811. While studying law, he cultivated a small farm in order to provide for the needs of his family. He became a member of the bar in 1815 and handled several important lawsuits before leaving Burlington for the lure of what was then called the Southwest. He traveled by flat boat down the Ohio and Mississippi rivers, eventually arriving in Mobile on January 22, 1816, after a brief stay in Natchez.

== Political career ==
On May 14, 1818, six months after the creation of the Alabama Territory, Hitchcock was appointed its first secretary by Governor William Wyatt Bibb. He also participated in the writing of Alabama's first constitution, representing Washington County in the constitutional convention in Huntsville on July 5, 1819. Hitchcock was elected as the State's first Attorney General by the General Assembly in December 1819. In 1821, he married Ann Erwin (1803-1854). Two sons were Henry Hitchcock (1829-1902), a prominent attorney in St. Louis, Missouri, and Ethan Hitcocock (1835-1909), served as United States Secretary of the Interior under William McKinley. Hitchcock then had the distinction of producing the first book printed in the State of Alabama entitled, The Alabama Justice of the Peace, Containing All the Duties, Powers and Authorities of That Office, which was published in Cahawaba, Alabama, in 1822. In 1826, Hitchcock was appointed United States District Attorney for the Mobile region. On January 9. 1835, Hitchcock was elected to fill a vacancy on the Alabama Supreme Court. He became Chief Justice in June 1836. Hitchcock was also a very astute businessman, reputedly the wealthiest man in Alabama before feeling the effects of the Panic of 1837. On August 11, 1839, Hitchcock succumbed to yellow fever during one of the worst epidemics of that disease in Mobile's history.

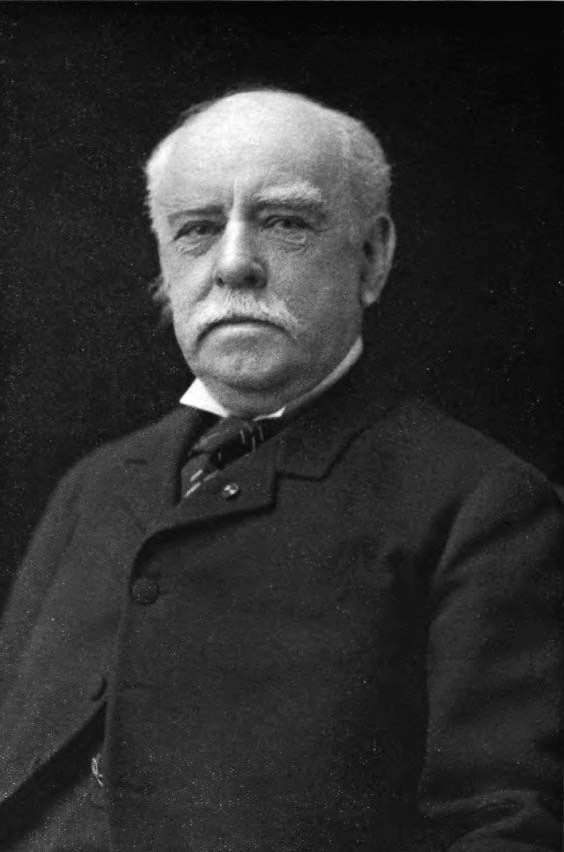
Henry Hitchcock

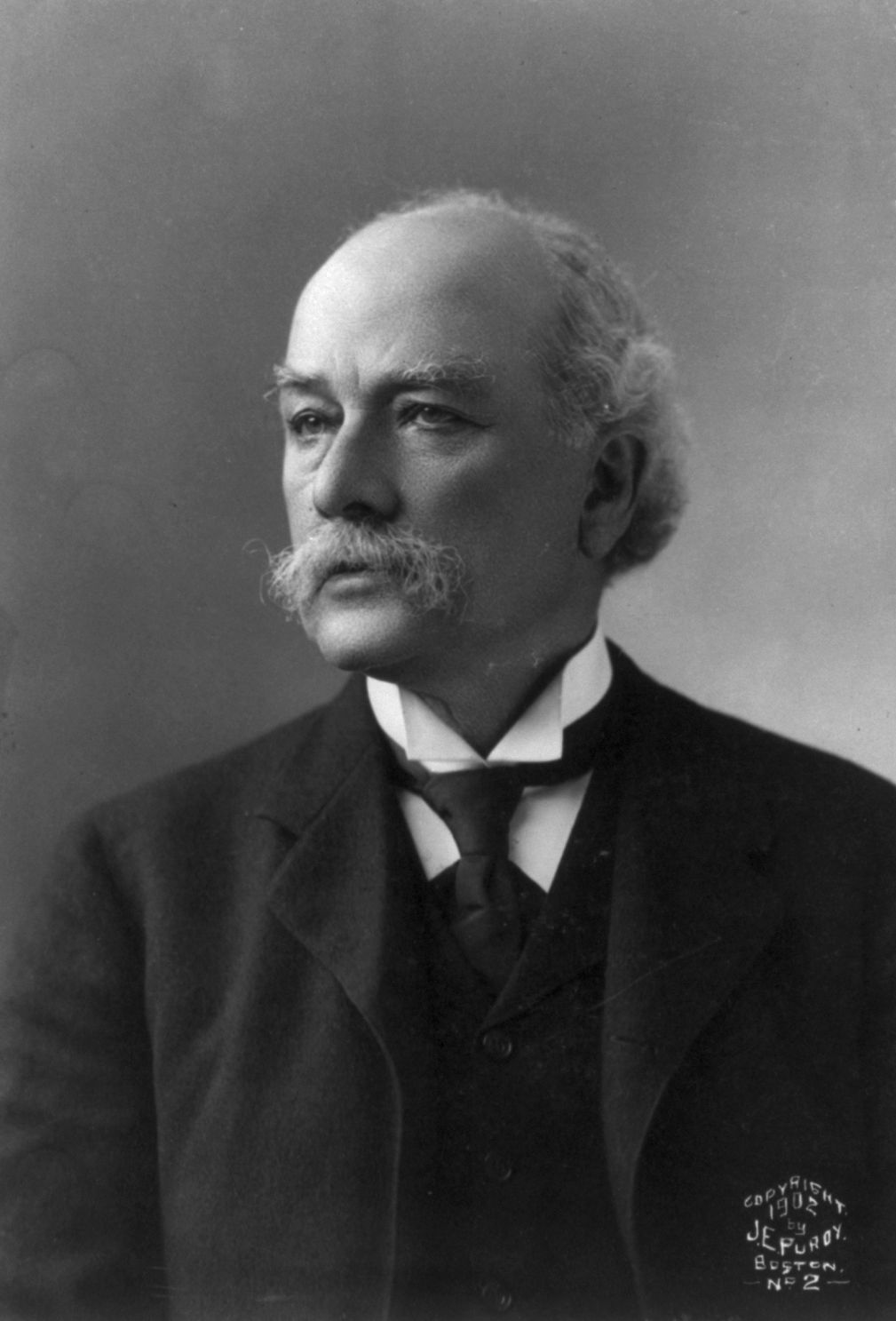
Ethan A. Hitchcock in 1902

== Legacy ==
Theodore Dwight Weld, Angelina Grimké, and Sarah Grimké, authors of American Slavery As It Is, alleged that John Patton Erwin was a slave trader, and "that the Hon. H. Hitchcock, brother-in-law of Mr. E., and since one of the judges of the Supreme Court of Alabama, was interested with him in this traffic."

== See also ==
- Andrew Erwin, father-in-law

== Sources ==
- William H. Brantley, Jr., "Henry Hitchcock of Mobile, 1816-1839." The Alabama Review V (January, 1952):3
- Darell E. Bigham, From the Green Mountains to Tombigbee: Henry Hitchcock in Territorial Alabama, 1817–1819," The Alabama Review XXVI (July, 1973):209

Political offices
Preceded by office established	Secretary of State of Alabama; 1818–1819	Succeeded by Thomas A. Rodgers
Legal offices
Preceded by Reuben Saffold	Chief Justice of the Supreme Court of Alabama; 1836–1837	Succeeded by Arthur F. Hopkins
