= Second inauguration of George Washington =

2nd United States presidential inauguration

Second presidential inauguration of George Washington
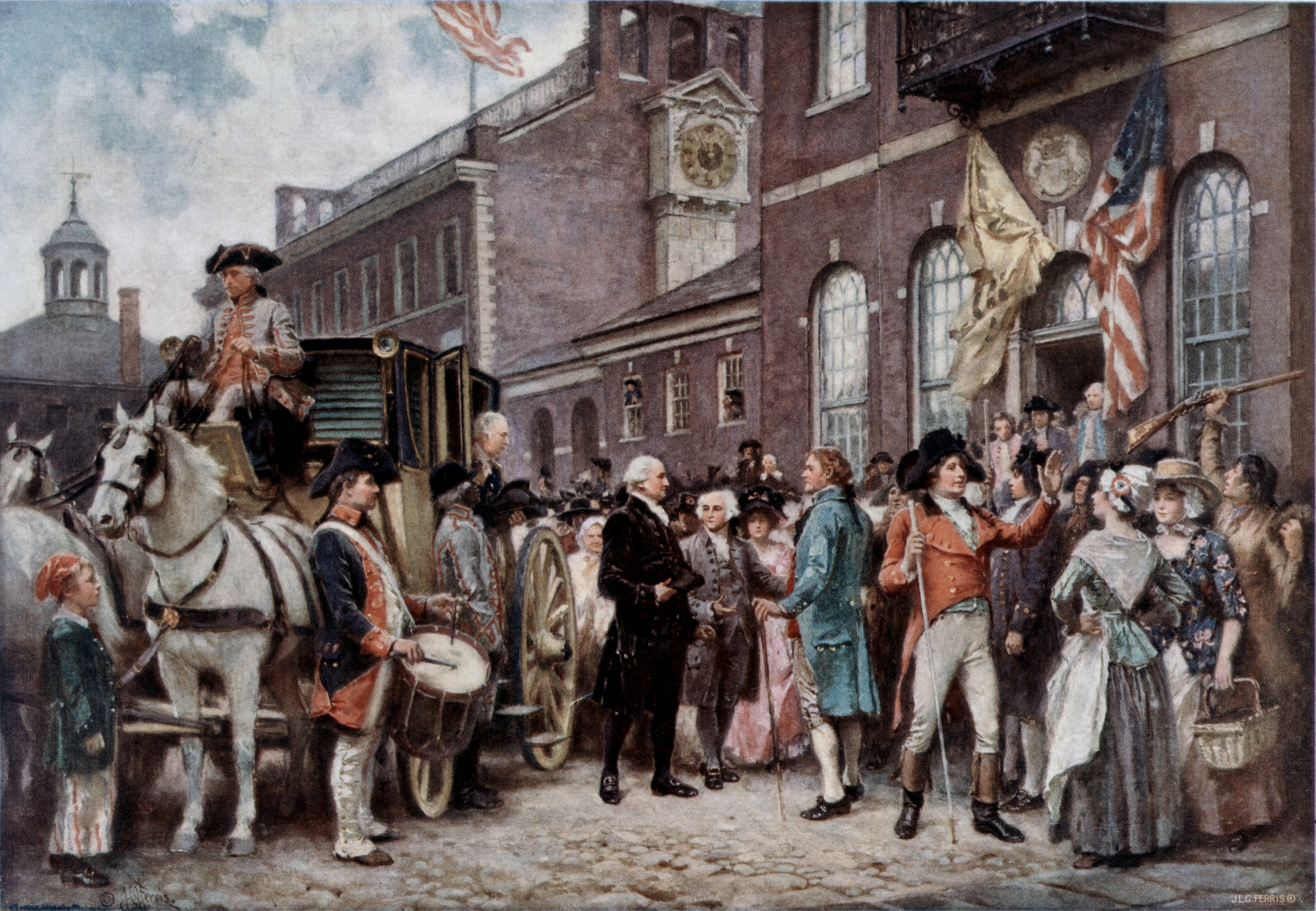
- Washington's inauguration at Philadelphia by Jean Leon Gerome Ferris
- Date: March 4, 1793; 233 years ago
- Location: Congress Hall Philadelphia, Pennsylvania
- Participants: George Washington; 1st president of the United States — Assuming office William Cushing; Associate Justice of the Supreme Court of the United States — Administering oath John Adams; 1st vice president of the United States — Assuming office John Langdon; President pro tempore of the United States Senate — Administering oath

The second inauguration of George Washington as president of the United States was held in the Senate Chamber of Congress Hall in Philadelphia, Pennsylvania on Monday, March 4, 1793. The inauguration marked the commencement of the second and final four-year term of Washington as president and of John Adams as vice president. The presidential oath of office was administered to George Washington by Associate Justice William Cushing. This was the first inauguration to take place in Philadelphia (then the nation's capital), and took place exactly four years after the new federal government began operations under the U.S. Constitution.

== Inaugural address ==
George Washington's second inaugural address remains the shortest ever delivered, at just 135 words.

Fellow Citizens:

I am again called upon by the voice of my country to execute the functions of its Chief Magistrate. When the occasion proper for it shall arrive, I shall endeavor to express the high sense I entertain of this distinguished honor, and of the confidence which has been reposed in me by the people of united America.

Previous to the execution of any official act of the President the Constitution requires an oath of office. This oath I am now about to take, and in your presence: That if it shall be found during my administration of the Government I have in any instance violated willingly or knowingly the injunctions thereof, I may (besides incurring constitutional punishment) be subject to the upbraidings of all who are now witnesses of the present solemn ceremony.

== See also ==
- Presidency of George Washington
- First inauguration of George Washington
- 1792 United States presidential election
