= Samuel Hitchcock =

American judge (1755–1813)

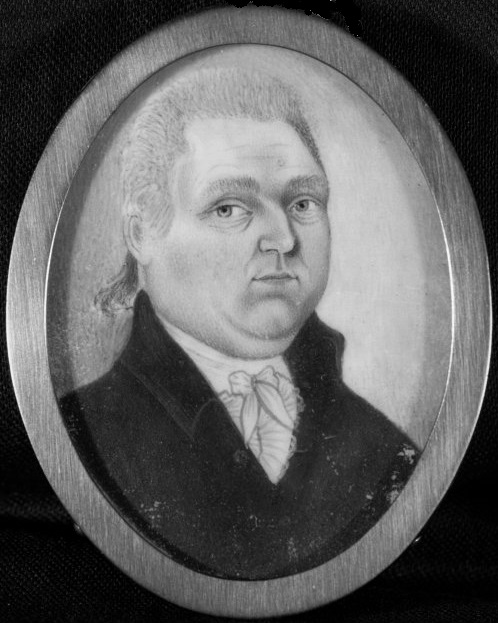

Judge of the United States Circuit Court for the Second Circuit
- In office February 20, 1801 – July 1, 1802
- Appointed by: John Adams
- Preceded by: Seat established by 2 Stat. 89
- Succeeded by: Seat abolished

Judge of the United States District Court for the District of Vermont
- In office September 3, 1793 – February 20, 1801
- Appointed by: George Washington
- Preceded by: Nathaniel Chipman
- Succeeded by: Elijah Paine

1st Attorney General of Vermont
- In office October 1790 – September 3, 1793
- Governor: Thomas Chittenden
- Preceded by: Office established
- Succeeded by: Daniel Buck

Personal details
- Born: March 23, 1755 Brimfield, Province of Massachusetts Bay, British America
- Died: November 30, 1813 (aged 58) Burlington, Vermont
- Resting place: Elmwood Cemetery; Burlington, Vermont
- Party: Federalist
- Spouse: Lucy Caroline Allen (m. 1789-1813, his death)
- Relations: Ethan Allen (father-in-law)
- Children: 6 (including Henry Hitchcock and Ethan A. Hitchcock)
- Education: Harvard College
- Occupation: Attorney

Samuel Hitchcock (March 23, 1755 – November 30, 1813) was the 1st Attorney General of Vermont, a United States district judge of the United States District Court for the District of Vermont and a United States Circuit Judge of the United States Circuit Court for the Second Circuit. He was the son-in-law of Ethan Allen and the father of Ethan A. Hitchcock and Henry Hitchcock.

== Education and career ==
Hitchcock was born in Brimfield, Province of Massachusetts Bay, British America, on March 23, 1755. He graduated from Harvard College in 1777, read law with Jedediah Foster in West Brookfield, Massachusetts, attained admission to the bar, and practiced in Worcester, Massachusetts. He moved to Manchester, Vermont in 1784, where he continued to practice law.

Hitchcock continued private practice in Burlington, Vermont from 1786 to 1787. He was state's attorney for Chittenden County from 1787 to 1790. He was the first Attorney General of Vermont from 1790 to 1793. He was a member of the Vermont House of Representatives from 1789 to 1793. Hitchcock also served as a Justice of the Peace and heard cases in Burlington.

In 1791, Hitchcock was a delegate to the Vermont convention which ratified the United States Constitution and enabled Vermont to join the Union as the 14th state, and was an unsuccessful candidate in its 1st congressional district. Hitchcock drafted the charter for the University of Vermont, was an original member of its board of trustees, and was the longtime secretary of the board. In 1792, he was one of Vermont's presidential electors, casting his ballots for Washington for President and Adams for Vice President. He again ran for the 1st congressional district seat in 1796 as a Federalists but lost to Matthew Lyon after three ballots.

== Federal judicial service ==
Hitchcock received a recess appointment from President George Washington on September 3, 1793, to the seat on the United States District Court for the District of Vermont vacated by Judge Nathaniel Chipman. He was nominated to the same position by President Washington on December 27, 1793. He was confirmed by the United States Senate on December 30, 1793, and received his commission on January 28, 1794. His service terminated on February 20, 1801, due to his elevation to the Second Circuit.

Hitchcock was nominated by President John Adams on February 18, 1801, to the United States Circuit Court for the Second Circuit, to a new seat authorized by 2 Stat. 89. He was confirmed by the Senate on February 20, 1801, and received his commission the same day. His service terminated on July 1, 1802, due to abolition of the court.

== Later career and death ==
Following his departure from the federal bench, Hitchcock resumed private practice in Vergennes and Burlington from 1802 to 1813. He died in Burlington on November 30, 1813. (Note: Many sources indicate November 20. November 30 is verified by the Burlington death and burial record for Samuel Hitchcock, as well as contemporary newspaper death notices, none of which appeared before December 1, 1813.) He was buried in Burlington's Elmwood Cemetery.

== Family ==
Hitchcock was the son of Noah and Mary Hitchcock. He was married to Lucy Caroline Allen (1768–1842), the daughter of Ethan Allen. Their children who lived to adulthood included Lorraine Allen Hitchcock, Henry Hitchcock, Mary Anne Hitchcock, Ethan A. Hitchcock, Caroline P. Hitchcock, and Samuel Hitchcock.

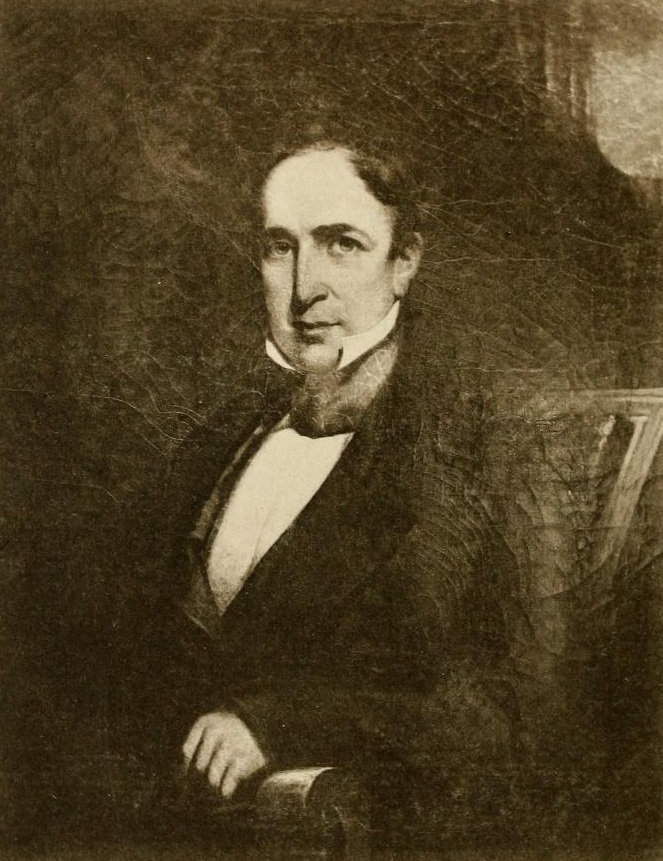
Henry Hitchcock

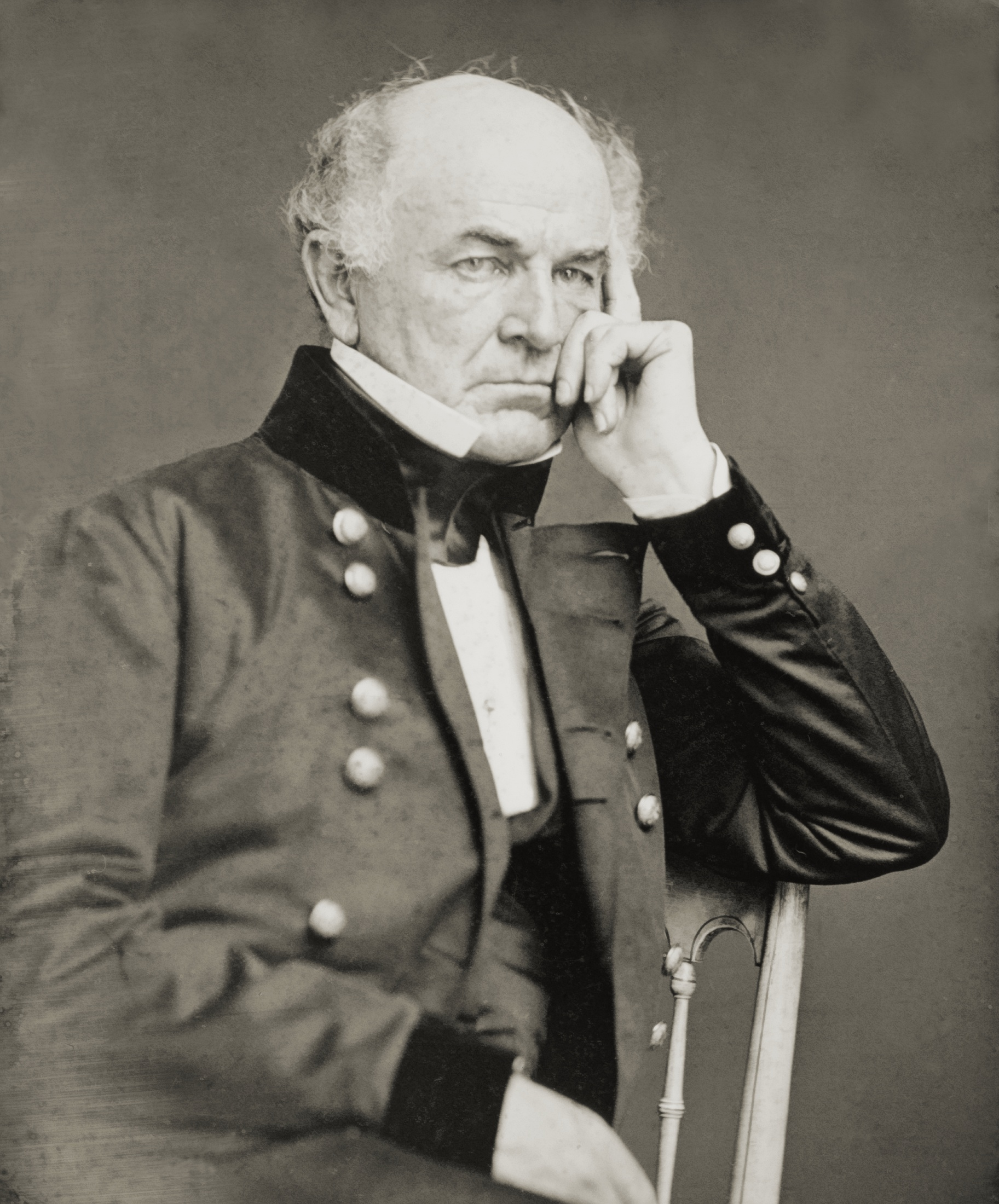
Ethan Allan hitchcock

== Sources ==
Legal offices
Preceded by Office established	1st Attorney General of Vermont; 1790–1793	Succeeded by Daniel Buck
Preceded by Nathaniel Chipman	Judge of the United States District Court for the District of Vermont; 1793–1801	Succeeded by Elijah Paine
Preceded by Seat established by 2 Stat. 89	Judge of the United States Circuit Court for the Second Circuit; 1801–1802	Succeeded by Seat abolished
