= Yeatman =

Yeatman (/jeɪtmən/ YATE-man) is a surname. Notable people with the surname include:

- Bill Yeatman (1839–1901), American baseball player
- Eric Morgan Yeatman, English engineer
- Hoyt Yeatman (born 1955), visual effects artist
- Huyshe Yeatman-Biggs (1845–1922), influential Anglican clergyman
- James E. Yeatman (1818–1901), American banker and philanthropist
- John Pym Yeatman (1830–1910), barrister and influential proponent of British Israelism
- Pope Yeatman (1861–1953), American mining engineer
- R. J. Yeatman (1897–1968), British humorist
- Rex Yeatman (1919–1995), English cricketer
- Timothy J. Yeatman (born 1958), American oncologist
- Thomas Yeatman (1787–1833), American industrialist and banker
- Will Yeatman (born 1988), American football tight end

== See also ==
- Mount Yeatman, a mountain in Alaska
- Taylor, Fladgate, & Yeatman (often simply Taylor Fladgate), one of the largest port wine houses
