= Andrew Erwin (businessman) =

American businessman (1773–1834)

- Born: August 8, 1773; Fincastle County (now Wythe County), Colony of Virginia
- Died: April 19, 1834 (aged 60); Wartrace, Bedford County, Tennessee, United States
- Occupations: Innkeeper, merchant, North Carolina state legislator
- Known for: Antagonist of seventh U.S. president Andrew Jackson
- Spouse: Jane Patton Erwin (m. 1794)
- Children: 8

Andrew Erwin (August 8, 1773 – April 19, 1834) was an American innkeeper, merchant, North Carolina state legislator, freelance imperialist, businessman, and political antagonist of seventh U.S. president Andrew Jackson.

== Early life ==
Erwin was born in Virginia in 1773. When he was about 19, Erwin married his business partner James Patton's sister, Jane.

== Career ==
Andrew Erwin started his career as an assistant to a North Carolina peddler named James Patton. Two years later, he married Patton's sister. Patton and Erwin then became business partners in Wilkesborough, North Carolina, working as innkeepers and merchants.

According to the Chronology of North Carolina, "The firm of Patton and Erwin continued to exist for many years, and branches of it were established in various southern and western villages." According to Patton's autobiography, the partnership began about 1790 and ended about 1810.

Erwin was elected to the North Carolina House of Commons in 1800 and 1801. Erwin relocated to Asheville, North Carolina in 1803, where he took over the store of Jeremiah Cleveland, who had been one of the existing business partners of Patton & Erwin but had himself relocated to Greenville, South Carolina. As of 1803, Asheville had fewer than "a dozen log houses, tenanted by a still smaller number of families." Erwin became the first postmaster of Asheville. Among their business interests was the collection and processing of American ginseng: "In 1808 the noted botanist John Lyon mentioned passing through 'Patton & Erwines ginseng works' near Scott's Creek in Haywood County, which suggests [Isaac] Heylin may have taught them the art of clarification."

Per Patton, when their partnership ended around 1810, they "made a complete dissolution in one day, to the astonishment of every person of understanding: it was effected in the following manner. As he was the active partner, I told him to make a division of the whole, accompanied with a statement on paper, and give me my choice, which he did; and in this way we came to an amicable settlement at once." According to an article published in the Nashville Banner in 1899, "Patton and Erwin were men of far-reaching enterprise. After Mr. Patton's retirement Mr. Erwin associated with himself as partners and assistants his sons, John P. (Patton) Erwin, managing their branch houses in New Orleans and afterwards in Nashville, Tenn., Andrew Erwin Jr., representing his father in Philadelphia, and James P. (Patton) Erwin in Liverpool, Mr. Erwin himself living in Augusta, Ga. He had control of a large body of land in Bedford County, Tenn., the man employed to look after his Interests in these lands being no less person than Andrew Jackson, recently from North Carolina."

Erwin moved to Augusta, Georgia in autumn 1814. Shortly after he moved to Georgia, as the War of 1812 "was closing...he was designated by Governor Hawkins to command a regiment of militia, ordered into service for the defence of our maritime frontiers. The regiment was barely mustered into service under Gen. Gray, at Wadesborough, when intelligence was received of the treaty of peace." Beginning with his move to Augusta, Erwin became "the leading partner in mercantile firms in Savannah, Charleston, Nashville, New Orleans, and many other towns. His operations were too widely extended, and as might have been apprehended, ended in disaster." Patton wrote of his brother-in-law, "Col. Andrew Erwin was a man of a clear head and a good heart, but too credulous and too easily imposed upon by bad men."

In May 1827 Erwin reported that he had found a lost horse in Madison County, Tennessee. Erwin lived in late life at Wartrace, Bedford County, Tennessee, and his widow lived in the family home there until the 1850s.

== Texas ==
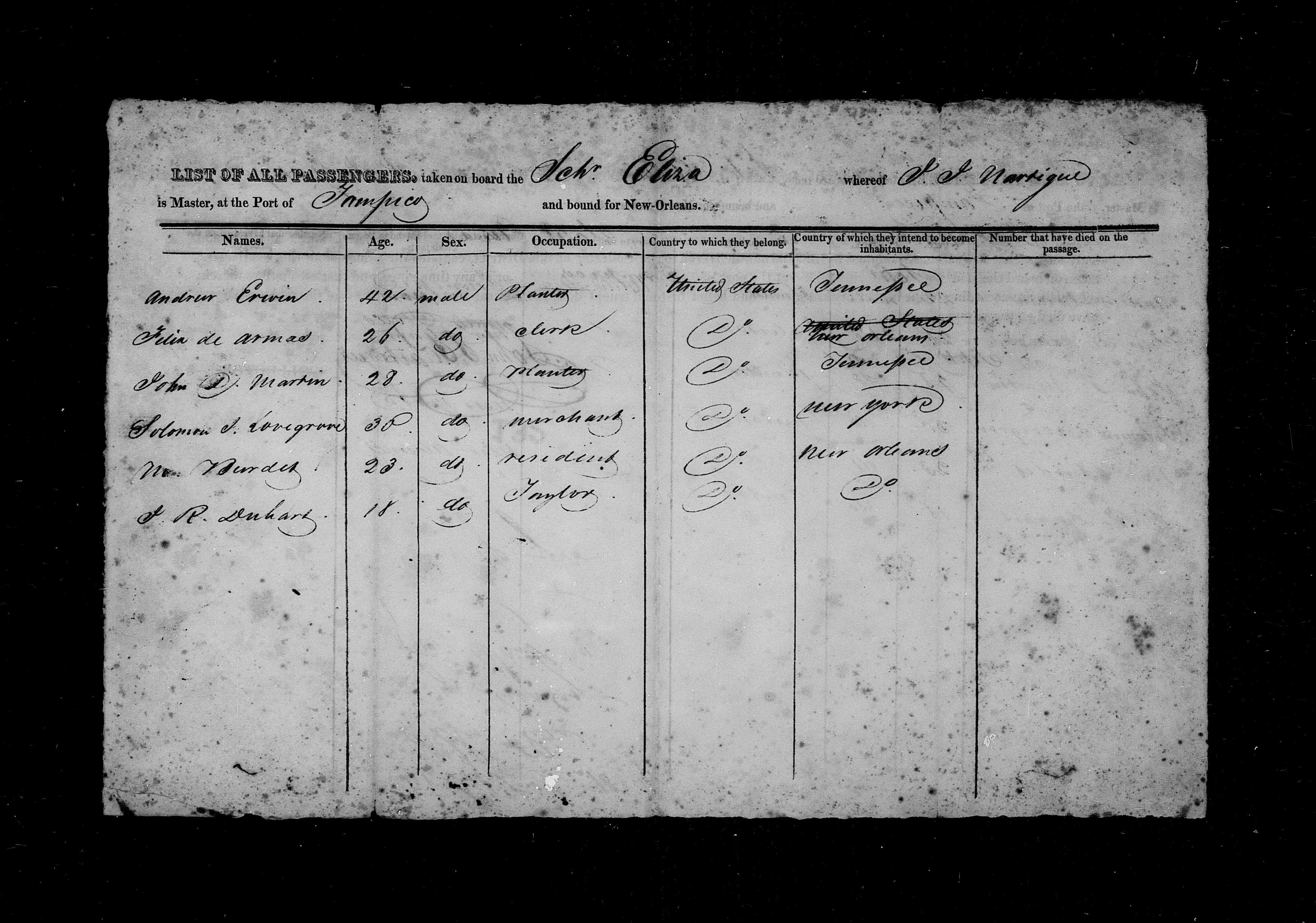
Ship's manifest showing Andrew Erwin traveling from Tampico to New Orleans in 1822

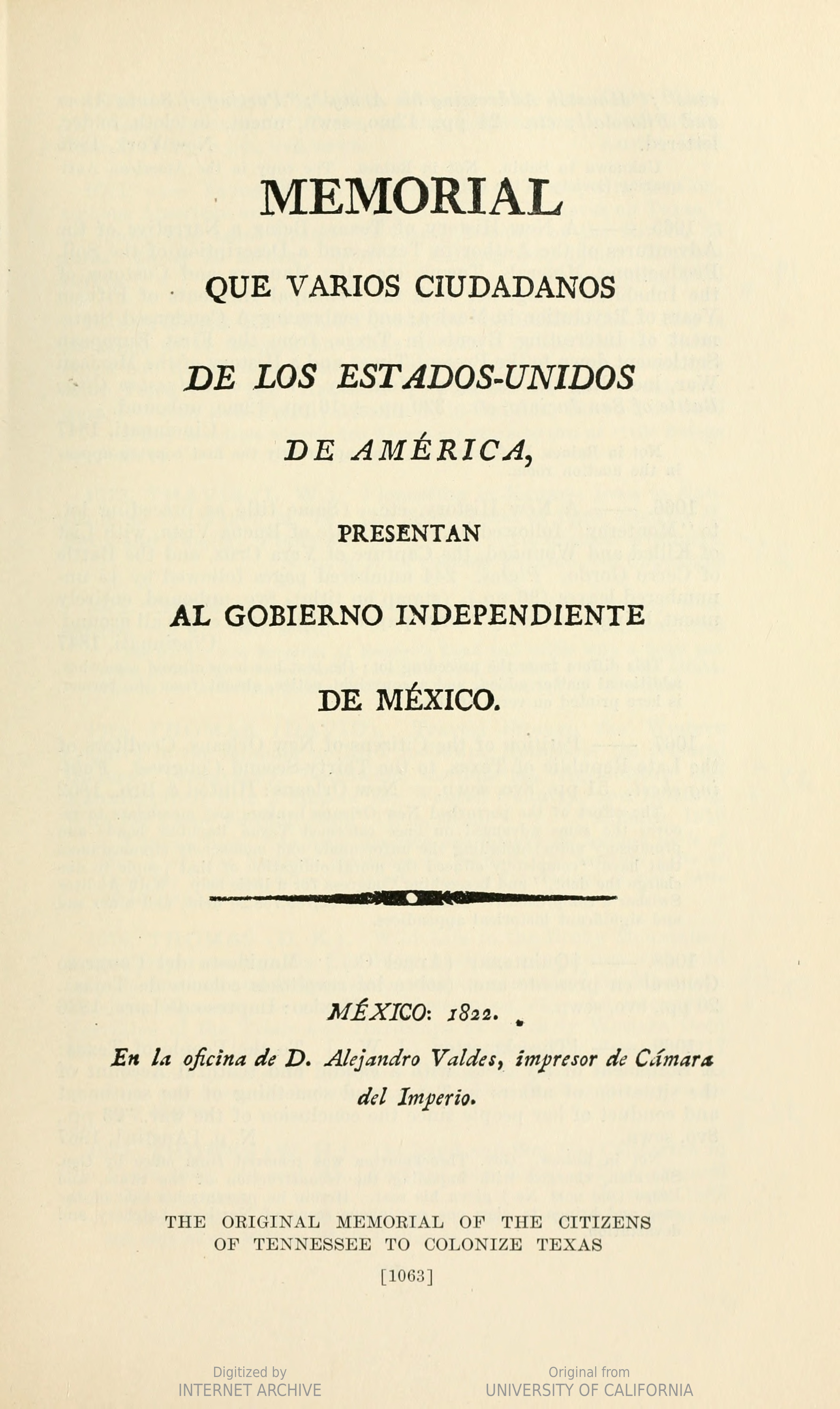
Memorial que varios Ciudadanos de los Estados-Unidos de America, presentan al Gobierno Independiento de Mexico - Mexico: D. Alejandro Valdes, 1822

Shortly after Stephen F. Austin arrived in Texas to open the Austin colony he wrote Joseph Hawkins that he had met with Robert Leftwich and Andrew Erwin of Tennessee about moving settlers from that state in Texas.

Erwin and Leftwich represented the Texas Association of Davidson County, which had been organized on March 2, 1822, with the intent to apply for land grants from the Mexican government and "permission to settle a colony in Texas. The company originally consisted of 52 members and was subsequently increased to 74. Most of the members were business and professional men of Nashville. Their interest had been aroused in part, no doubt, by newspaper accounts of Austin's grant and his preparations to introduce settlers. Robert Leftwich and Andrew Erwin carried the petition to Mexico, where they arrived about the end of April, just as Austin reached the capital seeking confirmation of his own grant." The committee produced a document promising to "cultivate and bring to a rich fruition this great land so valiantly wrested from the miserable Spanish Crown by the noble liberty-loving Mexicanos but a year before (1821). The Memorial is dated March 10, 1822, and is signed by 70 names, among them being that of Sam. Houstom [sic]. The Association's agents were Col. D. Andrew Erwin of Tenn., Felix de Armas of La., and Capt. Robert D. Leftwich of Ky. The concluding pages contain supporting letters from Gov. Carroll of Tenn., Gen. James Wilkinson, and J. D. Blackburn attesting to the honesty of the emigration and to the respectability and upright qualities of those engaged in the enterprise."

== Conflicts with Andrew Jackson ==
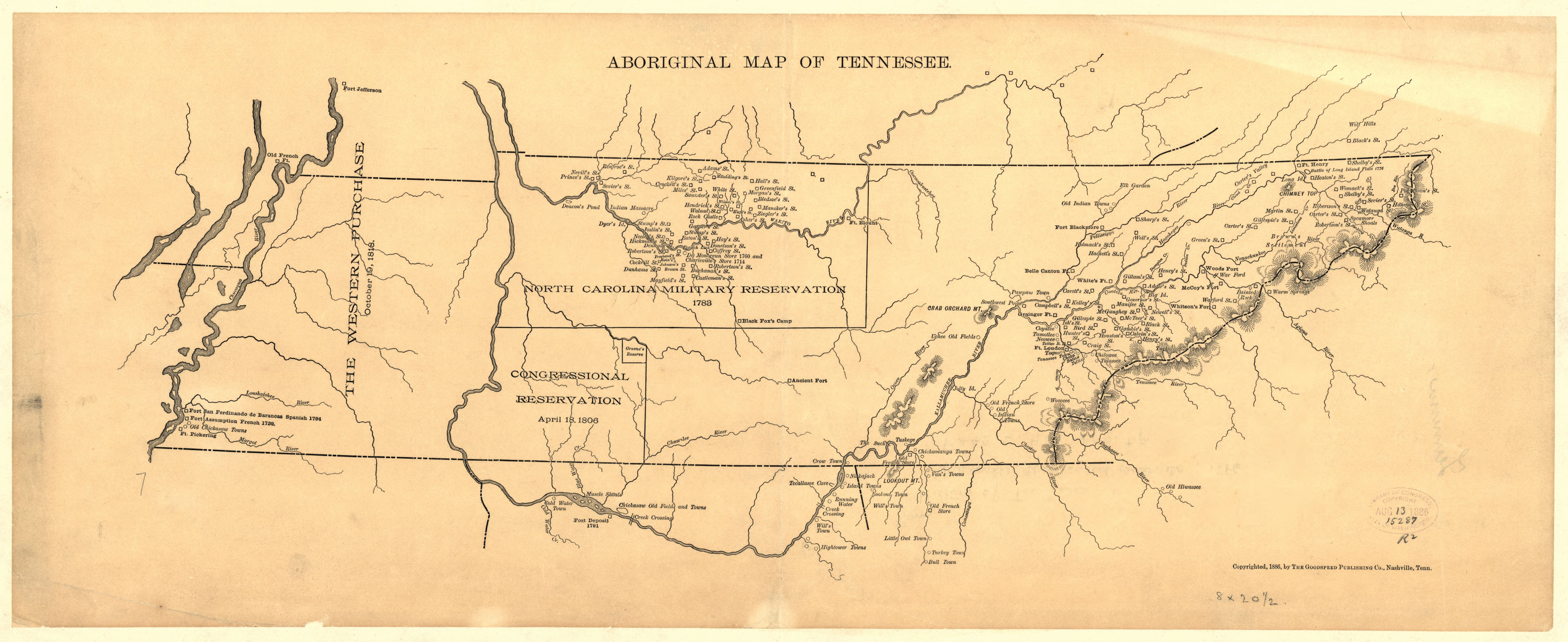
"Aboriginal map of Tennessee" showing what is now called the "Ancient Fort" on the Duck River

Col. Erwin and Gen. Jackson, as they were called, were both involved in something called the Allison land speculation which led to years of legal filings and squabbling between the parties. According to a 1901 telling by a resident of Shelbyville, Tennessee, Erwin was "a joint owner with Gen. Jackson of large bodies of land extending from the old 'Stone Fort', in what is now Coffee County, to what is now the line between Bedford and Rutherford counties, and while looking after his then large landed, interests Jackson was often a guest" of Erwin. In regard to this land, apparently on August 7, 1819, "Colonel Andrew Erwin, on whose land the fort was (which contains about 40 acres within its walls) caused to be cut down a white oak tree, which was growing on the wall. Maj. Murrey and himself counted 357 annular rings in this tree, which was growing on the wall. How long it was after the building of the wall before the tree began to grow, it is, of course, impossible to know. It may have been one hundred or a thousand years. But if no interval be allowed, which, however, cannot be supposed, the fort cannot have been erected later than 357 years previous to 1819, or 1462, 30 years before Columbus discovered America, and 78 years before De Soto made his famous tour of exploration."

The legal/financial disputes arising from this joint ownership led Erwin, and his son John P. Erwin, to join a list of Tennesseans who opposed Jackson's rise to high office, along with figures like John Williams, Jesse Benton, James Jackson, Newton Cannon, Thomas D. Arnold, Wilkins Tannehill, Boyd McNairy, and others.

As part of Jackson's feud with Secretary of the Treasury William H. Crawford he wrote a letter to President James Monroe suggesting an investigation of Crawford's ties to Georgia governor David Brydie Mitchell, who was accused of illegally smuggling slaves from foreign ports to the United States via Amelia Island off Spanish East Florida. Among other things, Jackson wrote to Monroe, "That by calling on Colo. Gideon Morgan of the Cherokee Nation and Colo. Andrew Erwin, now of this state and who is now a candidate for the Marshalls office for West Tennessee, will prove positively that Genl. Mitchell did purchase by his agent who he had furnished with funds for that purpose a large number of African Negroes at amelia Iland, which were brought through the Indian Country to the Agency. My informant states that care must be taken, in putting the Interrogatories so that the witnesses Colo. Morgan and Erwin may not object, as the answers might implicate themselves, they both being engaged in the purchase of Africans at Amelia Island at or about that time, Mr Gross was the partner of Colo. Erwin; about that time and it was to this same Mr Gross that the agent Genl Mitchell gave the passport under which he proceeded to carry his Negroes through the Creek Nation to the Allabama Territory." As told through the testimony of Captain William Bowen, "With $25,000 in letters of credit from Stoutenburgh and Thorn and the house of Erwin & Co., he proceeded to Amelia Island in mid-October, where he found the price of the goods was too high. While he waited on a return boat to Savannah, one of Aury's privateers arrived at Fernandina with a cargo of Africans. Bowen was 'told that the negroes were condemned to the Captors as good prize; and that they were for sale; provided he would take drafts on Savannah. After making enquiry of the goodness of the paper I offered to negociate [sic], and declaring himself satisfied in such an arrangement, we closed our bargain... Shortly after wards the place of delivery being agreed upon, I received the property.'"

According to historian Royce Gordon Shingleton, "[James] Erwin perhaps instructed Bowen to purchase coffee and sugar instead of slaves. The transaction was financed by Erwin, Groce and Co., partly owned by Erwin's father, Andrew Erwin, who was apparently ignorant of the purchase at the time it was made. Bowen, known by both Erwins, had transacted business for them in Savannah and Augusta."

The close examination during the 1828 United States presidential election of Jackson's enslavement of people like Gilbert, and his history of slave trading, was promulgated in large part by Erwin, who, according to historian Mark R. Cheathem was "determined to undermine Jackson's campaign out of personal spite, as well as for political benefit. The national media then seized on the accusations against Jackson as part of a larger discussion about abolitionism and disunion, prompted by the sectionalism of the 1820s." Andrew Erwin was related to Henry Clay by marriage; they shared a set of grandchildren. Erwin, primary author of the Gen. Jackson's Negro Speculations pamphlet, was mentioned in American Slavery As It Is (1839): "It is known in Alabama, that Mr. Erwin, son-in-law of the Hon. Henry Clay, and brother of J. P. Erwin, formerly postmaster, and late mayor of the city of Nashville, laid the foundation of a princely fortune in the slave-trade, carried on from the Northern Slave States to the Planting South." This apparently referred to James Erwin.

In 1828 Erwin also published two letters from Jackson to Aaron Burr dating to the Burr conspiracy era.

== Personal life ==
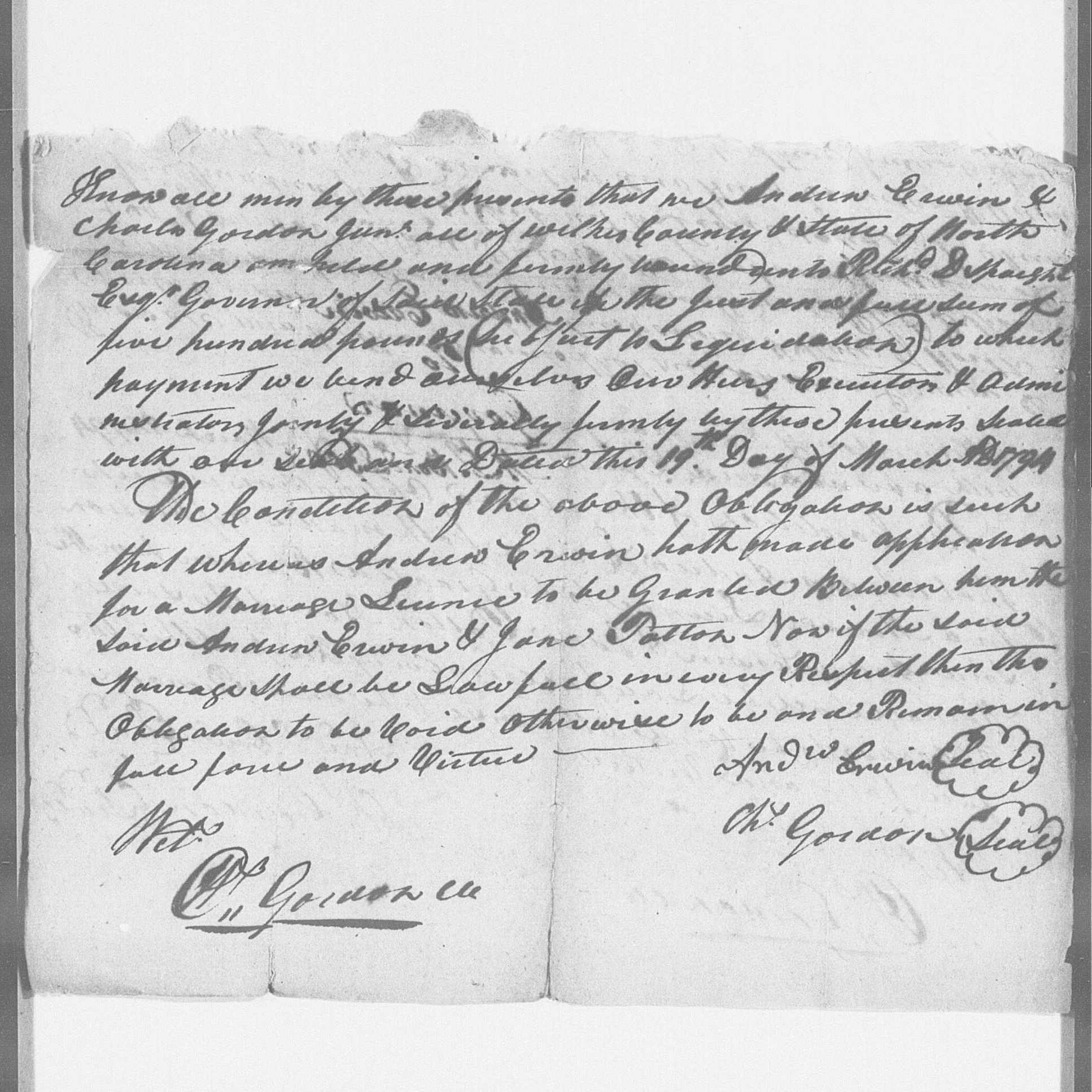
Marriage bond for Andrew Erwin and Jane Patton (1794)

Map of Bedford County, Tennessee, including village of Wartrace c. 1878

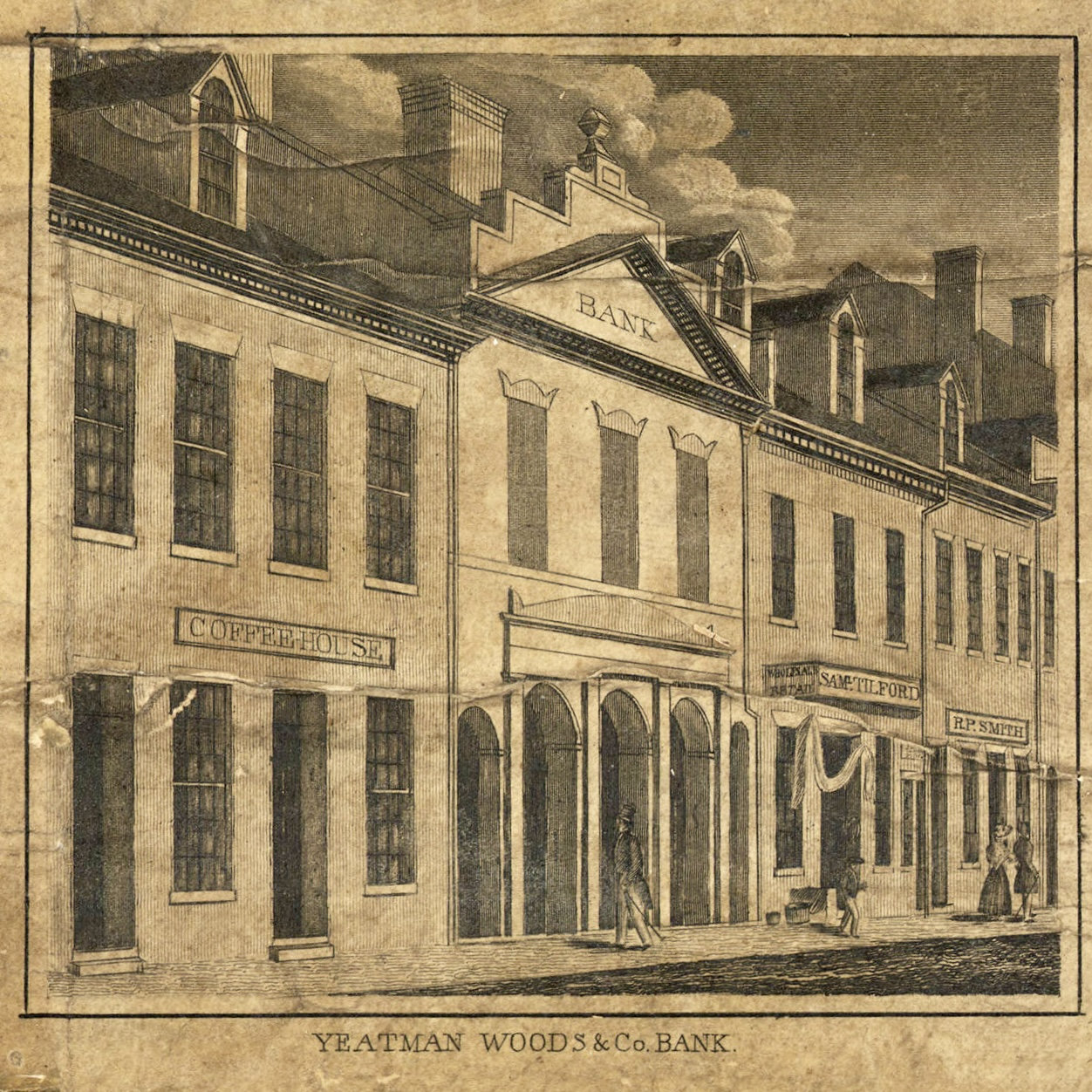
Thomas Yeatman's bank, pictured 1831

Andrew Erwin and Jane Patton Erwin had eight children including:

- Jane Erwin m. (1) Thomas Yeatman, an investor in iron mines and iron works, (2) John Bell
  - William Theodore Yeatman m. Amelia Patton Erwin, a cousin
  - Thomas Yeatman Jr.
  - James Erwin Yeatman
- Mary Erwin m. James Porter of Louisiana, bro. of U.S. Senator Alexander Porter, she and her baby died on the way to Louisiana in 1836
- Anna Erwin m. Henry Hitchcock
  - Andrew Hitchcock, died young
  - Ethan Allen Hitchcock (Note: The Hitchcock brothers married sisters (technically half-sisters) who were daughters of George C. Collier of St. Louis.)
  - Henry Hitchcock
- James Erwin m. (1) Anne Brown Clay (dau. of Henry Clay), after the Erwins died their children were raised at Ashland plantation by Lucretia and Henry Clay, (2) Margaret Johnson, niece of Richard Mentor Johnson; according to a granddaughter, he was a "Southern gentleman of great wealth and courtly manners, residing at what is now known as Woodland Park, where he dispensed the most elegant hospitality to a circle of friends."
  - Andrew Eugene Erwin, Confederate killed at Vicksburg
- Andrew Erwin Jr. m. Elvira Jane Searcy, dau. of Robert Searcy, aide-de-camp to Jackson in War of 1812
  - Frances Ann Erwin m. William H. Pope, son of LeRoy Pope
- John Patton Erwin m. Frances "Fanny" Lanier Williams, sister of John Williams, Lewis Williams, and judge Thomas Lanier Williams

== House ==
One account says that Erwin's house in Wartrace was called Beechwood. Another account says it was simply called Brick House. A 1901 survey of Bedford County landmarks stated, "There is an old dirt road in this county known by the county records and many land surveys as the Brick House road. It was so called from the first brick house erected in what is now Bedford County. This house was erected the late Col. Andrew Erwin Sr., during the first decade of the last century, and it stood only a mile or so from where Wartrace now stands. The road was surveyed and cut out in 1810 and was intended as thoroughfare between the 'brick house' and the then newly laid out town of Shelbyville, and it was on this road that at an early day hundreds of early settlers traveled in order to see the 'brick house' which in that day and time was a sight worth looking at."

== See also ==
- Old Buncombe Road
- Amelia Island Affair
- Patriot War (Florida)
- Second Seminole War
- List of Texas slave traders

== Sources ==
- Apple, Lindsey (2011). The Family Legacy of Henry Clay: In the Shadow of a Kentucky Patriarch. Topics in Kentucky History. Lexington, Kentucky: University Press of Kentucky. ISBN 978-0-8131-3410-9. LCCN 2011019756. OCLC 753969024. Project MUSE book 2573.
- Cheathem, Mark R. (October 2011). Slavery, Kinship, and Andrew Jackson's Presidential Campaign of 1828 (PDF). Southern Historical Association Annual Meeting. jacksonianamerica.com. Archived (PDF) from the original on 2024-08-22.
- Fair, John D. (2015). "Governor David B. Mitchell and the "Black Birds" Slave Smuggling Scandal". The Georgia Historical Quarterly. 99 (4): 253–289. ISSN 0016-8297. JSTOR 24636783.
- Manget, Luke (2022). Ginseng Diggers: A History of Root and Herb Gathering in Appalachia. The University Press of Kentucky. doi:10.2307/j.ctv280b8gj.5. ISBN 978-0-8131-8382-4. JSTOR j.ctv280b8gj.
- Murphy, James Edward (1971). "Jackson and the Tennessee Opposition". Tennessee Historical Quarterly. 30 (1): 50–69. ISSN 0040-3261. JSTOR 42623203.
- Patton, J. (1850). Biography of James Patton. Asheville, North Carolina: No publisher stated. OCLC 46452157. OL 25397531M. – Also digitized by UNC's Documenting the American South project.
- Shingleton, Royce Gordon (July 1973). "David Brydie Mitchell and the African Importation Case of 1820". The Journal of Negro History. 58 (3): 327–340. doi:10.2307/2716781. ISSN 0022-2992. JSTOR 2716781.
- Weld, Theodore Dwight; Grimké, Angelina; Grimké, Sarah Moore (1839). American Slavery As It Is: Testimony of a Thousand Witnesses. American Anti-Slavery Society. New York: Published by the American Anti-Slavery Society, office, no. 143 Nassau Street. LCCN 11008377. OCLC 14906369. OL 20509019M. This article incorporates text from this source, which is in the public domain.
