= Andrew Erwin =

Andrew Erwin may refer to:

- Andrew Erwin (businessman) (1773–1834), an American merchant
- Andrew Erwin (b. 1978), a film director, one of Erwin brothers
