= John Patton Erwin =

American politician (1795–1857)

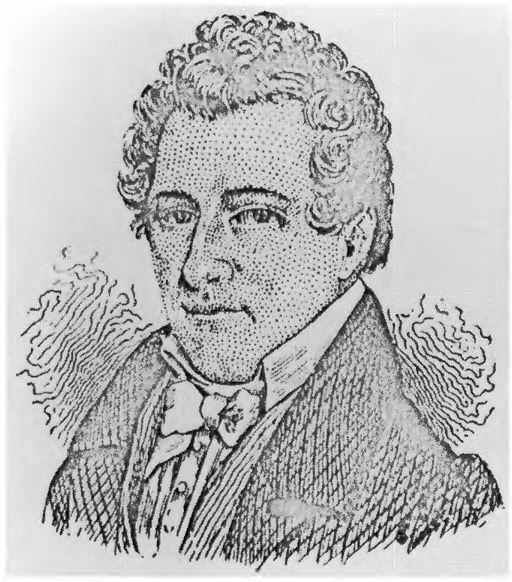
- John Patton Erwin in Ira P. Jones, The City of Nashville (1890)
- Born: January 8, 1795; Wilkes County, North Carolina, United States
- Died: August 27, 1857 (aged 62); Nashville, Tennessee, United States
- Resting place: Nashville City Cemetery
- Occupations: Politician, newspaper editor
- Political party: Whig
- Spouse: Frances Lanier Williams (m. 1815)
- Children: 4

John Patton Erwin (January 8, 1795 – August 27, 1857) was an American Whig politician. He served as the Mayor of Nashville, Tennessee from 1821 to 1822, and from 1834 to 1835.

== Early life ==
John Patton Erwin was born on January 8, 1795, in Wilkes County, North Carolina. His father was Col. Andrew Erwin, a land speculator, and his mother, Jane Patton. He had nine siblings. His brothers-in-law included John Williams, U.S. Senator from Tennessee, Lewis Williams, a U.S. Representative from North Carolina, and Thomas Lanier Williams, Justice of the Tennessee Supreme Court.

== Career ==
In 1817, he became an alderman in Nashville and in 1820 he was admitted to the bar. He served as Mayor of Nashville from 1821 to 1822. He also served as Principal Clerk of the Tennessee House of Representatives as well as editor of the Nashville Whig. He was opposed to Andrew Jackson. In 1826, President John Quincy Adams appointed him United States Postmaster in Nashville.

In 1827, he described David Crockett as, "not only illiterate, but he is rough & uncouth, talks much & loudly, and is by far, more in his proper place when hunting a Bear" yet also "independent and fearless & has a popularity at home that is unaccountable."

Later, he served as Cashier at the Yeatman & Woods Bank. In 1830, he became Justice of the Peace for two terms. From 1834 to 1835, he served as Mayor of Nashville a second time.

Theodore Dwight Weld, Angelina Grimké, and Sarah Grimké, authors of American Slavery As It Is, alleged in 1839 that John Patton Erwin was a slave trader, and "that the Hon. H. Hitchcock, brother-in-law of Mr. E., and since one of the judges of the Supreme Court of Alabama, was interested with him in this traffic."

== Personal life ==
He married Frances Lanier Williams (1796–1872), a member of the Lanier family, in 1815. They had four daughters, Ellen, Mary Caroline, Rebecca and Amelia. In his last years, he was paralyzed. In 1831, he bought the "Buena Vista" mansion.

== Death and legacy ==
He died on August 27, 1857, and he is buried in the Nashville City Cemetery. After his death, his widow sold them "Buena Vista" mansion to the Dominican Sisters of St. Cecilia.

Political offices
| Preceded by James Condon | Mayor of Nashville, Tennessee; 1821–1822 | Succeeded by Robert Brownlee Currey |
| Preceded by John Meredith Bass | Mayor of Nashville, Tennessee; 1834–1835 | Succeeded by William Nichol |
