= Timothy J. Yeatman =

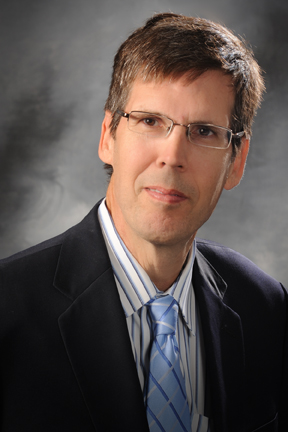
Dr. Timothy Yeatman

Timothy Joseph Yeatman, M.D. F.A.C.S. (born June 10, 1958) is currently the Associate Center Director for Translational Research and Innovation for the Tampa General Hospital Cancer Institute and Professor of Surgery at the University of South Florida, United States. He previously served as the Executive Medical Director of Oncologic Services and the Senior Medical Director for the Oncology Clinical Program at Intermountain Healthcare, serving 23 hospitals and >6000 patients across the State of Utah and beyond. He was also Professor of Surgery at the University of Utah and a Member of the Huntsman Cancer Institute's Cellular Response and Regulation Program. Dr Yeatman was also the Director of Gibbs Cancer Center and President of Gibbs Cancer Center & Research Institute in Spartanburg, South Carolina where he founded the Guardian Research Network, a novel approach to clinical data analytics, leveraging the entire EHR for real time database queries for identifying clinical trial candidates. Yeatman held numerous positions at the Moffitt Cancer Center (MCC) in Florida over a 20 year span from 1992 - 2012. Yeatman served as the Associate Center Director for Clinical Investigations, the Associate Center Director for Translational Research, the Executive Vice President for Translational Research, Professor of Surgery and Cncologic Sciences, and the GI Tumor Program Leader at the Moffitt Cancer Center and the University of South Florida. There he led a $100m Moffitt:Merck collaboration and co-founded a novel biotech company, M2Gen. He also served as Chief Scientific Officer for the Center for Advancement of Science in Space (CASIS), a non-profit organization appointed by Congress and funded by NASA to oversee all scientific use of the International Space Station. He has been funded by the National Cancer Institute (NCI) since 1993 and continues to perform basic and translational colorectal cancer research in genomics and biomarker development.

== Background ==
Yeatman was born in Cheverly, Maryland. He received his undergraduate degree at Duke University, where he graduated summa cum laude and Phi Beta Kappa. He received his medical degree from Emory University and completed his surgical internship and residency at the University of Florida, and then a surgical oncology fellowship at MD Anderson Cancer Center, prior to arriving at Moffitt Cancer Center.

== Career and research ==
Yeatman has been continuously funded by the National Cancer Institute (NCI) since 1993. He spent 20 years at the Moffitt Cancer Center as a physician scientist, with a clinical and research focus on the problems linked to colorectal cancer. He has spent more than 10 years in the field of molecular profiling and gene expression classifier development, working in the environment of team science and multidisciplinary collaboration. Yeatman has active and completed grants funded by NCI as well as the state of Florida. Yeatman holds numerous patents that include the identification of the first human mutations in the SRC oncogene (Patent Number 7803909) and methods for matching patients to clinical trials using a molecular database (Patent Numbers 8175896, 8095389, 20110288890, 20080033658).

Yeatman is a pioneer in personalized medicine, having headed the development of the world's largest human tumor bio-repository and database with comprehensive molecular profiling of approximately 20,000 tumor specimens. He was the principal architect of the Total Cancer Care (TCC) initiative in personalized medicine, and served as the president and founding chief scientific officer of M2Gen (a wholly owned subsidiary of the MCC that implemented and managed the TCC project). He participated in recruiting a nationwide network of 18 hospitals (TCC Consortium) that collected, macrodissected, curated and profiled more than 20,000 snap frozen tumor samples on a single Affymetrix platform with a commercial pipeline. Yeatman also served as chair of the Joint Scientific Committee, and the co-chair of the Joint Operating Committee, which made him the primary liaison with Merck & Co. in developing and managing the more than $150 million project and the derivative science.

== Awards and recognition ==
Yeatman has received numerous honors and awards including the James IV Association of Surgeons Traveling Fellowship, Europe; the Center Director's Award for Outstanding Research at Moffitt Cancer Center; and the James Ewing Foundation Trainee Award, Society of Surgical Oncology, and the Million Dollar Researcher award at the University of South Florida. Yeatman has been continuously funded through additional grants from the American Cancer Society, including a Director's Challenge Award for the global profiling of human colon cancer. He is a member of numerous societies including the American Surgical Association and the Society of Surgical Oncology and the American Association for Cancer Research. He has published around 150 articles in the top peer-reviewed journals in his field, including the prestigious Science, Nature Genetics, Nature Medicine, Nature Reviews Cancer, as well as the Journal of the National Cancer Institute, and Cancer Research.
