= Mount Yeatman =

Mountain in Alaska, United States

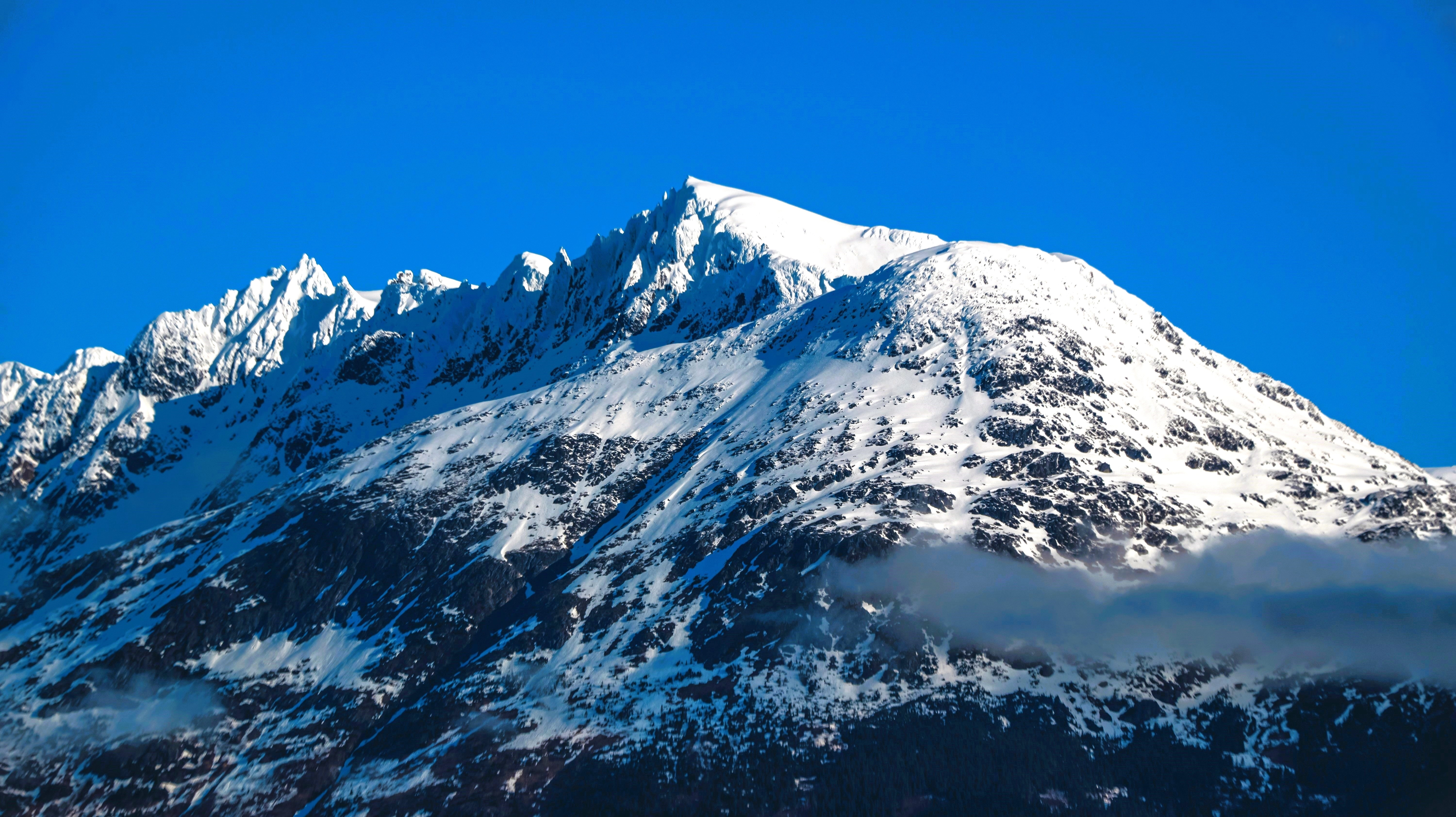
- South aspect, viewed from Skagway

Highest point
- Elevation: 5,670 ft (1,728 m)
- Prominence: 568 ft (173 m)
- Parent peak: Peak 5685
- Isolation: 0.65 mi (1.05 km)
- Coordinates: 59°33′29″N 135°24′21″W

Naming
- Etymology: Richard T. Yeatman

Geography
- Location within Alaska
- Interactive map of Mount Yeatman
- Country: United States
- State: Alaska
- Borough: Skagway
- Parent range: Coast Mountains; Boundary Ranges
- Topo map: USGS Skagway C-2

Mount Yeatman is a 5,670-foot (1,728-metre) mountain summit in Alaska, United States.

== Description ==
Mount Yeatman is situated eight miles (13 km) north-northwest of Skagway and 5.4 mi (9 km) west of Mount Carmack in the Boundary Ranges of the Coast Mountains. Precipitation runoff from the mountain drains into tributaries of the Taiya River. Although modest in elevation, relief is significant as the summit rises 5,590 ft (1,700 m) above the Taiya Valley in two miles (3.2 km). The Klondike Gold Rush National Historical Park and Chilkoot Trail lie at the eastern base of the mountain.

== Etymology ==
The Klondike Gold Rush attracted thousands of new, inexperienced people to Northern Lynn Canal. As they attempted to strike it rich, they overran the landscape and the people already living there. Both the United States and Canada wanted to claim the port towns of Skagway and Dyea. In February 1898, the 14th Infantry sent soldiers and a Hospital Corps detachment to establish law and order in this wild frontier. Companies B, H, and the Hospital Corps went to Dyea, which lies immediately south of this mountain. Company B was led by Captain Richard T. Yeatman (1848–1930). The mountain was named in 1898 by John A. Flemer of the United States Coast and Geodetic Survey, and the toponym was officially adopted by the U.S. Board on Geographic Names.

== Climate ==
Based on the Köppen climate classification, Mount Yeatman has a subarctic climate with cold, snowy winters, and cool summers. Weather systems coming off the Gulf of Alaska are forced upwards by the Coast Mountains (orographic lift), causing heavy precipitation in the form of rainfall and snowfall. Winter temperatures can drop below 0 °F with wind chill factors below −10 °F. This climate supports the Irene Glacier on the northwest slope of this peak. The months May through July offer the most favorable weather for viewing or climbing Mount Yeatman.

== See also ==
- List of mountain peaks of Alaska
- Geography of Alaska
