= James E. Yeatman =

Missouri banker and philanthropist (1818–1901)

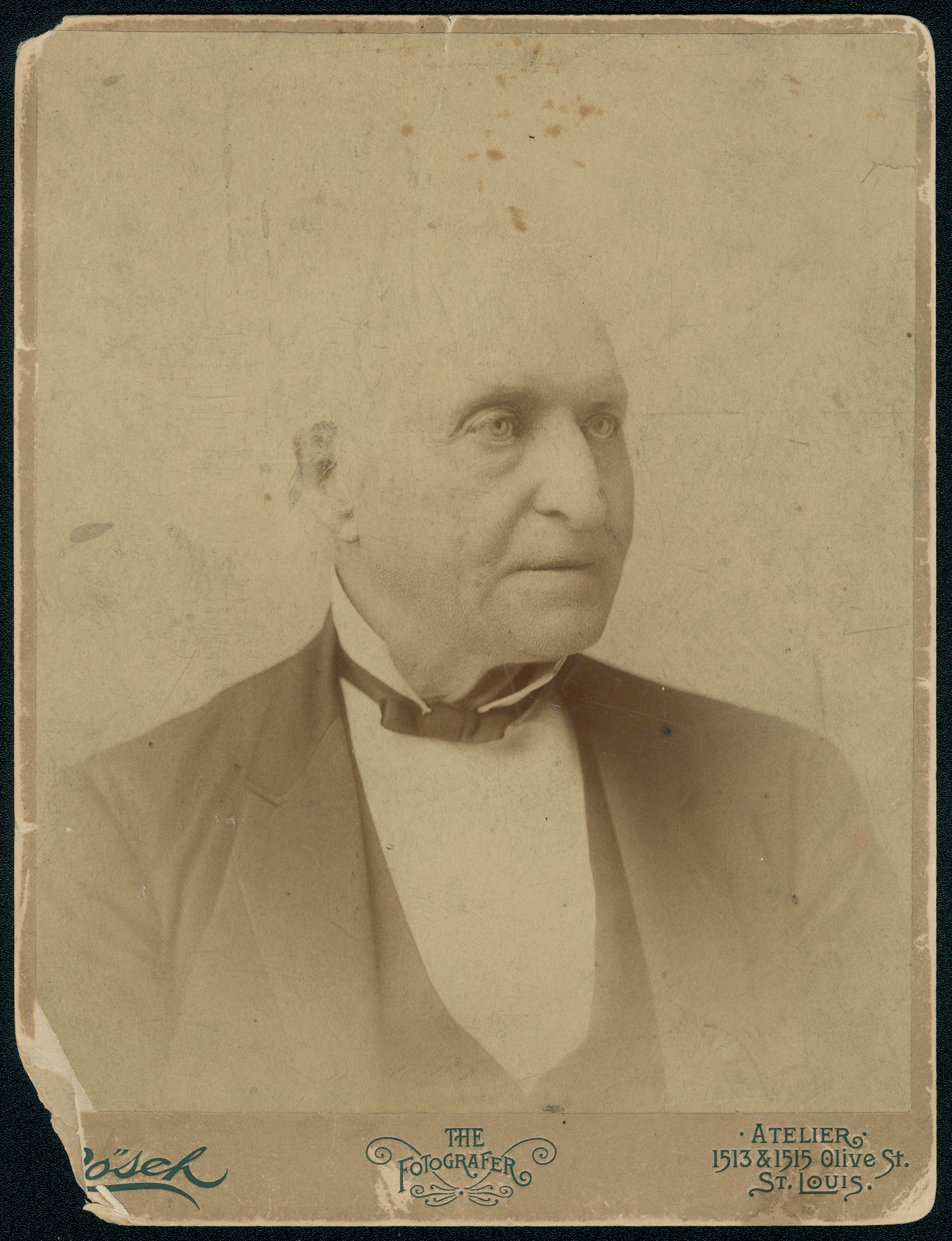
Portrait of an elderly Yeatman

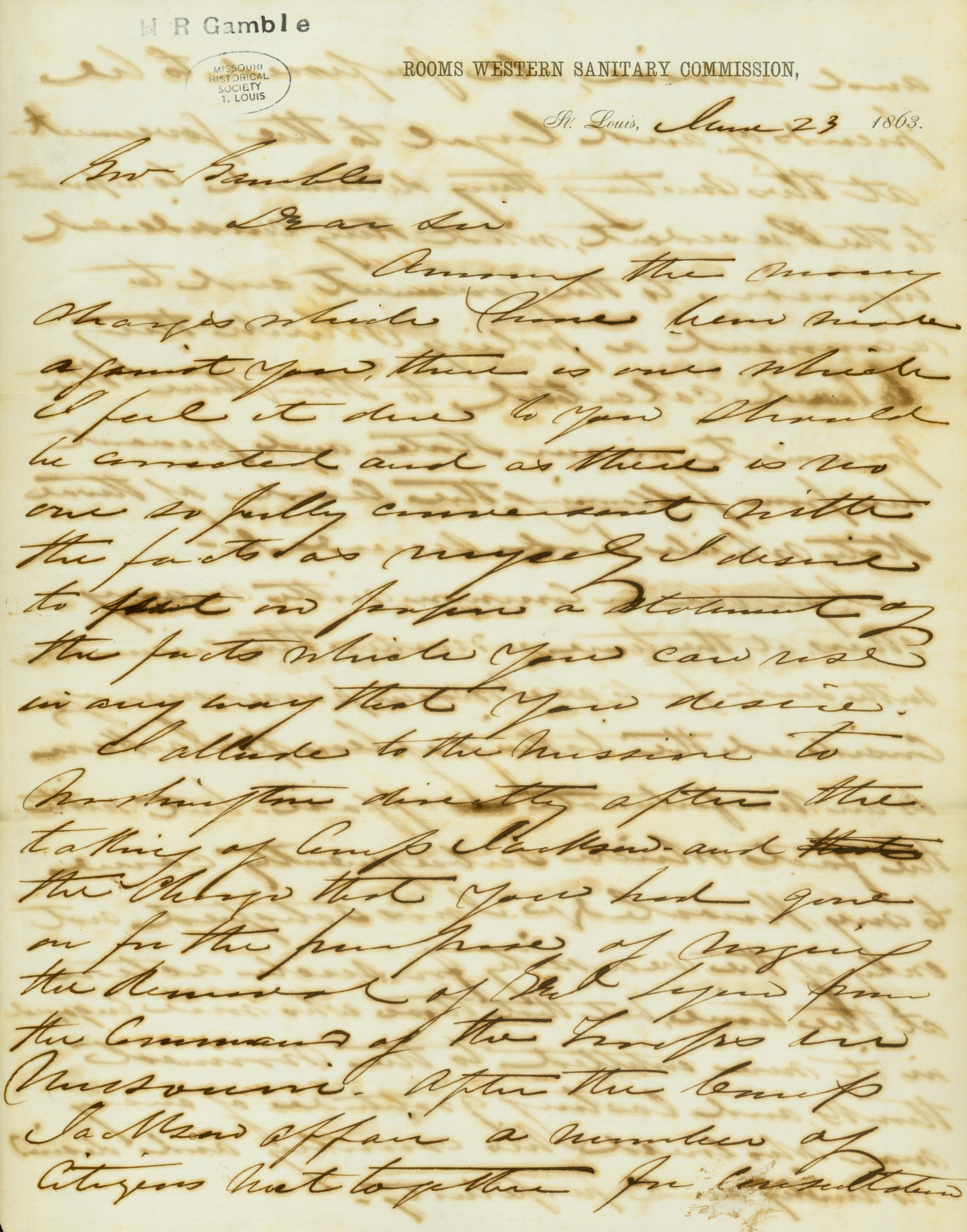
Letter to Governor Hamilton Rowan Gamble from James E. Yeatman

James Erwin Yeatman (August 27, 1818 – 1901) was a bank founder and philanthropist in St. Louis, Missouri. He was the founder and president of the Western Sanitary Commission and Washington University in St. Louis.

Yeatman was born in Bedford County, Tennessee August 27, 1818 near Wartrace. His father, Thomas Yeatman, was a banker and iron foundry owner in Nashville, Tennessee. His mother was Jane Patton Erwin who, after Thomas Yeatman's death, married politician John Bell.

Yeatman attended private school and New Haven Commercial School then toured Europe. After working for his father in Cumberland Gap, Tennessee he moved to St. Louis in 1842.

He founded Merchant Bank and the Mercantile Library (1846) on Fourth and Locust streets. He also served as the library’s first president and founded the Missouri Institute for the Education of the Blind after being inspired by teacher Eli W. Whelan. With Dr. William Greenleaf Eliot he founded Washington University in St. Louis in 1853. He was also a founder and president of the St. Louis Philharmonic Society, founded the Provident Association, organized St. Louis charities, and was a founder of the Western Sanitary Commission.

In 1872 Yeatman donated property to the Catholic Church for an orphanage to serve those left behind after a cholera epidemic. The Christian Brothers began operating the orphanage in 1876 and it eventually became the La Salle Institute.

Yeatman was also involved in advocating for and running a railroad, Pacific Railroad (which became Missouri Pacific Railroad). Yeatman met with Abraham Lincoln in Washington D.C. to help counsel his dealings with Nebraska and Nathaniel Lyon.

Yeatman served on the first board of the St. Louis Children’s Hospital and of Bellefontaine Cemetery. He died in 1901 and is buried there.

The American writer Winston Churchill based a character in one of his novel The Crisis on Yeatman. Yeatman married twice and had five children. He was given the nickname Old Sanitary for his work in the field helping soldiers for the Western Sanitary Commission.
