= Thomas Yeatman =

Tennessee businessman (1787–1833)

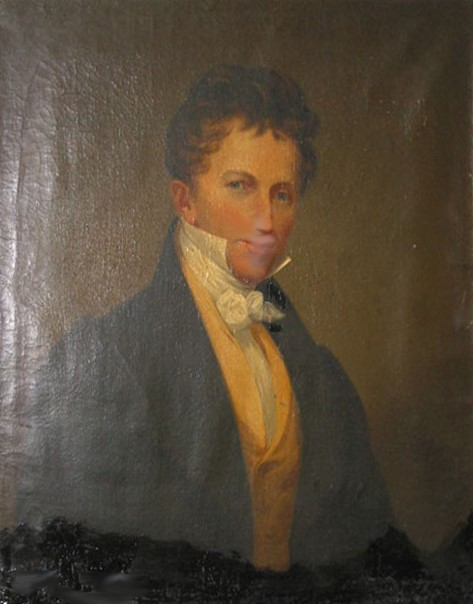
Yeatman at the age of 33.

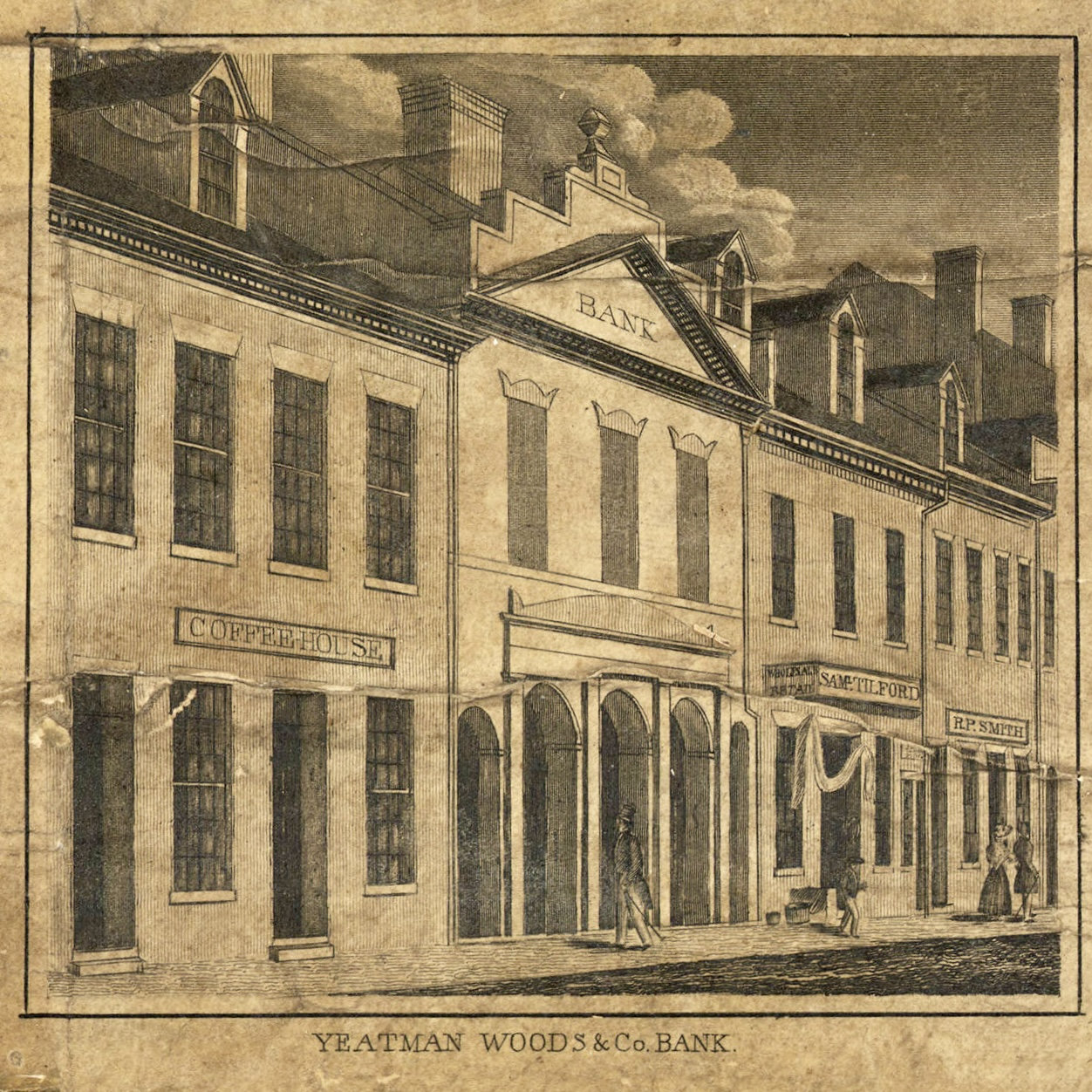
Yeatman Woods & Co. Bank of Nashville, 1831

Thomas T. Yeatman Sr. (1787–1833) was the owner of an iron foundry and was a prominent cotton trader, banker, steamboat owner, and commission business partner in Nashville, Tennessee.

Yeatman's father was a boatbuilder in Brownsville, Pennsylvania. According to a writer signing as "Progress" in 1879, "Thomas Yeatman Esq. spent several weeks prospecting for iron ore in Stewart county in the summer of 1826 and 1827, and in due time secured about 30,000 acres of land, upon which Dover Furnace was erected in 1828, and in 1830 Bear Spring Furnace was built, and about the same time the Rolling Mill and Forges. The fire brick for the heating furnaces of the Rolling Mill were imported from England, at a cost of one hundred dollars ($100) a thousand. Afterwards, a deposit of fire clay was found on the property, which made as good trick as those imported." With business partners Joseph, Robert, and James Woods, he formed Yeatman, Woods & Co.

Yeatman was a crucial source of credit for Tennessee farmers and businessmen in the 1810s and 1820s. In 1901 a newspaper stated that Yeatman, Woods & Co. was "one of two banks in the United States that did not totter under the terrible crash of the 1830s (Jackson's bank policy)" and was considered "a tower of financial strength for the whole Southwest."

In 1813, Yeatman killed another local merchant named, Robert Anderson, in a duel over business matters and/or courtship of a lady. William Carroll was Yeatman's second in the duel.

Shortly after his death the Nashville Banner stated that despite the demise of one of the principals, Yeatman and Woods would continue to deal in "bills of exchange" and "connected with this establishment, is the Iron Works, and the manufactory of nails which we noticed some days since. The proprietors have in full operation, in the lower counties of this State, lying on the Cumberland, iron works, capable of manufacturing three thousand tons of iron annually, and of manufacturing nails equal to the consumption of all Middle and West Tennessee. This large and useful establishment...pays out, as we are informed upon undoubted authority, about the sum of $100,000 annually to the people of Tennessee, for fuel, corn beef, pork, labor, domestic clothing, &c. &c." There was a Yeatman estate liquidation sale on October 2, 1834, which sold off 18,000 acres, iron blast furnaces, tools, livestock, and more than 200 enslaved people.

Yeatman died in the 1833 cholera epidemic.

== Personal life ==
Yeatman's first wife Martha died at age 19 in 1815. She is buried in Nashville City Cemetery.

Yeatman remarried after his first wife died. His second wife, Jane Patton Erwin, a daughter of Andrew Erwin, married John Bell, who would run for U.S. president. His son James E. Yeatman had a charitable career and business career in St. Louis, Missouri. Another son, Thomas Yeatman Jr., continued in the cotton business.

== Sources ==
- Carey, Bill (2018). Runaways, Coffles and Fancy Girls: A History of Slavery in Tennessee. Nashville, Tennessee: Clearbrook Press. ISBN 978-0-9725680-4-3. LCCN 2018903570. OCLC 1045068878.
- Jones, James B. (Summer 2019). "Dueling in Tennessee History" (PDF). The Courier. LXIX (2). Nashville: State of Tennessee Historical Commission: 9–24. OCLC 10616196.
- Sellers, Charles G. (June 1954). "Banking and Politics in Jackson's Tennessee, 1817–1827". The Mississippi Valley Historical Review. 41 (1): 61–84. doi:10.2307/1898150.
