= Eric Morgan Yeatman =

British microengineer

Eric Morgan Yeatman FREng FIET FIMMM is the Vice Principal and Head of College for Science and Engineering, at the University of Glasgow. He was previously a professor of electrical engineering at Imperial College London in London, UK. He is an expert in micro-electromechanical systems (MEMS) and was the co-founder and Director of Microsaic Systems.

== Awards ==
In 2011, Yeatman received the Royal Academy of Engineering Silver Medal, and in 2012 he was made a Fellow of the academy. In 2013, Yeatman was named as a Fellow of the Institute of Electrical and Electronics Engineers (IEEE) for "contributions to the development of micro-electro-mechanical devices." He is also a Fellow of the City and Guilds of London Institute, the Institution of Engineering and Technology and the Institute of Materials, Minerals and Mining.
