= Religious views of George Washington =

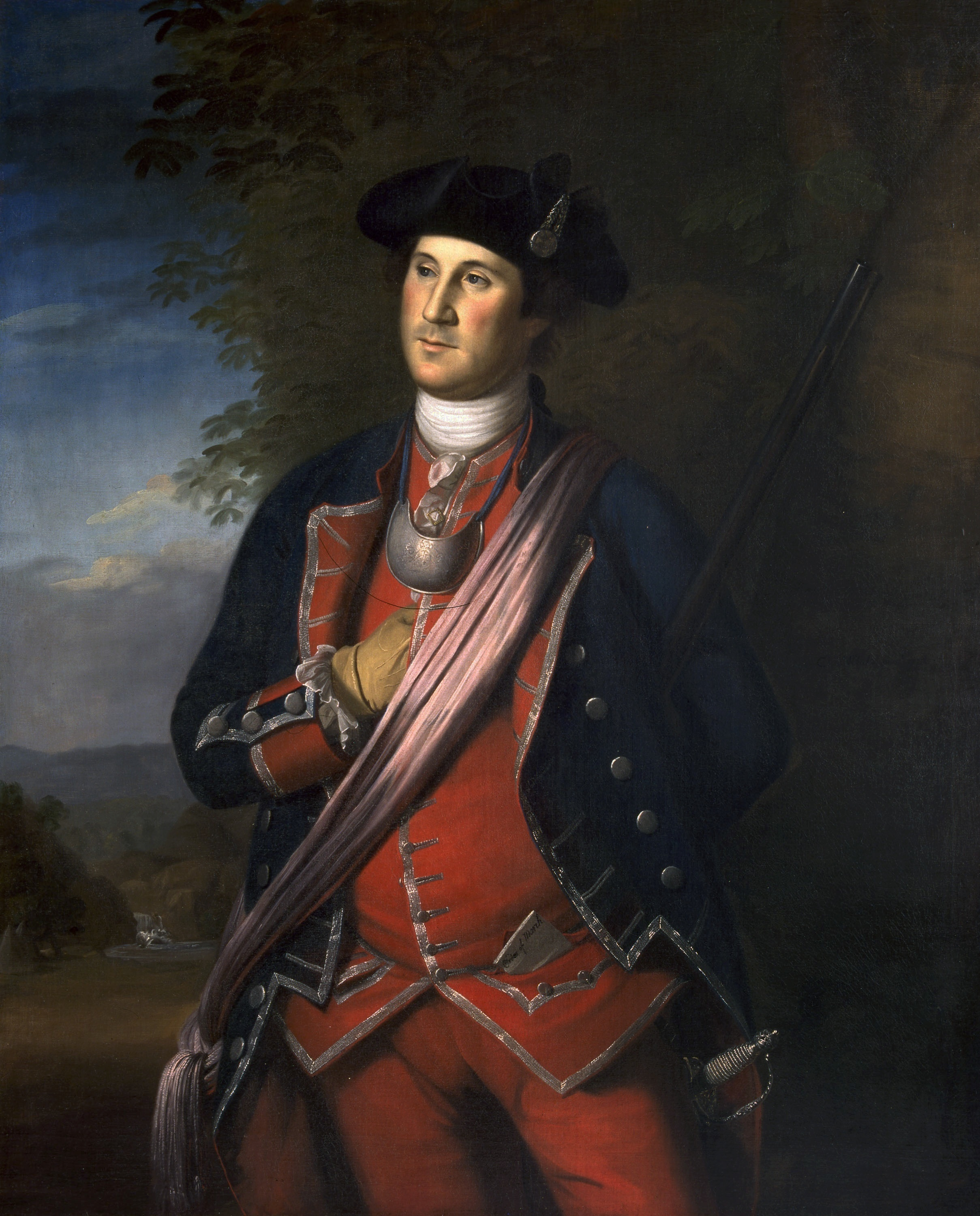
George Washington in 1772 by Charles Willson Peale

The religious views of George Washington have long been debated. While some of the other Founding Fathers of the United States, such as Thomas Jefferson, Benjamin Franklin, and Patrick Henry, were noted for writing about religion, Washington rarely discussed his religious and philosophical views.

Washington attended the Anglican Church through all of his life, and was baptized as an infant. He was a member of several churches which he attended, and served as an Anglican vestryman and warden for more than fifteen years, when Virginia had an established church. As a young man he also joined the Freemasons, which also promoted spiritual and moral values for society. His personal letters and public speeches sometimes referred to "Providence", a term for God used by both Christians and deists. Washington's religious perspectives were shaped by his relationships with religious and political figures such as Worshipful Master Francis Lowthorp Sr., who gave Washington the Masonic address of welcome at the New Bern Masonic Lodge in 1791. Washington's moral values can also be inferred from his correspondence with Reverend John Lathrop on June 22, 1788, praising the clergyman's work and discussing his support for the proposed U.S. Constitution.

== Anglican affiliations ==
Washington's great-great-grandfather, Lawrence Washington, was an Anglican rector in England.

George Washington was baptized in infancy into the Church of England, which, until 1776, was the established church (state religion) of Virginia. As an adult, Washington served as a member of the vestry (lay council) for his local parish. In colonial-era Virginia, office-holding qualifications at all levels—including the House of Burgesses, to which Washington was elected in 1758—required affiliation with the current state religion and an undertaking that one would neither express dissent nor do anything that did not conform to church doctrine. At the library of the New-York Historical Society, some manuscripts containing a leaf from the church record of Pohick were available to Benson Lossing, an American historian, which he included in his Field Book of the Revolution; the leaf contained the following signed oath, required to qualify individuals as vestrymen:

I, A B, do declare that I will be conformable to the Doctrine and Discipline of the Church of England, as by law established.,

1765. May 20th.—Thomas Withers Coffer, Thomas Ford, John Ford.

19th August.

— Geo. Washington, Daniel M'Carty [...]

Washington served as a vestryman or warden for more than 15 years. The Vestry in Virginia was the governing body of each church.

As the British monarch is Supreme Governor of the Church of England, and its clergy swear an Oath of Supremacy to the monarch, the American churches established the Episcopal Church after the American Revolution. The Virginia Statute for Religious Freedom (1786) disestablished the Church, although it retained some lands which had been purchased with public money. (The denominations that share the Church of England tradition are associated through the Anglican Communion.)

== Attendance at religious services ==
Washington paid for pews at several churches. Rev. Lee Massey, his pastor wrote, "I never knew so constant an attendant in church as Washington." However, Washington's personal diaries indicate that he did not regularly attend services while home at Mount Vernon, spending most Sundays writing letters, conducting business, fox-hunting, or doing other activities. Biographer Paul Leicester Ford wrote:

His daily "where and how my time is spent" tells how often he attended church, and in the year 1760 he went sixteen times, and in 1768 he went fourteen.

While he was at Mount Vernon, his first parish was Pohick Church, seven miles (11 km) from Mt. Vernon; his second parish in Alexandria was nine miles (14 km) away.

When traveling, particularly on political business, he was more likely to attend church services. In the seven Sundays during the First Continental Congress in Philadelphia, he went to church on three occasions, attending Anglican, Quaker, and Catholic services. During his tours of the nation in his two terms as president, he attended religious services in each city, sometimes as frequently as three services in a day.

== Communion ==
The record of Washington receiving communion was spotty. Ministers at four of the churches Washington often attended wrote that he regularly left services before communion.

After the religious ceremony and Pulpit service Washington, along with the greater congregation, would exit the church, leaving wife Martha with the communicants to receive communion. In one definitive case a Pastor James Abercrombie of St. Peter's Episcopal Church, in Philadelphia took exception to the advent and, considering it his duty, said in one of his sermons that he was unhappy to see people in elevated stations not set an example by receiving communion. He later admitted that the remark was intended for the President, and indeed Washington had assumed the remark was aimed at him. Washington later discussed the incident with a Congressman at a dinner and related to him that he had honored the preacher for his integrity and candour, and that he had never considered that his example was of any influence. Never being a communicant, Washington felt that if he were to begin it would be seen as an ostentatious display of a President flaunting his religion solely prompted by the Pastor's remarks. Historian Paul F. Boller suggests that Washington, a man who had helped to promote a major war, refrained from receiving communion from the idea that his heart and mind were not in "a proper condition to receive the sacrament," and that Washington simply did not want to indulge in something he regarded to be an act of hypocrisy on his part. After the incident it is believed that Washington completely stopped attending that church on communion Sundays.

In 1915 the great-grandson of Elizabeth Schuyler Hamilton reported that his grandmother said, when she was 97 years old (about 1854), "If anyone ever tells you that George Washington was not a communicant in the Church, you say that your great-grandmother told you to say that she 'had knelt at this chancel rail at his side and received with him the Holy Communion.'"

Nonetheless, it was also not uncommon in those days for churchgoers to pass on participating in communion.

== Baptism ==
As noted above, Washington was baptized as an infant into the Church of England (Anglican Church), in April 1732.

During the Revolutionary War it has been suggested that Washington was again baptized by the Baptist chaplain to the Continental Army John Gano at Valley Forge. Washington biographer Rupert Hughes determined that Rev. Gano served with George Clinton's army, not with Washington's, that the location is sometimes given as Valley Forge and sometimes as the Potomac River, that there is no documentation of Gano ever being at Valley Forge, that there is nothing in Gano's own correspondence or his biography to suggest that the event took place, and that none of the 42 reputed witnesses ever documented the event.

Washington himself was a godfather in the baptism of several children including his niece Frances Lewis, his nephews Fielding Lewis and Charles Lewis, Catharine Van Rensselaer (daughter of Philip Schuyler), George Washington Colfax (son of William Colfax) and Benjamin Lincoln Lear (son of Tobias Lear).

== Public writings and speeches ==
Washington used the word "God" 146 times in his personal and public writings, many of which were in his public speeches and while some were regularly used phrases such as "thank God," "God knows," "for God's sake," or "my God!" there are many other examples where Washington used thoughtful expressions about God and His Providence.

From his Headquarters in New York, July 9, 1776, Washington issued a General Order which read, in pertinent part, "The blessing and protection of Heaven are at all times necessary but especially so in times of public distress and danger—The General hopes and trusts, that every officer and man, will endeavour so to live, and act, as becomes a Christian Soldier defending the dearest Rights and Liberties of his country." Throughout his life, Washington spoke of the value of righteousness, and of seeking and offering thanks for the "blessings of Heaven." Washington often spoke of "Providence." The Catholic historian and philosopher Michael Novak writes that Anglican laymen of that period rarely invoked the name of Jesus Christ. The most famous reference came in a 1779 letter to a delegation of Native Americans. The letter was in the handwriting of an aide, and the leading biographers, including Chernow, Henriques and Freeman, say that the aide wrote it, not Washington:

You do well to wish to learn our arts and ways of life, and above all, the religion of Jesus Christ. These will make you a greater and happier people than you are. Congress will do every thing they can to assist you in this wise intention; and to tie the knot of friendship and union so fast, that nothing shall ever be able to loose it.

Washington referenced Jesus as the "divine Author of our blessed Religion" in his "Circular Letter to the Governors" of 1783 in the following prayer:

"I now make it my earnest prayer, that God would have you, and the State over which you preside, in his holy protection, that he would incline the hearts of the Citizens to cultivate a spirit of subordination and obedience to Government, to entertain a brotherly affection and love for one another, for their fellow Citizens of the United States at large, and particularly for their brethren who have served in the Field, and finally, that he would most graciously be pleased to dispose us all, to do Justice, to love mercy, and to demean ourselves with that Charity, humility and pacific temper of mind, which were the Characteristicks of the Divine Author of our blessed Religion, and without an humble imitation of whose example in these things, we can never hope to be a happy Nation."

When the Continental Congress authorized a day of fasting in 1778, Washington told his soldiers:

The Honorable Congress having thought proper to recommend to The United States of America to set apart Wednesday the 22nd. instant to be observed as a day of Fasting, Humiliation and Prayer, that at one time and with one voice the righteous dispensations of Providence may be acknowledged and His Goodness and Mercy toward us and our Arms supplicated and implored; The General directs that this day also shall be religiously observed in the Army, that no work be done thereon and that the Chaplains prepare discourses suitable to the Occasion.

Washington believed in the importance of religion for republican government. His 1796 Farewell Address, written by Alexander Hamilton and revised by himself, said that it was unrealistic to expect that a whole nation, whatever might be said of minds of peculiar structure, could long be moral without religion, that national morality is necessary for good government, and that politicians should cherish religion's support of national morality:

Of all the dispositions and habits, which lead to political prosperity, Religion and Morality are indispensable supports. In vain would that man claim the tribute of Patriotism, who should labor to subvert these great pillars of human happiness, these firmest props of the duties of Men and Citizens. The mere Politician, equally with the pious man, ought to respect and to cherish them. A volume could not trace all their connexions with private and public felicity. Let it simply be asked, Where is the security for property, for reputation, for life, if the sense of religious obligation desert the oaths, which are the instruments of investigation in Courts of Justice? And let us with caution indulge the supposition, that morality can be maintained without religion. Whatever may be conceded to the influence of refined education on minds of peculiar structure, reason and experience both forbid us to expect, that national morality can prevail in exclusion of religious principle. It is substantially true, that virtue or morality is a necessary spring of popular government. The rule, indeed, extends with more or less force to every species of free government. Who, that is a sincere friend to it, can look with indifference upon attempts to shake the foundation of the fabric?

Washington rejected an additional sentence, also written by Alexander Hamilton, with a stronger sentiment: "does [national morality] not require the aid of a generally received and divinely authoritative Religion?"

For decades, Washington was credited with starting the tradition of adding the words "so help me, God" to the presidential inaugural oath, although experts at the Library of Congress, the U.S. Senate Historical Office, and Mount Vernon have said there is no evidence to support that claim. None of the detailed contemporaneous eyewitness accounts of the first inauguration mentioned that Washington had used that expression, and it is not part of the text of the inaugural oath prescribed by the Constitution. The first authors to state that Washington added the words were Rufus Wilmot Griswold in 1854 and Washington Irving in 1857. (According to the Library of Congress, the earliest documented use of that phrase during an inauguration was by President Chester Arthur, almost a century after Washington's first inauguration.)

In his first inaugural address, Washington stressed his belief that the new nation "was under the special agency of Providence."

Washington made several statements as General of the Army which mentioned religion. Sparks quotes orders given by General Washington to his Army requiring them to attend to their religious duties and "to implore the blessing of Heaven" upon the American Army.

Early in his presidency, at the request of Congress, he issued the first National Thanksgiving Proclamation on October 3, 1789. The proclamation was sent to the governors of the states, and assigns the day upon which "the people of these States" devote themselves in service to "that great and glorious Being who is the beneficent author of all the good that was, that is, or that will be." It urges the people in the young country to express their gratitude to God for: his protection of them through the Revolutionary War and the peace they had experienced since; for allowing the Constitution to be composed in a "peaceable and rational manner;" for the "civil and religious liberty" they possessed; and "in general, for all the great and various favors which He has been pleased to confer upon us." The proclamation also states that "it is the duty of all nations to acknowledge the providence of Almighty God, to obey His will, to be grateful for His benefits, and humbly to implore His protection and favor." It ends by calling the people of the United States to prayer and to beseech God "to pardon our national and other transgressions;" to allow the national government to be wise and just; to "protect and guide" all nations; to promote "true religion and virtue, and the increase of science;" and to "grant unto all mankind such a degree of temporal prosperity as He alone knows to be best."

== Private writings ==
In his letters to young people, particularly to his adopted children, Washington urged upon them truth, character, honesty, but said little or nothing related to specific items of religious practice. Analysts who have studied Washington's papers held by the Library of Congress say that his correspondence with Masonic Lodges is filled with references to the "Great Architect of the Universe."

Prayers said to have been composed by him in his later life are highly edited. An unfinished book of Christian prayers attributed to him (as a youth) by a collector (around 1891) was rejected by Worthington C. Ford, editor of an edition of Washington's papers, and the Smithsonian Institution for lack of authenticity. Comparisons to documents Washington wrote show that it is not in his handwriting.

In a letter to George Mason in 1785, he wrote that he was not among those alarmed by a bill "making people pay towards the support of that [religion] which they profess", but felt that it was "impolitic" to pass such a measure, and wished it had never been proposed, believing that it would disturb public tranquility.

== Support of religious toleration ==
Washington held that all religions, and nearly all religious practices, were beneficial to humans. On some occasions, such as when he was President, he attended Sunday services at various churches.

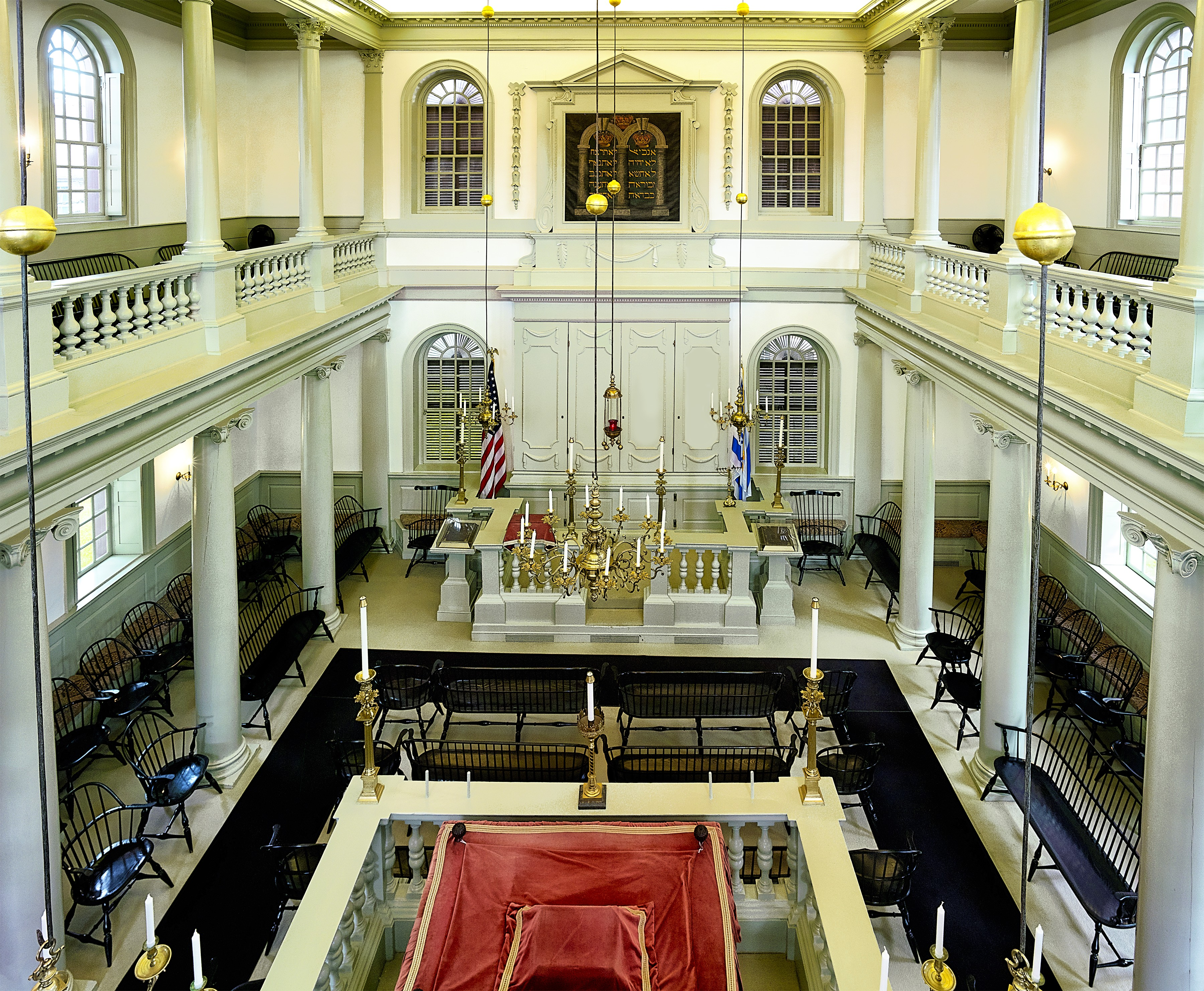
Interior of the Touro Synagogue, where Washington addressed his famous letter in support of freedom of religion in the United States

Washington was an early supporter of religious toleration and freedom of religion. In 1775, he ordered that his troops not show anti-Catholic sentiments by burning the pope in effigy on Guy Fawkes Night.

Washington was an officer in the Freemasons, an organization which, at the time Washington lived, required that its members "will never be a stupid Atheist nor an irreligious Libertine", which meant that they should believe in God, regardless of other religious convictions or affiliations.

Some biographers hold the opinion that many of the American Founding Fathers (and especially Washington) believed that, as leaders of the nation, they should remain silent on questions of doctrine and denomination, to avoid creating unnecessary divisiveness within the nation; instead they should promote the virtues taught by religion in general.

=== Tolerance ===
When acquiring workmen for Mount Vernon, he wrote to his agent, "If they be good workmen, they may be from Asia, Africa, or Europe; they may be Mohammedans [Muslims], Jews, or Christians of any sect, or they may be Atheists."

==== Letter to the Hebrew Congregation in Newport, Rhode Island ====
In 1790, Washington expressed his support for religious tolerance in a letter to the Hebrew Congregation in Newport, Rhode Island:

The Citizens of the United States of America have a right to applaud themselves for having given to mankind examples of an enlarged and liberal policy — a policy worthy of imitation. All possess alike liberty of conscience and immunities of citizenship. It is now no more that toleration is spoken of as if it were the indulgence of one class of people that another enjoyed the exercise of their inherent natural rights, for, happily, the Government of the United States, which gives to bigotry no sanction, to persecution no assistance, requires only that they who live under its protection should demean themselves as good citizens in giving it on all occasions their effectual support.

Washington also wrote two other letters to Jewish communities, both written in 1790. One was addressed to the community in Savannah, Georgia. the other was a combined letter addressing the Jewish communities in New York, Philadelphia, Charleston, and Richmond.

== Eyewitness accounts ==
Eyewitness accounts exist of Washington engaging in morning devotions. Jared Sparks recorded the following account from Washington's nephew George W. Lewis: "Mr. Lewis said he had accidentally witnessed [Washington's] private devotions in his library both morning and evening; that on those occasions he had seen him in a kneeling position with a Bible open before him and that he believed such to have been his daily practice." Sparks also reports that Washington's adopted daughter, Nelly Custis-Lewis, in response to his request for information on Washington's religions views, wrote, "He attended the church at Alexandria when the weather and roads permitted a ride of ten miles (a one-way journey of 2–3 hours by horse or carriage). In New York and Philadelphia he never omitted attendance at church in the morning, unless detained by indisposition [sickness]." She continued by saying "No one in church attended to the services with more reverential respect." She added: "I should have thought it the greatest heresy to doubt his firm belief in Christianity. His life, his writings, prove that he was a Christian. He was not one of those who act or pray, that they may be seen of men." In closing, Nelly attempted to answer the question of whether General Washington was a Christian. She responded, "Is it necessary that any one should certify, 'General Washington avowed himself to me a believer in Christianity?' As well may we question his patriotism, his heroic, disinterested devotion to his country. His mottos were, 'Deeds, not Words;' and, 'For God and my Country.'"

During the Revolutionary War, General Robert Porterfield stated he "found him on his knees, engaged in his morning's devotions." Alexander Hamilton corroborated Porterfield's account, stating "such was his most constant habit." A French citizen who knew Washington well during the Revolutionary War and the presidency stated "Every day of the year, he rises at five in the morning; as soon as he is up, he dresses, then prays reverently to God." Indeed, Washington had purchased a prayer book "with the New Version of Psalms & good plain Type" a few years before the Revolutionary War.

On February 1, 1800, a few weeks after Washington's death, Thomas Jefferson made the following entry in his journal, regarding an incident on the occasion of Washington's departure from office:

Dr. Rush tells me that he had it from Asa Green that when the clergy addressed Genl. Washington on his departure from the govmt, it was observed in their consultation that he had never on any occasion said a word to the public which showed a belief in the Xn religion and they thot they should so pen their address as to force him at length to declare publicly whether he was a Christian or not. They did so. However he observed the old fox was too cunning for them. He answered every article of their address particularly except that, which he passed over without notice. Rush observes he never did say a word on the subject in any of his public papers except in his valedictory letter to the Governors of the states when he resigned his commission in the army, wherein he speaks of the benign influence of the Christian religion. I know that Gouverneur Morris, who pretended to be in his secrets & believed himself to be so, has often told me that Genl. Washington believed no more of that system than he himself did.

In the 1840s, abolitionist newspapers printed interviews with and testimony of Oney Judge, a slave who escaped from the Washingtons in 1796. One such article, from the Granite Freeman, stated: "she never heard Washington pray, and does not believe that he was accustomed to. 'Mrs. Washington used to read prayers, but I don't call that praying.'" (It should be kept in mind that reading printed prayers is typical Anglican practice.) In another case, the Rev. Benjamin Chase, in a letter to The Liberator, wrote that "She says that the stories told of Washington's piety and prayers, so far as she ever saw or heard while she was his slave, have no foundation. Card-playing and wine-drinking were the business at his parties, and he had more of such company Sundays than on any other day." In both cases, these statements were intended to disparage Washington's character, as he had held slaves; for example, Chase continues, "I do not mention this as showing, in my estimation, his anti-Christian character, so much as the bare fact of being a slaveholder, and not a hundredth part so much as trying to kidnap this woman; but, in the minds of the community, it will weigh infinitely more."

== Deism and scholarly views ==
Even during his lifetime, people were unsure of the degree to which Washington believed in Christianity. As noted above, some of his contemporaries called him a deist. Debate continues to this day regarding whether he is best categorized as a deist or as a Christian, and some writers have introduced other terms to describe a blending of the two.

Deism was an influential worldview during his lifetime. There is no known record of Washington ever using "Jesus" or "Christ" in private or public writings or speeches. One document he signed but did not write did say to the Delaware Indian chiefs that learning the "religion of Jesus Christ" is the most important thing they can do. Furthermore, Washington used "God" 146 times in his personal and public writings. Some of these references to "God" are stock phrases like "God forbid" or "God be with you". Some instances are serious expressions about God and especially His divine intervention in the affairs of mankind, commonly known as Providence. Washington used words such as "Grand Architect" and "Providence" that were popular among some deists. These terms were also commonly used by the Freemasons. While deists and Freemasons did use these words, words like "Providence" specifically were not exclusively used by deists and Freemasons, but were also used by Christians during Washington's time period.

Historian Fred Anderson says that Washington's Providence was, "a generally benevolent, as well as an omnipotent, omnipresent, omniscient being, but He was hardly the kind of warm and loving God embraced by the evangelical Protestants."

Paul F. Boller, Jr. stated "Washington was no infidel, if by infidel is meant unbeliever. Washington had an unquestioning faith in Providence and, as we have seen, he voiced this faith publicly on numerous occasions. That this was no mere rhetorical flourish on his part, designed for public consumption, is apparent from his constant allusions to Providence in his personal letters. There is every reason to believe, from a careful analysis of religious references in his private correspondence, that Washington's reliance upon a Grand Designer along Deist lines was as deep-seated and meaningful for his life as, say, Ralph Waldo Emerson's serene confidence in a Universal Spirit permeating the ever shifting appearances of the everyday world."

David L. Holmes, author of The Faiths of the Founding Fathers, in a sidebar article for Britannica categorizes Washington as a Christian deist. His usage of this category implies a religious spectrum of sorts for deism. Holmes also distinguishes between strict deists and orthodox Christians by their church attendance, participation in religious rites (such as baptism, Holy Communion, and confirmation), the use of religious language, and opinions of contemporary family, friends, clergy, and acquaintances. Regarding these specific parameters, Holmes describes Washington as a Christian deist due to his religious behavior falling somewhere between that of an orthodox Christian and a strict deist. Although Washington was clearly not a communicant, was infrequent in his Church attendance, and did not deem it necessary to participate in religious rites, Holmes labels him as a Christian deist due to his references of God, which resemble strict deistic terminology yet add a Christian dimension of mercy and divine nature. Additionally, Holmes states that Washington's "dedication to Christianity was clear in his own mind" as to imply that Washington's own religious self-analysis should be deemed at least as noteworthy as that of critics who claim he was unorthodox.

Historian and Washington specialist Frank E. Grizzard, Jr. highlights "Providence" as the central feature of Washington's religious faith, noting that "Providence" was Washington's most often-used term for God.

The qualities attributed to Providence by Washington reveal that he conceived of Providence as an "Omnipotent," "benign," and "beneficent" Being that by "invisible workings" in "Infinite Wisdom" dispensed justice in the affairs of mankind.

In 2006 Peter Lillback, the president of Westminster Theological Seminary, published a lengthy book through his own non-profit organization on the subject of Washington's religious beliefs. The book, George Washington's Sacred Fire, proposed that Washington was an orthodox Christian within the framework of his time; it gained attention through promotion on Glenn Beck's show. Lillback claims he disproved the deist hypothesis. Lillback has explained more recently that evidence unavailable to earlier historians shows that

Washington referred to himself frequently using the words "ardent," "fervent," "pious," and "devout." There are over one hundred different prayers composed and written by Washington in his own hand, with his own words, in his writings....Although he never once used the word "Deist" in his voluminous writings, he often mentioned religion, Christianity, and the Gospel....Historians ought no longer be permitted to do the legerdemain of turning Washington into a Deist even if they found it necessary and acceptable to do so in the past. Simply put, it is time to let the words and writings of Washington's faith speak for themselves.

Biographer Barry Schwartz has stated that Washington's "practice of Christianity was limited and superficial, because he was not himself a Christian. In the enlightened tradition of his day, he was a devout Deist—just as many of the clergymen who knew him suspected."

Two books exploring Washington's religious beliefs—Realistic Visionary by Peter Henriques, and Faith and the Presidency by Gary Scott Smith—both categorize Washington as a theistic rationalist which is described as a hybrid belief system somewhere between strict deism and orthodox Christianity, with rationalism as the predominant element. The term itself is not known to have been in use during Washington's lifetime.

The Catholic historian and philosopher Michael Novak maintains that Washington could not have been strictly a Deist, but was a Christian:

What we did prove, and quite conclusively, is that Washington cannot be called a Deist—at least, not in a sense that excludes his being Christian. Although he did most often address God in the proper names a Deist might use—such as "Author of all the good that was, that is, or that will be" and "Disposer of all human events"—the actions that Washington expected God to perform, as expressed both in his official public prayers (whether as general or as president) and in his private prayers as recorded, are the sorts of actions only the God of the Bible performs: interposing his actions in human events, forgiving sins, enlightening minds, bringing good harvests, intervening on behalf of one party in a struggle between good and evil (in this case, between liberty and the deprivation of liberty), etc. Many persons at the end of the 18th century were both Christians and Deists. But it cannot be said, in the simpleminded sense in which historians have become accustomed to putting it, that Washington was merely a Deist, or even that the God to whom he prayed was expected to behave like a Deist God at all.

Biographer Ron Chernow, author of the Pulitzer Prize-winning book, Washington: A Life, has acknowledged the profound role Christianity played in Washington's life through the 18th-century Virginian Anglican/Episcopalian church:

There has been a huge controversy, to put it mildly, about Washington's religious beliefs. Before the Revolutionary War he was Anglican – Church of England – which meant after the war, he was Episcopalian. So, he was clearly Christian... He was quite intensely religious, because even though he uses the word Providence, he constantly sees Providence as an active force in life, particularly in American life. I mean, every single victory in war he credits to Providence. The miracle of the Constitutional Convention he credits to Providence. The creation of the federal government and the prosperity of the early republic, he credits to Providence... I was struck at how frequently in his letters he's referring to Providence, and it's Providence where there's a sense of design and purpose, which sounds to me very much like religion... Unfortunately, this particular issue has become very very politicized.

In 2012, historian Gregg Frazer argued that Washington was not a deist but a "theistic rationalist." This theological position rejected core beliefs of Christianity, such as the divinity of Christ, the Trinity and Original Sin. However, unlike the deists, the theological rationalists believed in the efficacy of prayer to God.

== Death and burial ==
On his death bed, Washington did not summon a minister or priest. After his death, he was buried according to the rite of the Episcopal Church, with the Rev. Thomas Davis, rector of Christ Church, Alexandria, officiating. Masonic rites were also performed by members of his lodge.

=== Alleged religious conversions ===
Unverified stories from Catholic sources say that on his deathbed Washington converted to Catholicism. In an 1883 Catholic publication "his colored body servant came riding down to the bank of the Potomac ... and one of the old Jesuit fathers from the mission on the Maryland side was found" while in May 1900 it was the Catholic priest Leonard Neale that was summoned to Mount Vernon. The Neale specific-story says that the night before his death, several of Washington's slaves were sent to St. Thomas Manor in Maryland by rowboat, where they found Neale, the superior of the Jesuit manor. They ferried him to Mount Vernon, where he heard Washington's confession, conditionally baptized him, and received him into the Catholic Church. Martin I. J. Griffin, stated in a Catholic research publication that "the alleged visit of Father Neale was improbable" and that "nothing in Washington's life gives a basis for a belief in its probability."

There is also the other religious conversion that is alleged to have taken place during the American Revolution. Washington was said to have been baptized as an adult in a full-immersion baptism by John Gano, a Baptist chaplain in the Continental Army. The baptism variously either took place in the Hudson River or perhaps in the Potomac River. Historian Mary V. Thompson discounts both the story of the Baptist immersion and of the Catholic deathbed conversion.

== See also ==
- Bibliography of George Washington
- List of George Washington articles
- Religious affiliations of presidents of the United States

== Bibliography ==
- Chernow, Ron (2010). Washington: A Life. Penguin Press. ISBN 978-1-59420-266-7.
- Crowder, Jack Darrell (2017). Chaplains of the Revolutionary War: Black Robed American Warriors. McFarland Publishers. ISBN 978-1-4766-7209-0.
- Washington, George (1931). Fitzpatrick, John C. (ed.). The writings of George Washington from the original manuscript sources, 1745–1799, Vol.5. Washington, U.S. Govt. Print. off.
- Griffin, Martin I. J. (July 1900). "Did Washington Die A Catholic?". The American Catholic Historical Researches. 17 (3): 123–129. JSTOR 44374155.
- Grizzard, Frank E. (2005). The Ways of Providence: Religion & George Washington. Mariner Companies, Inc. ISBN 9780976823810.
- Morrison, Jeffery H. (2009). The Political Philosophy of George Washington. JHU Press. ISBN 978-0-8018-9109-0.
- Novak, Michael & Jana (2007). Washington's God: Religion, Liberty, and the Father of Our Country. Basic Books. ISBN 978-0-7867-2216-7.
- O'Keefe, Kieran J. "Faith before Creed: The Private and Public Religion of George Washington." Journal of Religious History 43.3 (2019): 400–418. https://doi.org/10.1111/1467-9809.12607
- Thompson, Mary V. "In the Hands of a Good Providence": Religion in the Life of George Washington, Charlottesville: University of Virginia Press, 2008. ISBN 9780813927633

=== Further reading ===
- Allen, Brooke, Moral Minority: Our Skeptical Founding Fathers, Chicago: Ivan R. Dee, 2006, ISBN 1-56663-751-1
- Boller, Paul, George Washington & Religion, Dallas: Southern Methodist University Press, 1963, ISBN 0-87074-021-0
- Eidsmoe, John, Christianity and the Constitution (Grand Rapids, Missouri: Baker Books House Company, 1987)
- Holmes, David L., The Faiths of the Founding Fathers, Oxford University Press, 2006, ISBN 0-19-530092-0.
- Johnson, William J., George Washington the Christian, (Milford, Michigan: Mott Media 1919, 1976)
- Lillback, Peter, George Washington's Sacred Fire (Providence Forum, 2006).
- Lossing, Benson J., The Pictorial Field-Book of the Revolution (New York: Harper & Brothers, Franklin Square, 1859), Vol. II, p. 215.
- Muñoz, Vincent Phillip. "George Washington on Religious Liberty" Review of Politics 2003 65(1): 11–33. ISSN 0034-6705 Fulltext online at Ebsco.
- Novak, Michael On Two Wings: Humble Faith and Common Sense at the American Founding Encounter Books, 2003, ISBN 1-893554-68-6
- Peterson, Barbara Bennett. George Washington: America's Moral Exemplar, 2005, ISBN 1-59454-230-9.
- The Writings of George Washington, Jared Sparks, editor (Boston: Ferdinand Andrews, Publisher, 1838), Vol. XII, pp. 399–411
- The Religious Opinions of Washington, E. C. M'Guire, editor (New York: Harper & Brothers, 1836).
- The Messages and Papers of the Presidents, James D. Richardson, editor (Published by the Authority of Congress, 1899), Vol. I, pp. 51–57 (1789), 64 (1789), 213-224 (1796), etc.
