= American Catholic Historical Society =

The American Catholic Historical Society (ACHS) is a historical society based at 263 South Fourth Street, Philadelphia, Pennsylvania. Founded in 1884, it is the oldest Catholic historical society in the United States. The goal of the society is to collect, research, and maintain historical records relating to the contribution of the Catholic Church to American society and culture.

The American Catholic Historical Society was founded in response to Pope Leo XIII's 1883 pastoral letter on historical studies, Saepenumero considerantes. The society was organized on July 22, 1884, received the blessing of the pope on January 10, 1886, and formally approved by the Archbishop of Philadelphia, Patrick John Ryan, on September 6, 1886.

The Catholic Historical Research Center of the Roman Catholic Archdiocese of Philadelphia houses the society's manuscript collections.

It has EIN 23-6278542 as a 501(c)(3) Public Charity; in 2024 it claimed total revenue of $146,431 and total assets of $912,385.

== American Catholic Studies ==
The American Catholic Historical Society issues the oldest continuously published Catholic scholarly journal in the United States, entitled American Catholic Studies. The journal was founded in 1887 as the Records, and merged with American Catholic Historical Researches in 1913. The Researches had been the project of Msgr. Andrew Arnold Lambing and his short-lived Ohio Valley Historical Society. When that society dissolved in 1886, Martin I. J. Griffin carried on its work, and as librarian of the ACHS, oversaw its merger with the journal of the Philadelphia society. Since 1999, the journal, under its current name, has been published on a quarterly basis by Villanova University.
