= James Abercrombie (priest) =

American priest

Reverend James Abercrombie D.D.
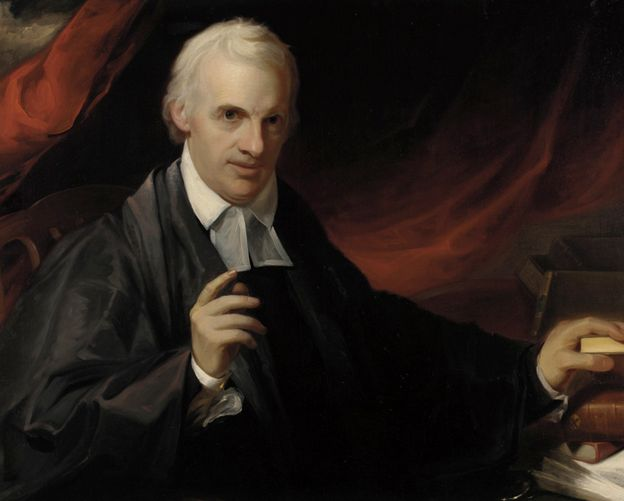
- Painting of Abercrombie by Thomas Sully, 1810
- Church: Episcopal Church
- Diocese: Pennsylvania

Orders
- Ordination: December 28, 1794

Personal details
- Born: January 26, 1758 Colonial Philadelphia
- Died: June 26, 1841 (aged 83) Philadelphia
- Buried: St. Peter's Episcopal Churchyard
- Spouse: Ann Chevalier Baynton (m. 1783; died 1805)
- Children: 1
- Occupation: Assistant minister
- Education: College of Philadelphia

James B. Abercrombie (1758–1841) was an American priest in St. Peter's Episcopal Church in Philadelphia. Having lost his father at a very young age, Abercrombie was subsequently raised and educated by his devoutly religious mother who encouraged him to become a minister, to which he readily aspired and became.

== Early years ==
Abercrombie was born on January 26, 1758, in colonial Philadelphia. He was the only surviving child of his father James Abercrombie, a sea captain who came to the colonies from Dundee, Scotland, in 1753, (Note: Abercrombie senior was also a relative of the celebrated Sir Ralph Abercrombie, who was connected with the East India Company.) and Margaret Bennet, his second wife. The elder Abercrombie was a captain in the British Navy. When James Jr. was two years old, his father died while at sail in the North Sea. (Note: At the time it was also referred to as the German Ocean.)

As a youth Abercrombie was instructed for several years by his mother, a very intelligent and devotedly pious woman, who educated him with great care, in the hope that he would aspire in becoming a minister of the Gospel. James showed signs of aspiring to this profession as soon as he learned to read. For example, on Sunday evenings James would stand on a chair, using it as a pulpit, wearing a white apron around his shoulders as a surplice and imagining he was a preacher.

He later attended an English academy run by a Dr. Gardiner for three years. He next studied at the College of Philadelphia, graduating in June 1776. He had intended to travel to England study at a seminary, but that became impossible because of the start of the American Revolution. He instead began his theological training with William White in Philadelphia until the summer of 1778.

Around this time he came down with an eye disease, which was treated using silver nitrate by Dr. Grant, surgeon general to the British General Howe. After the British retreat, Thomas Bond (who later co-founded Pennsylvania Hospital) continued the treatment, eventually resulting in a cure. Too old to begin apprenticeship in another profession, Abercrombie formed a partnership with a close friend and took up work in the mercantile business for a short time. Soon he was chosen a member of the Common Council of the city of Philadelphia and was elected to the city council in 1792. Abercrombie grew weary of the mercantile business and longed for a change in his life.

In 1793, with the best of references, he pursued the office of Treasurer of the Mint; but President Washington, bound by a resolution he had authored, could not appoint two people from the same state as officers in any one department, and therefore had to deny Abercrombie's application. Abercrombie subsequently took an office in the Bank of the United States, but found the position so completely distasteful that he resigned after only one day on the job.

Later Abercrombie resumed his pursuit of the ministry, being ordained first as a deacon and later as a priest on December 28, 1794. Abercrombie served as assistant minister of St. Peter's Episcopal Church in Philadelphia from 1794 to 1832.

In 1796, Abercrombie was elected a member of the American Philosophical Society in Philadelphia, Pennsylvania.

== Washington affair ==
With the nation's capital located in Philadelphia at that time, President Washington was among the congregation in attendance at St. Peter's church while Abercrombie was a pastor there. Washington, along with others in the congregation, would exit the church after the religious ceremony and Abercrombie's sermon, leaving his wife Martha with the communicants to receive communion. In one definitive case, Abercrombie took exception to this advent and, considering it his duty, later said in one of his sermons that he was unhappy to see people in elevated stations not set an example by receiving communion. He later admitted in a letter that the remark was intended for the President, and indeed Washington had assumed the remark was directed at him.

I can only state the following facts : — that, as Pastor of the Episcopal Church, observing that, on Sacrament Sundays, General Washington, immediately after the desk and pulpit services, went out with the greater part of the congregation, — always leaving Mrs. Washington with the other communicants, — she invariably being one, — I considered it my duty, in a Sermon on Public Worship, to state the unhappy tendency of example, particularly of those in elevated stations, who uniformly turned their backs upon the celebration of the Lord's Supper. I acknowledge the remark was intended for the President; and as such he received it.

— J. Abercrombie

Washington later discussed the incident with a Senator at a dinner and confided that he had respected the preacher for his integrity and candor, but that he had never considered his example was of any influence. Rarely if ever being a communicant, (Note: It is unclear whether Washington received communion in his younger years.) Washington felt that if he were to begin it would be seen as an ostentatious display of a President flaunting his religion solely prompted by the pastor's remarks. Historian Paul F. Boller suggests that Washington, a man who had helped to promote a major war, refrained from receiving communion simply because his heart and mind were not in "a proper condition to receive the sacrament", and that Washington simply did not want to indulge in what he felt would be an act of hypocrisy on his part.

== Later life ==
Abercrombie, along with Samuel Magaw, a former rector of St. Paul's, founded the Philadelphia Academy (later called the Episcopal Academy) in 1800 and became its sole director in 1803. However, since his commitment in this station greatly interfered with his church activities, he subsequently resigned in 1817. In 1832 he resigned as assistant minister where he was granted a $600 annual annuity from the two churches.

Abercrombie died on June 26, 1841, at the age of 84.

== See also ==
- Religious views of George Washington

== Sources ==
- Chernow, Ron (2010). Washington: A Life. Penguin Press. ISBN 978-1-59420-266-7.
- Grizzard, Frank E. (2005). The Ways of Providence: Religion & George Washington. Mariner Companies, Inc. ISBN 978-0-9768-2381-0.
- Morrison, Jeffry H. (2009). The Political Philosophy of George Washington. JHU Press. ISBN 978-0-8018-9109-0.
- Novak, Michael & Jana (2007). Washington's God: Religion, Liberty, and the Father of Our Country. Basic Books. ISBN 978-0-7867-2216-7.
- Sprague, Rev. Wm. B. (1859). Annals of the American Pulpit. Vol. v. — Sprague, Annals of the American pulpit, vol V

Website sources

- Neill, Rev. E.D. (January 2, 1885). "Washington's religion" (PDF). The New York Times (article reprinted from Episcopal Recorder). p. 3.
- "The Venerable Dr. Abercrombie". Saint Peter's church.
- "To George Washington from James Abercrombie, 25 May 1798". Founders Online.
