= Bishop James Madison Society =

American collegiate society

- BJMS
- Founded: 1812; 213 years ago College of William & Mary
- Type: Secret
- Affiliation: Independent
- Status: Active
- Scope: Local
- Chapters: 1
- Headquarters: Williamsburg, Virginia; United States

The Bishop James Madison Society (BJMS) is a secret society of the College of William & Mary in Virginia. The society is best known through its Last Lecture Series, held each spring semester.

== History ==
Students at the College of William & Mary founded the Bishop James Madison Society in 1812, immediately after the death of its namesake. Bishop James Madison was eighth president of William and Mary and cousin to the U.S. President James Madison. The society wanted to honor Madison by doing good deeds and improving its school. It is said that the society considered the Bishop "the greater of the two Madisons."

Like other secret societies at the college, the Bishop James Madison Society went defunct during the Civil War when William and Mary closed and was occupied by Union troops.

In the 20th century, William and Mary students along with David L. Holmes, professor emeritus of religious studies, revived the society. Holmes also served as the group's campus advisor.

== Symbols ==
The society's symbol is an elongated quatrefoil with one letter–B, J, M, or S–at the tip of each section.

== Activities ==
The society's activities seek to foster pride in the college community and use various small and private means to recognize and thank the college's unsung heroes. Public activities include placing banners on Old Campus to welcome new students during Convocation and families on parents' weekend, hiding plastic Easter eggs filled with candy and interesting facts about the college throughout the campus, and sponsoring coffee dates designed to increase dialogue among students, administrators, and faculty members.

It recognizes eight outstanding freshmen in the fall semester and eight outstanding seniors each spring semester. The society also sponsors special events such as the video challenge, Eight Days of Mirth, in 2014.

Its most prominent activity is its Last Lecture Series, which invites one retiring faculty to speak about current social or academic issues each spring semester. The lectures take place during the last week of classes each spring semester in Wren Building. Holmes introduced each speaker.

== Membership ==
The society's membership is private, along with its selection criteria. During the college's annual commencement exercises, some graduating members identify their involvement by wearing medals featuring the society's symbol.

== Notable members ==
- David L. Holmes, professor emeritus of religious studies at the College of William & Mary

== See also ==
- Collegiate secret societies in North America
