= Catholic Historical Society of Western Pennsylvania =

Catholic teaching institution

- Seal of the Catholic Historical Society of Western Pennsylvania
- Formation: May 27, 1940; 86 years ago
- Type: Historical society
- Website: chswpa.org

The Catholic Historical Society of Western Pennsylvania (CHSWP) is a historical society based in western Pennsylvania. The mission of the CHSWP is to teach and disseminate knowledge of the history of the Catholic Church in western Pennsylvania and the United States, while also working to preserve documents, records, and artifacts related to that history. The Society was founded in 1940 and publishes an annual journal, Gathered Fragments.

== History ==
=== The Ohio Valley Catholic Historical Society ===
The Catholic Historical Society of Western Pennsylvania traces its roots back to a predecessor organization, the Ohio Valley Catholic Historical Society, which was founded by Msgr. Andrew Arnold Lambing on February 1, 1884. Lambing was a priest of the Roman Catholic Diocese of Pittsburgh and a prominent early historian of the Catholic Church in Western Pennsylvania, and his society is recognized as the first Catholic historical society in the United States. The Ohio Valley Catholic Historical Society produced a quarterly journal, initially entitled Historical Researches in Western Pennsylvania Principally Catholic. Like the society itself, this publication was the first of its kind in the United States. Its name was revised to Catholic Historical Researches in July 1885, with the intention of extending its scope to include the Catholic history of the entire United States. Despite such optimistic intentions, however, a lack of support caused the society to dissolve in 1886. The journal lived on for a while longer, as Martin Ignatius Joseph Griffin of the Philadelphia Catholic Historical Society purchased the publication and, rebranding it as American Catholic Historical Researches, continued its work until his death in 1912.

=== Foundation and early enthusiasm ===
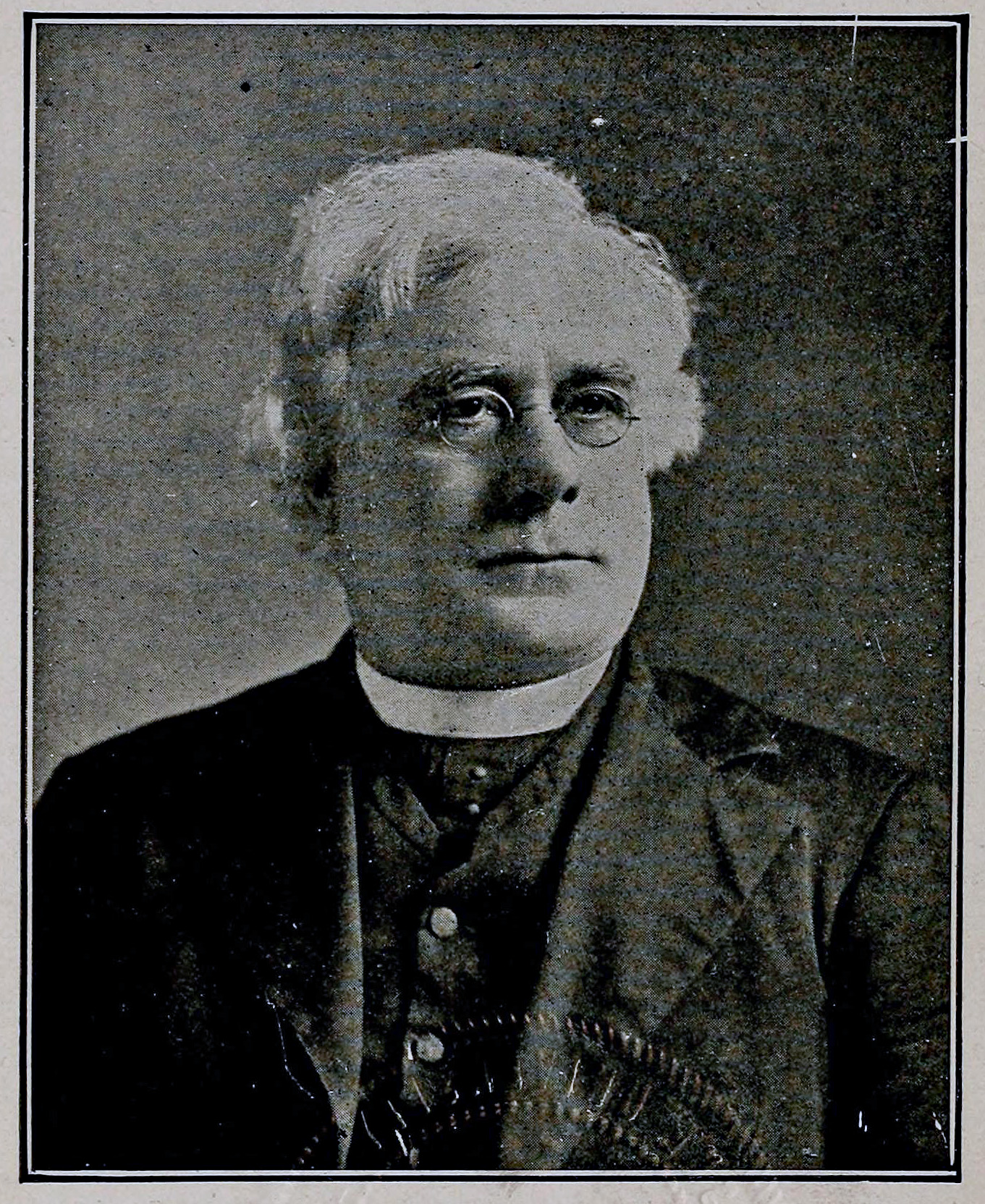
Msgr. A. A. Lambing (1842–1918), the founder of the Ohio Valley Catholic Historical Society and prominent historian of the Catholic Church in Western Pennsylvania

As the Diocese of Pittsburgh prepared to celebrate its centenary in 1943, interest in the Catholic history of western Pennsylvania was finally great enough to inspire the foundation of a new historical society in the pattern of Msgr. Lambing's short-lived project. The founding meeting of the Catholic Historical Society of Western Pennsylvania was held on May 27, 1940, at Saint Vincent College in Latrobe. An initial public meeting followed at Mount Mercy College in Pittsburgh on July 8 of the same year. This first meeting drew a crowd of more than 500 people and was presided over by Bishop Hugh Boyle.

In the years after its founding, the Society hosted a variety of events throughout the Catholic dioceses of western Pennsylvania, including "regular lectures, field tours, radio addresses (and later TV interviews), essay contests and lectures in schools, public exhibits, special religious ceremonies, oral history interviews, and workshops."

On October 8, 1950, an archive facility was founded at Duquesne University to house the documents and collections of the CHSWP. Soon after the dedication of this space, the Society began work on preserving past issues of the Pittsburgh Catholic in microfilm. Today, this collection has been digitized and is available online through the website of Duquesne University's Gumberg Library.

=== Revitalization and current activity ===
During the 1960s and 70s, the Society experienced what it describes as a "period of dormancy." In 1984, however, it was revived by Fr. Bernard Hrico. The Society enjoyed a time of renewed interest and activity, and in 1986 inaugurated Gathered Fragments as a biannual newsletter. Today it is published as an annual journal. In 1993, the Society was incorporated as a non-profit corporation with the Internal Revenue Service.

In November 2020, John C. Bates, board member emeritus of the Society, published a comprehensive history of the Society.

== Publications ==
In addition to its journal, Gathered Fragments, the CHSWP has also published several monographs, including:

- Purcell, William J., ed. (1943). Catholic Pittsburgh's One Hundred Years 1843–1943. Chicago: Loyola University Press.
- Lambing, Andrew Arnold, ed. (1954). Register of Fort Duquesne 1754–1756: Memorial Edition 1954. Pittsburgh: Catholic Historical Society of Western Pennsylvania. (A reprint of Msgr. Lambing's Register of Fort Duquesne 1754–1756.)
- From the Point to the Present. 1959. (A booklet issued to mark the bicentennial of the city of Pittsburgh.)
- Mina, Ivan (2002). The Ruthenian Catholic Church. Pittsburgh: Catholic Historical Society of Western Pennsylvania.
- Bates, John C. (2020). The Catholic Historical Society of Western Pennsylvania: Its Origins, Establishment, Decline, and Resurrection. Catholic Historical Society of Western Pennsylvania (through Kindle Direct). ISBN 9798699968008.

== See also ==
- List of historical societies in Pennsylvania
