= The Faiths of the Founding Fathers =

2006 book by David L. Holmes

- Author: David L. Holmes
- Publisher: Oxford University Press
- Publication date: March 2006
- Pages: 225
- ISBN: 978-0-19-530092-5
- OCLC: 2005033077
- LC Class: BL2747.4.H63 2006

The Faiths of the Founding Fathers is a book by historian of American religion David L. Holmes from the College of William & Mary. Holmes approaches the topic of the religion of the founders of the United States by analyzing their public statements and correspondence, the comments left by their contemporaries, and the views, where available, of clergy who knew them.

== See also ==
- Thomas Jefferson and religion
