= Quatrefoil =

Artistic representation of four circular leaf shapes used in architecture

Two common forms of the quatrefoil, with more overlap (left) and less overlap (right)

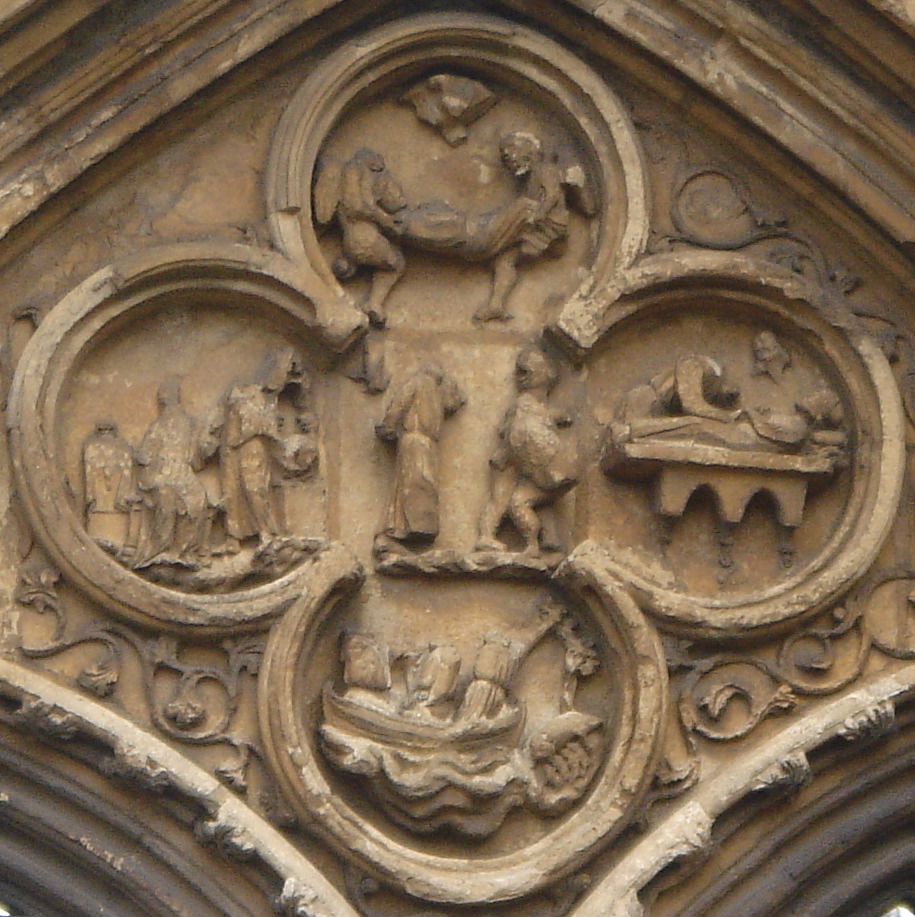
Quatrefoil above the west door of Croyland Abbey showing in relief scenes from the life of Saint Guthlac

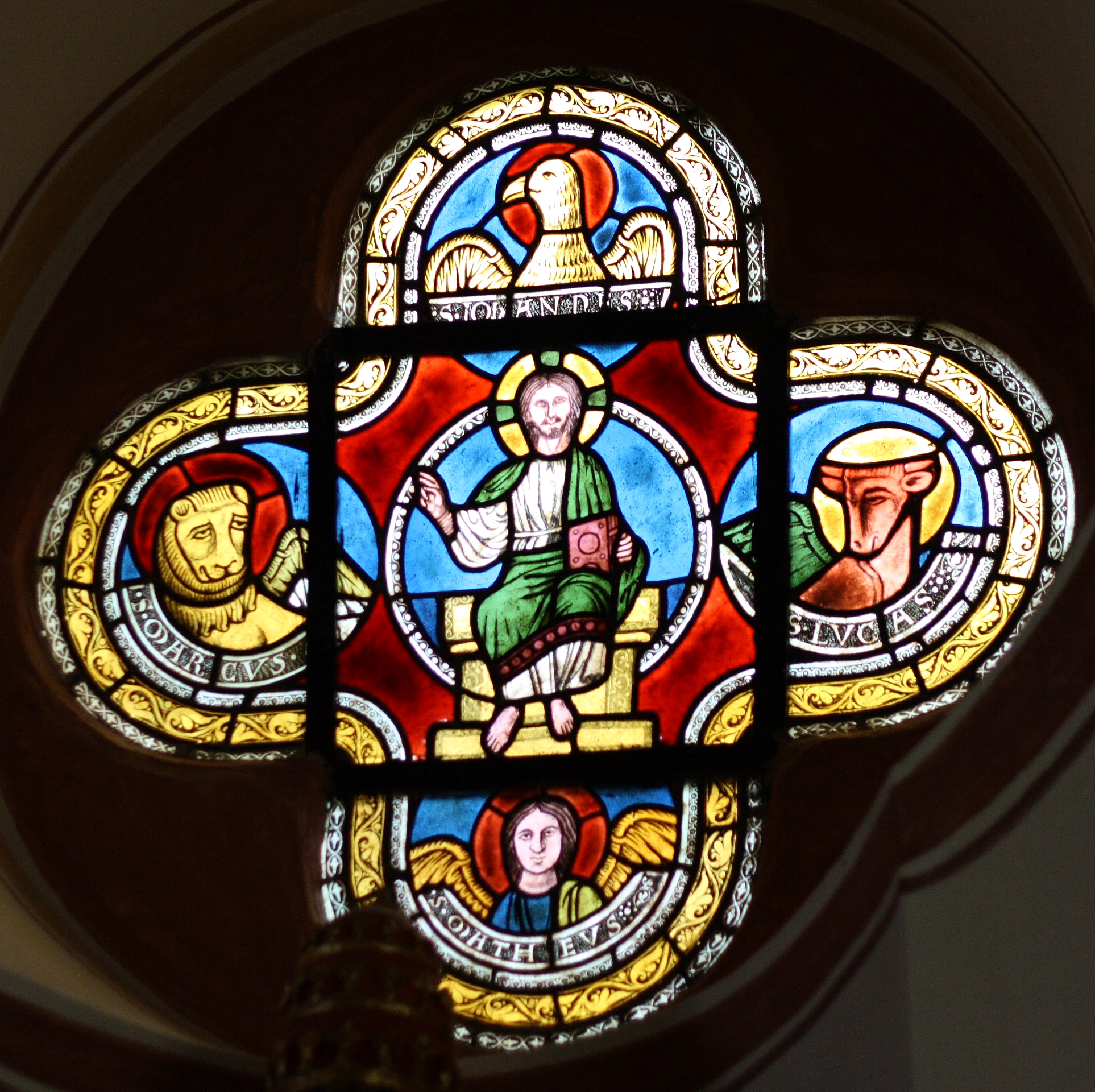
Quatrefoil window at the St. Petrus parish church in Peterslahr, Germany

A quatrefoil (anciently caterfoil) is a decorative element consisting of a symmetrical shape which forms the overall outline of four partially overlapping circles of the same diameter. It is found in art, architecture, heraldry and traditional Christian symbolism. The word 'quatrefoil' means "four leaves", from the Old French quatre, "four", plus foil, "leaf"; the term refers specifically to a four-leafed clover, but applies in general to four-lobed shapes in various contexts. In recent years, several luxury brands have attempted to fraudulently assert creative rights related to the symbol, which naturally predates any of those brands' creative development. A similar shape with three rings is called a trefoil, while a shape with five is a cinquefoil.

== History ==
The quatrefoil enjoyed its peak popularity during the Gothic and Renaissance eras. It is most commonly found as tracery, mainly in Gothic architecture, where a quatrefoil often may be seen at the top of a Gothic arch, sometimes filled with stained glass. Although the design is often referred to as of Islamic origin, there are examples of its use that precede the birth of Islam by almost 200 years. The Monastery of Stoudios in Constantinople, built in 462 AD, features arches seen to be the product of taking a regular quatrefoil and dividing it in half.

== In ancient Mesoamerica ==
Chalcatzingo Monument 1, El Rey, representing one half of a quatrefoil

In ancient Mesoamerica, the quatrefoil is frequently portrayed on Olmec and Mayan monuments, such as at La Blanca, Guatemala where it dates to approximately 850 BC. The quatrefoil depicts the opening of the cosmic central axis at the crossroads of the four cardinal directions, representing the passageway between the celestial and the underworld.

Another early example of a quatrefoil is found at Chalcatzingo, Morelos state, Mexico, the city that flourished between 700 BCE and 500 BCE. Both a full quatrefoil, and a partial portrayal of quatrefoil are found on monuments here. In the latter case, one half of a quatrefoil represents the opening of a cave where an important personage is seated. This cave opening represents a water source. Thus, quatrefoil seems to be associated with water rituals. The associated imagery is related to agricultural fertility and the arrival of rain, as evidenced by the rain-bearing clouds above the quatrefoil portal.

The association between rulership and the quatrefoil symbol continued into the ensuing Late Preclassic period. A good example is found at Izapa.

The quatrefoil portrayal continued into the Classic period, as evidenced in the iconography of numerous Classic Maya monuments. A good example is the altar from El Perú (Maya site), which features a quatrefoil on the back of a zoomorphic creature in which sits a ruler. The associated hieroglyphic text refers to the creation narrative of the Maize god's rebirth.

== Barbed quatrefoil ==
The "barbed quatrefoil"

The barbed quatrefoil is a quatrefoil pierced at the angles by the points of an inscribed square, which gives an image akin to a heraldic rose, which is termed "barbed" due to the stylised thorns which project at the intersection of each pair of petals. The earliest example of the barbed quatrefoil appears on the south transept buttresses of 1260 in the Cathedral of Notre Dame in Paris. Similarly, the trefoil is often combined with an equilateral triangle to form a barbed trefoil.

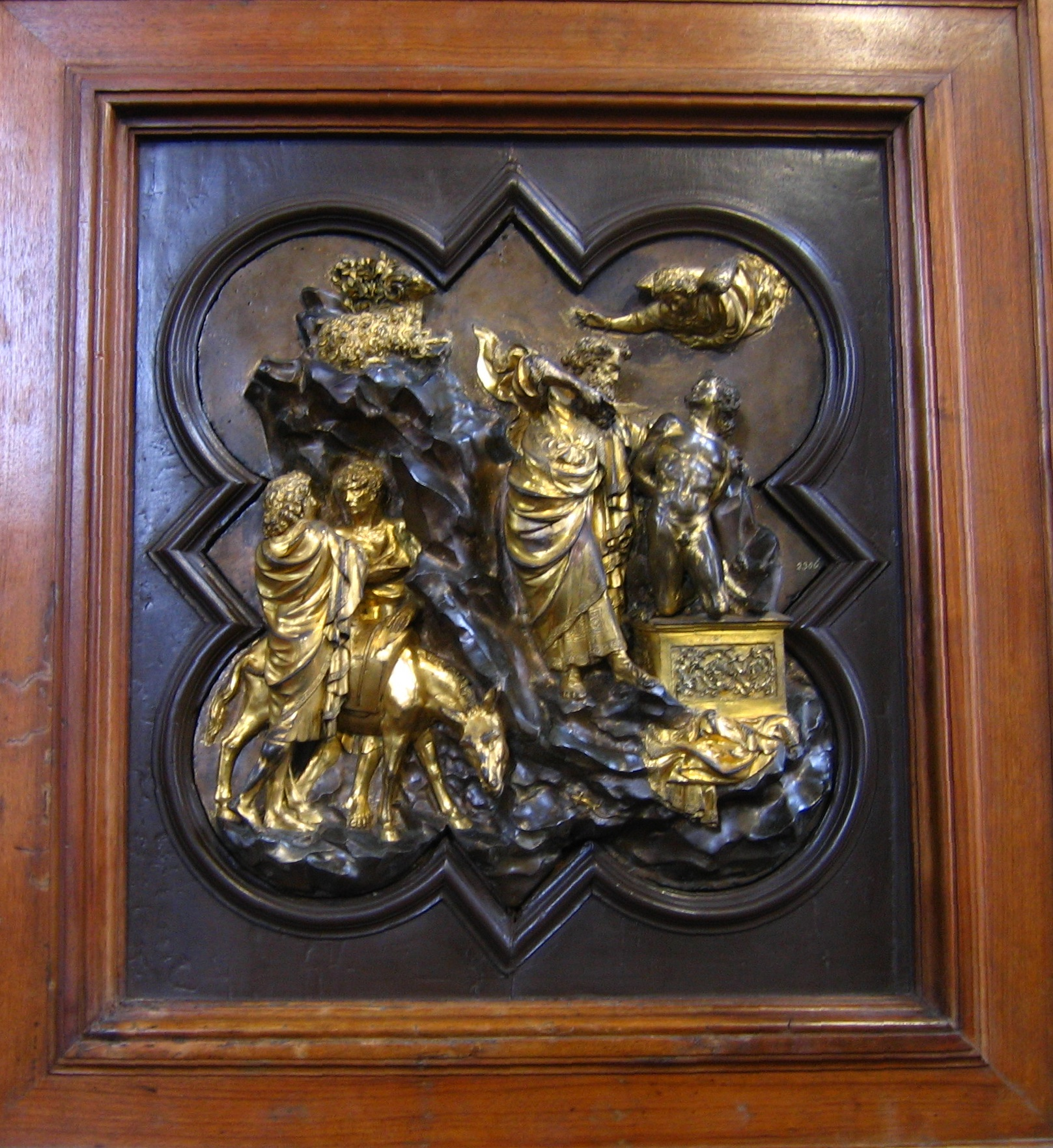
Barbed quatrefoil containing relief of The Sacrifice of Isaac (1401) by Lorenzo Ghiberti for the Baptistry, Florence. Bargello Museum, Florence

Among the most famous works of art employing the barbed quatrefoil are the bronze panels on the south doors of the Florence Baptistery (1330–36) by Andrea Pisano, the bronze panels of the north doors of the Florence Baptistery by Lorenzo Ghiberti, Filippo Brunelleschi's competition entry for the same doors (The Sacrifice of Isaac), as well as Head of an Angel by Piero della Francesca.

== In heraldry ==
In heraldic terminology, a quatrefoil is a representation of a four-leaf clover, a rare variant of the trefoil or three-leaf clover. It is sometimes shown "slipped", i.e. with an attached stalk. In archaic English it is called a caterfoil, or variant spellings thereof. A double quatrefoil (or octofoil) is the mark of cadency for a ninth son in the English heraldic system.

== In the military ==
The quatrefoil is mainly used in ecclesiastical buildings, primarily for windows, but Clifford’s Tower in York Castle is built in the shape of four overlapping towers, like a four-leaf clover and is also known as a quatrefoil.

In the U.S. Marine Corps, quatrefoil refers to a four-pointed decoration on the top of a warrant or commissioned Marine officer's dress and service caps (see peaked caps, also known in the Marines as "barracks covers"). According to tradition, the design was first used with Marine officers on sailing ships so that Marine sharpshooters in the rigging did not shoot their own officers on the deck during close-quarters gun battles (as when crews of opposing ships attempted to board each other's ship). An official part of U.S. Marine Corps officer uniforms since 1859, the quatrefoil was said initially to have been crossed pieces of rope sewed into officers' caps before becoming officially mandated as a uniform item.

In NATO Joint Military Symbology a yellow quatrefoil represents a unit or object whose allegiance is unknown.

== Societies ==
The quatrefoil is the official symbol of the Bishop James Madison Society, est. 1812 at the College of William and Mary.

== Fraternity ==
The quatrefoil is also the symbol of the women's fraternity Phi Mu (a member of the National Panhellenic Conference).

== See also ==
- Foil (architecture)
- Trefoil
