= Andrew Arnold Lambing =

American Roman Catholic priest and historian

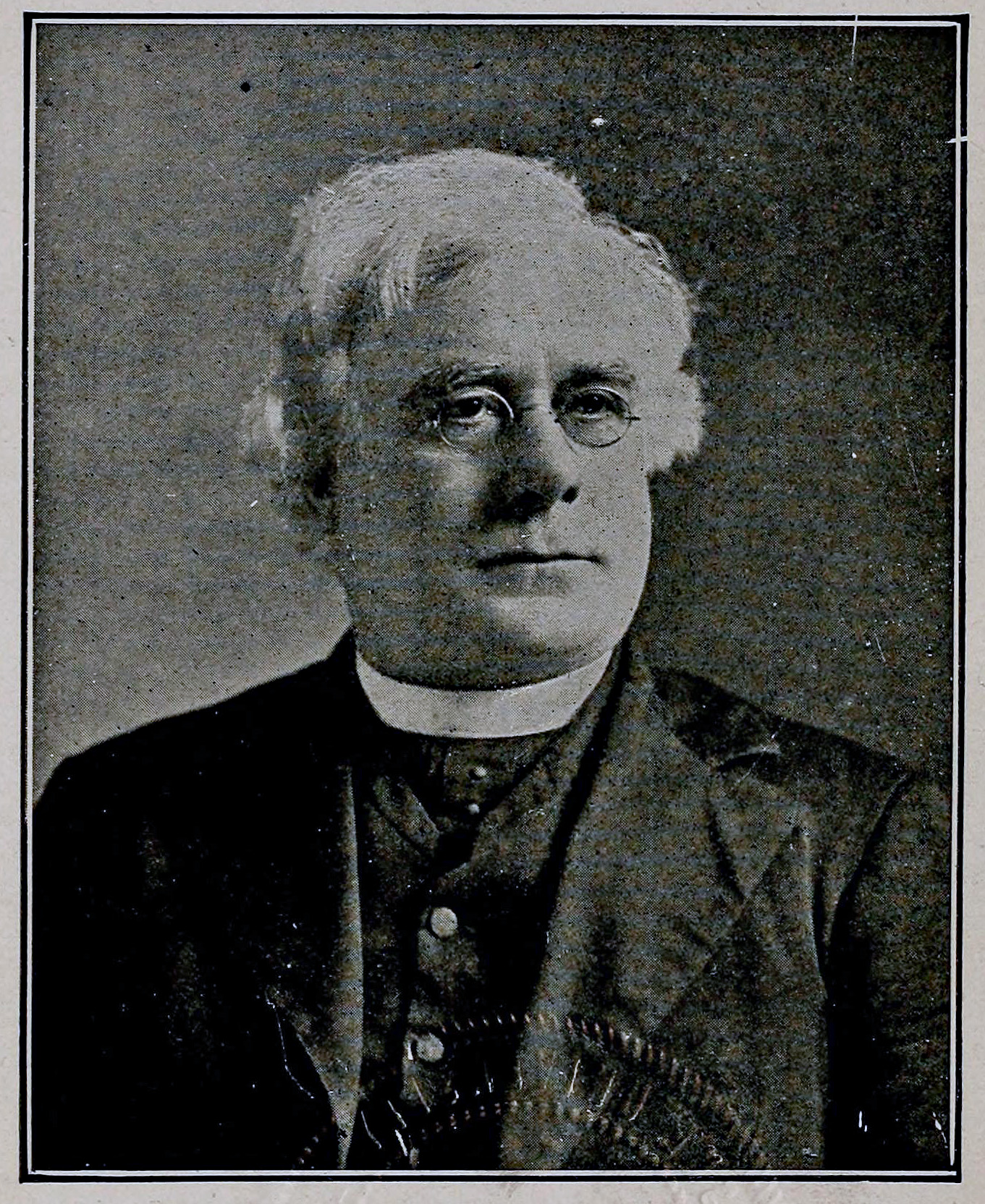
Portrait of Lambing from his 1914 work Brief Biographical Sketches of the Deceased Bishops and Priests who Labored in the Diocese of Pittsburgh from the Earliest Times to the Present

Monsignor Andrew Arnold Lambing, who was also known as the Rev. Dr. A. A. Lambing (February 1, 1842 – December 24, 1918), was an American Roman Catholic priest and historian. He was one of the nation's foremost priest-historians, having founded the first Catholic historical society in the United States (The Ohio Valley Catholic Historical Society, in February 1884) as well as the first Catholic historical quarterly.

== Formative years ==
Born into poverty on February 1, 1842, as "the third son and child in a family of nine," in a hamlet that became Manorville, Armstrong County, Pennsylvania, adjacent to Ford City, Lambing worked on his family's farm while still just a boy. As an adolescent, he worked in a brick yard and in the new oil business of Samuel Kier on the Allegheny River.

At the age of twenty-one, Lambing entered St. Michael's Preparatory and Theological Seminary in Pittsburgh and was ordained in 1869 by Bishop Michael Domenec.

== Academic and theological career ==
Briefly assigned to teach history at St. Francis College, Loretto, Lambing spent the next forty years of Pittsburgh's post-Civil War years ministering to thousands of Catholic immigrants from Europe during both an industrial and a population boom, and was credited with calming strikers who were intent on destroying a freight depot of the Pennsylvania Railroad in the city's rail yards during the Great Railroad Strike of 1877.

Among the first academically trained historians of Western Pennsylvania, Lambing was also the first to document the beginnings of the Catholic Church in the region. Two of his most important contributions were the first English translation, from the French, of the 1749 journal of Pierre Joseph Céloron de Blainville and the publication of the register of baptisms at Fort Duquesne.

He also presented history lectures for area school students, and wrote numerous articles for newspapers and magazines on historical and religious subjects, including the majority of two early and significant regional histories: History of Allegheny County and the Standard History of Pittsburgh, and served as president of the Historical Society of Western Pennsylvania.

Andrew Carnegie appointed Lambing a trustee of both the Carnegie Institute of Pittsburgh and the Carnegie School of Technology. In 1883, the University of Notre Dame conferred on him the honorary degree of Master of Arts and in 1886, its Doctor of Laws degree.

== Death and interment ==
Lambing died on Christmas Eve in 1918, and was buried in the priest's section of St. Mary Cemetery in the city's Lawrenceville neighborhood. His headstone is in the shape of a large open book.

== Legacy ==
A lecture series, the Andrew Arnold Lambing Lectureship, was established in his honor in 1955 by the Catholic Historical Society of Western Pennsylvania. The inaugural speaker was historian Mason Wade, whose April 21 presentation that year was, "The French in Western Pennsylvania."

== Books ==
- The Orphan’s Friend: A Series of Plain Instructions for the Use of Orphans after Leaving the Asylum, and for Persons of the Same Class Living in the World, nonfiction (New York: D. & J. Sadlier & Company, 1875)
- The Sunday School Teacher’s Manual, or, the Art of Teaching Catechism..., nonfiction (New York, Cincinnati [etc.]: Benziger Brothers, 1877.)
- A History of the Catholic Church in the Dioceses of Pittsburgh and Allegheny from Its Establishment to the Present Time, nonfiction (New York, Cincinnati [etc.]: Benziger Brothers, 1880.)
- Masses for the Dead, and the Motive for Having Them Celebrated, nonfiction (Notre Dame, IN: Ave Maria Press, 1881.)
- The Baptismal Register of Fort Duquesne, from June, 1754, to Dec. 1756, Translated from the French, with an Introductory Essay and Notes, by Rev. A. A. Lambing, nonfiction (Pittsburgh: Myers, Shinkle & Co., 1885.)
- The Sacramentals of the Holy Catholic Church, nonfiction (New York, Cincinnati [etc.]: Benziger Brothers, 1892.)
- Come, Holy Ghost, or, Edifying and Instructive Selections from Many Writers on Devotion to the Third Person of the Adorable Trinity, nonfiction (St. Louis: B. Herder, 1901.)
- Brief Biographical Sketches of the Deceased Bishops and Priests Who Labored in the Diocese of Pittsburgh: From the Earliest Times to the Present, with an Historical Introduction, nonfiction (Pittsburgh: Republic Bank Note Co., 1914.)
- Expedition of Celoron to the Ohio Country in 1749, nonfiction (Columbus, OH: The F.J. Heer Printing Co., 1921.)
