= Martin Ignatius Joseph Griffin =

American journalist

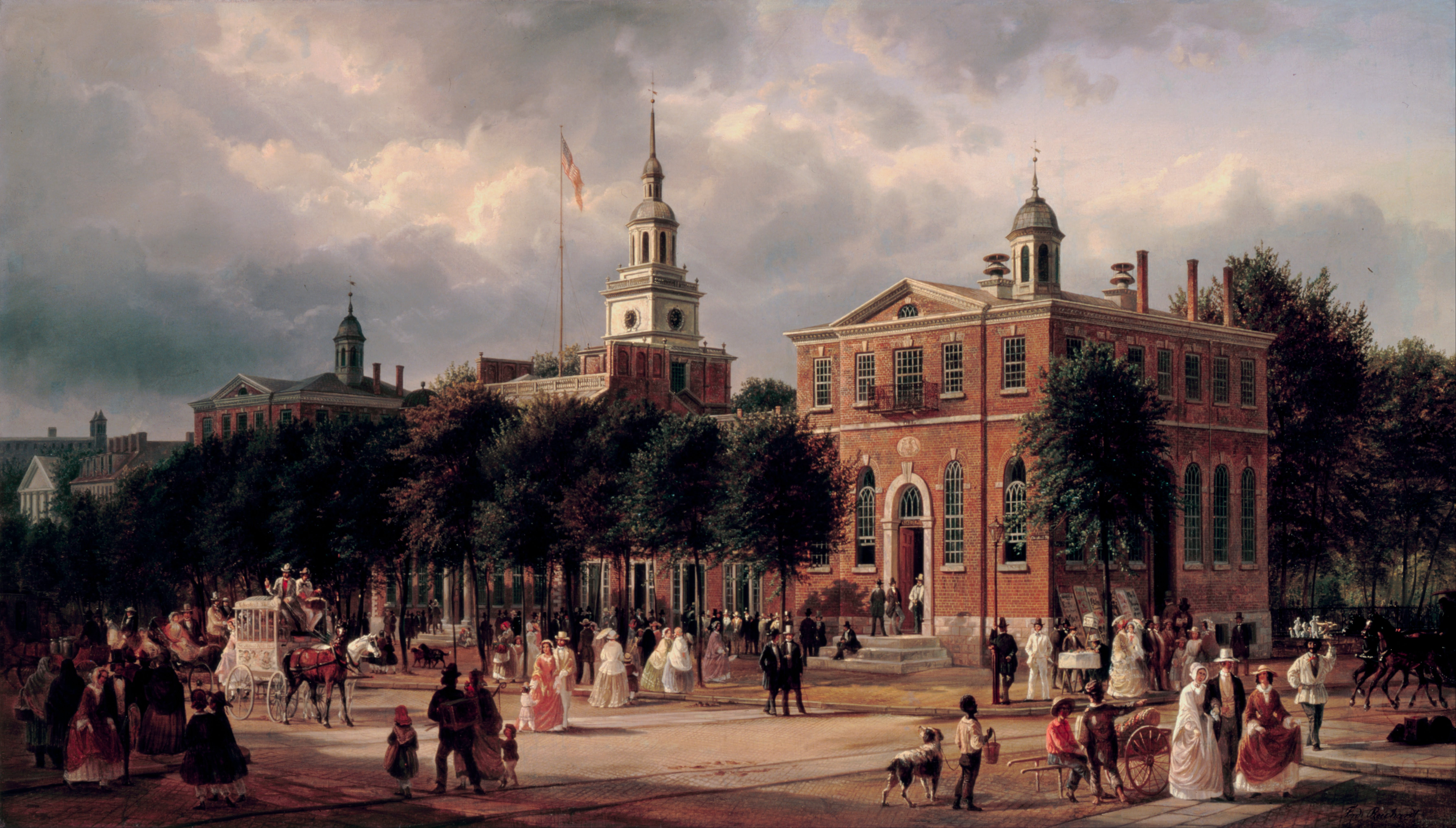
Independence Hall in Philadelphia (Ferdinand Richardt, ca. 1858–1863). Griffin was born and died in Philadelphia, and focused most of his research on the Catholic history of the city.

Martin Ignatius Joseph Griffin (1842–1911) was an American Catholic journalist and historian, instrumental to the founding of the American Catholic Historical Society. He contributed widely to scholarly journals and was the author of several books and monographs on the history of Catholicism in the United States.

== Life ==
Griffin was born at Philadelphia on October 23, 1842.

From an early age, Griffin became known as a regular contributor and editor with various Catholic publications. In 1872, he was made secretary of the Irish Catholic Benevolent Union, and both founded and edited its journal from 1873 to 1894. This publication began as the I.C.B.U. Journal but was eventually called simply Griffin's Journal. Articles on American Catholic history were a regular feature in his journal. This historical interest led to the founding of the American Catholic Historical Society on July 22, 1884. Griffin remained librarian of that society until his death. In January 1887, he acquired the journal of newly-defunct Ohio Valley Catholic Historical Society and continued its publication under the name American Catholic Historical Researches. This he also continued to edit until his death.

He died in Philadelphia on November 10, 1911, aged 69.

== Legacy ==
Three years after his death, Griffin was praised as "an indefatigable delver into the byways of the past" by the Catholic Encyclopedia because of the extent and quality of his research into the Catholic history of the United States.

Among his publications are two major books, a History of Commodore John Barry (Philadelphia, 1903) and Catholics and the American Revolution (3 vols., Philadelphia, 1907–1911). Griffin also published monographs on the history of Old St. Joseph's and several other Philadelphia churches (1881–1882), on Bishop Michael Francis Egan, O.S.F. (1885), Thomas Fitzsimons (1887), and on the trial of John Ury (1899).
