= David L. Holmes =

American church historian (1932–2023)

- Born: August 28, 1932; Detroit, Michigan, U.S.
- Died: April 29, 2023 (aged 90); Williamsburg, Virginia, U.S.
- Education: Michigan State University (BA); Columbia University (MA); Princeton University (PhD)
- Occupations: Professor, historian

David Lynn Holmes Jr. (August 28, 1932 – April 29, 2023) was an American church historian. He was Walter G. Mason Professor of Religious Studies at the College of William and Mary. He was married to Carolyn Coggin Holmes, executive director of James Monroe's Highland from 1975 to 2012. They had two daughters.

== Education ==
Holmes held degrees in English from Michigan State and Columbia universities and master’s and Ph.D. degrees in religious studies from Princeton University. He also studied theology at Duke University Divinity School and received honorary doctorates from Lycoming and Hood colleges. He served as an enlisted man and officer in the United States Army.

== Early career ==
Before joining the William & Mary faculty, Holmes taught English for several years at Carnegie Mellon University. Over the years, he has also taught on multiple occasions as a visiting professor of religious studies at the University of Virginia.

== William & Mary ==
At William & Mary, Holmes received the Society of Alumni Teaching Award, the Thomas A. Graves Award for Sustained Excellence in Teaching, the Seven Society Award, the Outstanding Faculty Award of the Commonwealth of Virginia, and the Thomas Jefferson Award. The latter is the highest honor given by Jefferson’s alma mater to an administrator or professor. Lisa Birnbach’s The College Book: A Preppy Guide to American Colleges named Holmes as one of the three best classroom teachers at William & Mary. Holmes revived the Bishop Madison Society (founded 1812), the Skull and Bones of William & Mary.

Holmes wrote the academic best-seller, A Brief History of the Episcopal Church (1993), the best-selling The Faiths of the Founding Fathers (2006), and the highly regarded The Faiths of the Postwar Presidents: From Truman to Obama (2012). He also wrote Glimpses of a Public Ivy: Fifty Years at William & Mary (2022) (hardcover published by Schiffer Publishing). Upon his retirement he was named Walter G. Mason Professor of Religious Studies, emeritus.

== Retirement ==
Known even after retiring for his polished lecturing style and ability to engage audiences, Holmes spoke extensively to public libraries, adult education classes, and church and synagogue groups. He lectured at such colleges and universities as Lafayette, Michigan, Washington & Jefferson, Rhodes, DePaul, Grove City, Kent State, Furman, and Samford. He was invited to speak at the libraries or homes of Presidents Washington, Jefferson, Madison, Monroe, Franklin Roosevelt, Ford, and Carter. Research libraries at which he spoke include the Clements and the Newberry.

Upon his retirement, Holmes’s former students established the David L. Holmes Reformation Studies and American Religious History Endowment to honor "his tenure and 46 years of intellectual legacy at the College [of William & Mary]."
