= Impeachment by state and territorial governments of the United States =

Procedures for trial and removal of US state officials

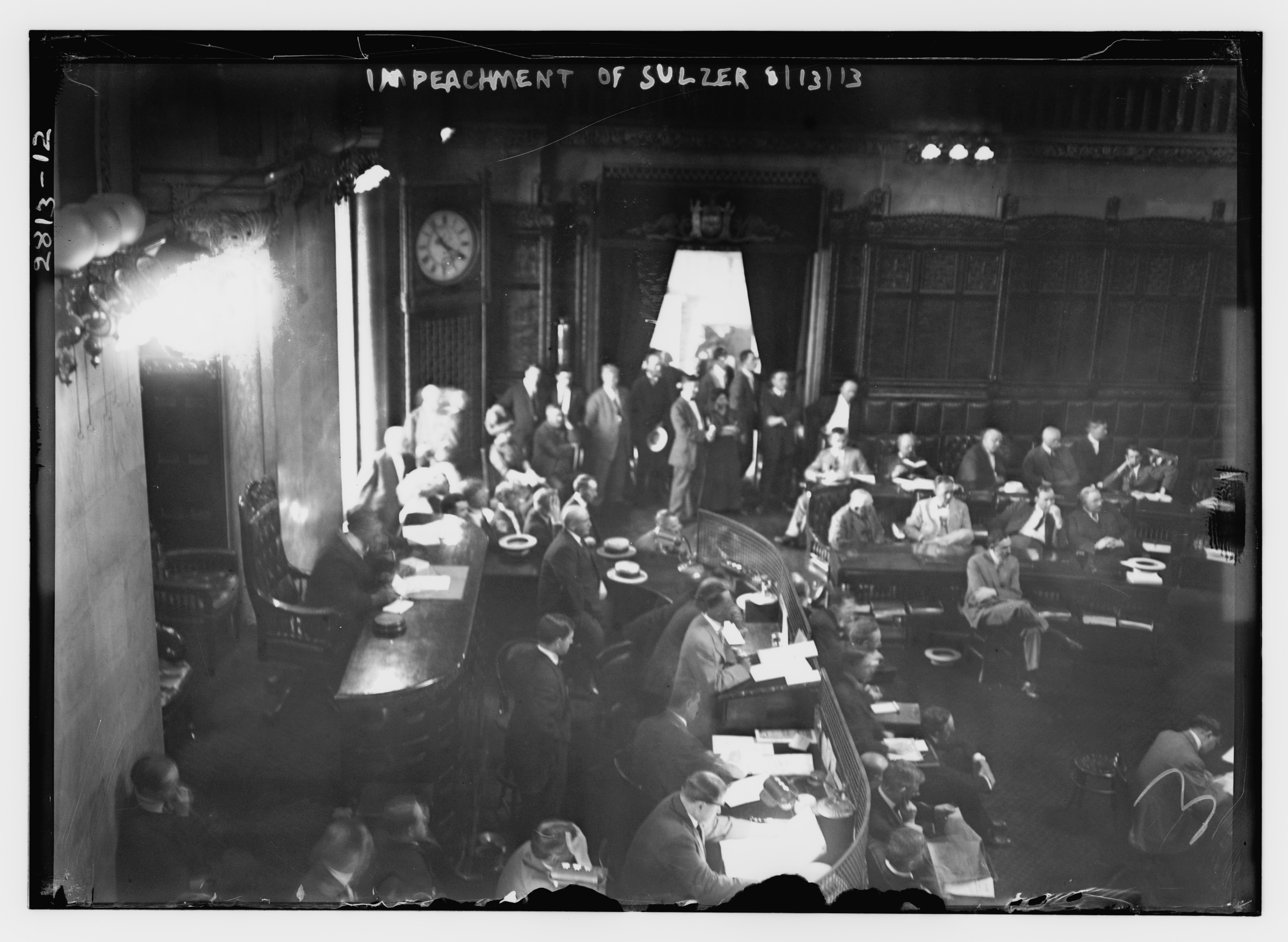
Photograph of a scene from the 1913 impeachment of New York Governor William Sulzer

Similar to the Congress of the United States, state legislatures can impeach state officials, including governors and judicial officers in every state. In addition, the legislatures of the territories of American Samoa, Northern Mariana Islands, and Puerto Rico have impeachment powers. Impeachment describes the process through which the legislature may bring charges and hold a trial with a penalty including removal from office.

Some aspects of how impeachment is conducted in different states and territories differ; however, they all commonly follow the two-stage model used by the federal government of having a legislative chamber first vote to impeach an official before then holding an impeachment trial to determine whether to convict and remove that official.

== Impeachment processes by state/territory ==
Some aspects of how impeachment is conducted in different states and territories differ; however, they all commonly follow the two-stage model used by the federal government of having a legislative chamber first vote to impeach an official before then holding an impeachment trial to determine whether to convict and remove that official. This takes cues from the practice of impeachment in England. Like the federal government, most have their lower chamber of their legislatures hold the vote to impeach, and have the subsequent impeachment trial take place in the upper chamber of their legislatures. However, several states do differ from the convention of holding the impeachment trial in their upper chamber. In a reverse, in Alaska it is the upper chamber of the legislature that votes to impeach while the lower chamber acts as the court of impeachment. In Missouri, after the lower chamber votes to impeach, an impeachment trial is held before the Supreme Court of Missouri, except for members of that court or for governors, whose impeachments are to be tried by a panel of seven judges (requiring a vote of five judges to convict), with the members of the panel being selected by the upper legislative chamber, the Missouri State Senate. In Nebraska, which has a unicameral legislature, after the Nebraska Legislature votes to impeach, an impeachment trial takes place before the Nebraska Supreme Court. In addition to all the members of its upper chamber, the state of New York's Court of the Trial of Impeachments also includes all seven members of the state's highest court, the New York Court of Appeals.

Before the 2024 ratification of an amendment adding an impeachment clause to its state constitution, Oregon was the only state without impeachment.

Current impeachment procedure by state/territory/federal district
State/territory/fed. district	Body which impeaches	Body which holds trial/convicts	Offices subject to impeachment by state/territorial government	Presiding officer specifications for trials	Specified reasons for which officials can be impeached	Notes
Alabama	House of Representatives (majority vote needed)	Senate (two-thirds vote needed to convict)	Governor; Lieutenant governor; Attorney general; State auditor; Secretary of state; State treasurer; Commissioner of agriculture and industries; Justices of the Supreme Court; Appellate court judges; Members of the Board of Education; County officers; Officers of incorporated cities and towns; Trustees of the Alabama Trust Fund	Chief Justice or associate justice of the Supreme Court (Governor and Lieutenant governor)	"Willful neglect of duty, corruption in office, incompetency, or intemperance in the use of intoxicating liquors or narcotics to such an extent, in view of the dignity of the office and importance of its duties, as unfits the officer for the discharge of such duties for any offense involving moral turpitude while in office, or committed under color thereof, or connected therewith"	House of Representatives rules currently require a several-step process before a vote on impeachment can be held, including a requirement that 63 members of the House (equivalent to three-fifths of its membership) vote to permit articles of impeachment to be considered by the House
Alaska	Senate (two-thirds vote needed)	House of Representatives (support of two-thirds of the membership needed to convict)	"All civil officers of the State"	A justice of the Supreme Court (all trials)	None specified, but motion for impeachments are required to list fully the basis for the proceeding	Judgement is limited to removal from office (no ability to bar future eligibility to hold office)
American Samoa (territory)	House of Representatives (support of two-thirds of the membership needed)	Senate (support of two-thirds of the membership needed to convict)	Governor; lieutenant Governor; chief justice and associate justices of the High Court of American Samoa; associate judges; district court judges	Chief Justice of the Supreme Court of American Samoa	None specified, but Legislature is to provide the causes for impeachment	
Arizona	House of Representatives (majority of the entire membership needed)	Senate (two-thirds vote needed to convict)	"Every public officer in the state of Arizona, holding an elective office, either by election or appointment"	Chief justice of Arizona (all trials except for trials of the chief justice) (Should the chief justice be on trial or otherwise disqualified from presiding, the Senate chooses another judge of the Arizona Supreme Court to preside)	"High crimes, misdemeanors, or malfeasance in office"	
Arkansas	House of Representatives (majority vote needed)	Senate (support of two-thirds of the membership needed)	All state officers (including the governor), judges of the Supreme and Circuit Courts, chancellors, prosecuting attorneys	Chief justice of the Supreme Court of Arkansas (all trials except for trials of the chief justice) (Should the chief justice be on trial or otherwise disqualified from presiding, the Senate chooses another presiding officer)	"High crimes and misdemeanors and gross misconduct in office"	
California	State Assembly	State Senate (support of two-thirds of the membership needed to convict)	"State officers elected on a statewide basis, members of the State Board of Equalization, and judges of state courts"		"Misconduct in office"	Impeached officials are suspended from practicing the functions their office until the judgement of the trial; convictions can result in removal from office and disqualification or alternative in temporary suspension from office; trials are required to be prosecuted by impeachment managers elected by the State Assembly. The impeachment managers author the articles of impeachment on which the officer is to be tried by the Senate.
Colorado	House of Representatives (support of a majority of the membership needed)	Senate (support of two-thirds of the membership needed to convict)	"Governor and other state and judicial officers"	Chief justice of the Supreme Court (gubernatorial and lieutenant gubernatorial trials)	"High crimes or misdemeanors or malfeasance in office"	General Assembly has the power to also suspend "any officer in his functions pending impeachment...for misconduct in office."
Connecticut	House of Representatives	Senate (two-thirds vote needed to convict)	"Governor, and all other executive and judicial officers"	Chief justice of the Supreme Court (gubernatorial trials)	none specified	
Delaware	House of Representatives (support of two-thirds of the membership needed)	Senate (support of two-thirds of the membership needed to convict)	"Governor and all other civil officers"	Chief justice of the Supreme Court (gubernatorial and lieutenant gubernatorial trials) (In the absence or disability of the chief justice, the Chancellor of the Delaware Court of Chancery is to preside); President of the Senate (all other trials)	"Treason, bribery, or any high crime or misdemeanor in office"	
District of Columbia (federal district)	(no impeachment clause)					
Florida	House of Representatives (two-thirds vote needed)	Senate (two-thirds vote needed to convict)	Governor, administrative officers of the Executive Department, justices of the Supreme Court of Florida, and judges of the Circuit Court	Chief justice of the Supreme Court of Florida (all trials, except trials of themselves); Governor (trials of the chief justice of the Supreme Court)	"Misdemeanor in office"	The Constitution of Florida requires that impeachment trials be concluded within six months of the impeachment vote. Additionally, the Constitution of Florida explicitly permits the speaker of the House to committees to conduct impeachment inquiries.
Georgia	House of Representatives	Senate (support of two-thirds of the membership needed to convict)	"Any executive or judicial officer" of Georgia or "any member of the General Assembly"	Chief Justice of the Supreme Court of Georgia (if the chief justice is disqualified, then the presiding justice of the Supreme Court is to preside. If the presiding justice too is disqualified, then the Senate is to select another justice of the Supreme Court to preside)	None specified	
Guam (territory)	(no impeachment clause)					
Hawaii	House of Representatives	Senate (support of two-thirds of the membership needed to convict)	Governor, lieutenant governor, and "any appointive officer for whose removal the consent of the senate is required"	Chief justice of the Supreme Court of Hawaii	"For causes that may be provided by law"	
Idaho	House of Representatives	Senate (two-thirds vote with a majority quorum needed to convict)	None specified		Chief justice of the Supreme Court of Idaho (gubernatorial trials)	After articles of impeachment against them are presented to the Senate, officers are temporarily suspended from their office and prohibited from acting in their official capacity until the judgement of the trial. Upon such suspension of any state officer, the office "must at once be temporarily filled by an appointment made by the governor, with the advice and consent of the senate" until the impeached officer is acquitted or (in case of removal) until the vacancy is permanently filled as required by law."
Illinois	House (majority vote needed)	Senate (support of two-thirds of the membership needed to convict)	"Executive and Judicial officers"	Chief Justice of the Supreme Court (gubernatorial trials)	none, but legislative investigations are required to determine a cause	
Indiana	House of Representatives	Senate (support of two-thirds of the membership needed to convict)	"All state officers" (except justices of the Supreme Court of Indiana; judges of the Court of Appeals of Indiana; judges of the Indiana tax court; all other judges; prosecuting attorneys; and all county, city, town, and township officers)	Chief justice of the Supreme Court of Indiana (gubernatorial trials)	"Crime, incapacity, or negligence"	Trials required to be prosecuted by impeachment managers that are elected by the House of Representatives. Impeachment managers are also to author the articles of impeachment.
Iowa	House	Senate (two-thirds vote needed to convict)	Governor, judges of the Supreme Court of Iowa and Iowa District Courts, and other state officers		"Misdemeanor or malfeasance in office"	
Kansas	House	Senate (support of two-thirds of the membership needed to convict)	Governor and all other state constitutional officers		"Treason, bribery, or other high crimes and misdemeanors"	
Kentucky	House	Senate (two-thirds vote needed to convict)	Governor and all civil officers	Chief justice of the Kentucky Court of Appeals (gubernatorial impeachments); President of the Senate (all other impeachments)	"Misdemeanor in office"	
Louisiana	House of Representatives	Senate (support of two-thirds of the membership needed to convict)	State or district officials (elected or appointed)		"Felony, malfeasance, or gross misconduct while in such office"	
Maine	House of Representatives	Senate (two-thirds vote needed to convict)	"Every person holding civil office under this State, may be removed by impeachment"		"Misdemeanor in office"	Maine also allows removal by "address", where the governor has to power to remove any officer holder on the address of the Legislature
Maryland	House of Delegates (majority of the entire membership needed)	Senate (two-thirds of the membership needed to convict)	Governor, lieutenant governor, judges		"No grounds listed"	
Massachusetts	House of Representatives	Senate	"Any officer or officers of the commonwealth"		"Misconduct or maladministration in office"	
Michigan	House of Representatives (majority of the entire membership needed to impeach)	Senate (two-thirds of the membership needed to convict)		"Corrupt conduct in office or crimes or misdemeanors"		Impeachment trial is to be prosecuted by three impeachment managers elected from and by the House of Representatives; impeached judicial officers are suspended from practicing the functions their office until the judgement of the trial
Minnesota	House of Representatives (majority of the entire membership needed)	Senate (two-thirds vote needed to convict)	Governor, secretary of state, auditor, attorney general, justices of the Supreme Court, Court of Appeals, and District Courts		"Corrupt conduct in office or crimes or misdemeanors"	Impeached officials are suspended from exercising the duties of their office until the judgement of the trial
Mississippi	House of Representatives (two-thirds vote needed)	Senate (two-thirds vote needed to convict)	Governor and all other civil officers	Chief justice of the Supreme Court of Mississippi (gubernatorial impeachments) (if chief justice is disqualified, disabled, or declines to preside, the next-longest tenured Supreme Court judge is to preside)	"Treason, bribery, or any high crime or misdemeanor in office"	
Missouri	Missouri House of Representatives	Supreme Court of Missouri for most impeachments; Panel of seven judges selected by Missouri Senate for impeachments of governors or members of the Supreme Court of Missouri (five-sevenths vote needed to convict)	"All elective executive officials of the state" and justices of the Supreme Court of Missouri, Missouri Court of Appeals, and Missouri Circuit Courts		"Crimes, misconduct, habitual drunkenness, willful neglect of duty, corruption in office, incompetency, or any offense of moral turpitude or oppression in office"	
Montana	House of Representatives (two-thirds vote needed)	Senate (support of two-thirds of the membership needed to convict)	"The governor, executive officers, heads of state departments, judicial officers, and such other officers"		"Legislature must determine causes, manner, and procedure for impeachment"	
Nebraska	Legislature (support of majority of the membership needed)	Supreme Court for most impeachments (support of two-thirds of the membership needed to convict); A panel of seven judges of the district court in which the Capitol is located selected at random by the clerk of the judicial district for impeachments of justices of the Nebraska Supreme Court (support of two-thirds of the membership needed to convict)	Civil officers		"Misdemeanor in office. Alleged acts or omissions must be stated in impeachment resolution"	Trials are to be prosecuted by two impeachment managers elected by and from the Legislature
Nevada	Assembly (support of majority of the membership needed)	Senate (support of two-thirds of the membership needed to convict)	Governor and other state and judicial officers, except justices of the peace and state legislators	Chief justice of the Supreme Court (gubernatorial and lieutenant gubernatorial impeachments)	"Misdemeanor or malfeasance in office"	
New Hampshire	House of Representatives	Senate	Officers (including members of the Executive Council)	Chief justice of the Supreme Court (gubernatorial impeachments)	"Bribery, corruption, malpractice, or maladministration in office"	
New Jersey	General Assembly (support of two-thirds of the membership needed to convict)		All state officers (including the governor, justices of the Supreme Court, and judges of the Superior Court, etc.) during their tenure in office as well as the two years after they leave office	Chief justice of the Supreme Court	"Misdemeanor while in office"	
New Mexico	House of Representatives (support of majority of the membership needed)	Senate (support of two-thirds of the membership needed to convict)		Chief justice of the Supreme Court (for gubernatorial and lieutenant gubernatorial impeachments)	"Crimes, misdemeanors, or malfeasance in office"	
New York	State Assembly (support of majority of the membership needed)	Court for the Trial of Impeachments made up of members of the Senate and the Court of Appeals. In gubernatorial and lieutenant gubernatorial impeachments, the lieutenant governor and the temporary president/majority leader of the Senate are prohibited from participating (two-thirds vote needed to convict)			None specified	Impeached judicial officers are suspended from their office until the judgement of the trial
North Carolina	House of Representatives (majority vote needed)	Senate (two-thirds vote needed to convict with a majority quorum)		Presiding officer of the Senate (most impeachments); Chief Justice of the Supreme Court (gubernatorial and lieutenant gubernatorial impeachments)	"Commission of a felony, a misdemeanor involving moral turpitude, malfeasance in office, or willful neglect of duty"	Impeached officials are suspended from their office until the judgement of the trial
North Dakota	House of Representatives (support of majority of the membership needed)	Senate (support of two-thirds of the membership needed for conviction)	"Governor and other state and judicial officers of the state, except municipal judges"		"Habitual drunkenness, crimes, corrupt conduct, or malfeasance or misdemeanor in office"	
Northern Mariana Islands (territory)	House of Representatives (two-thirds vote needed)	Senate (two-thirds vote needed to convict)	Governor, lieutenant governor, attorney general, justices and judges	no specified directive	"Treason, commission of a felony, corruption or neglect of duty" (governor and lieutenant governor); "Treason, commission of a felony or crime of moral turpitude, corruption, or neglect of duty" (attorney general); "Treason, conviction of a felony, corruption, neglect of duty or conviction of any crime involving moral turpitude" (justices and judges)	
Ohio	House of Representatives (support of majority of the membership needed)	Senate (two-thirds vote needed to convict)	"Governor, judges, and all state officers"		"Misdemeanor in office"	
Oklahoma	House of Representatives	Senate (two-thirds vote needed to convict)	Governor and "other elective state officers" (including the justices of the Supreme Court and judges of the Court of Criminal Appeals)	Chief justice of the Supreme Court (most impeachments) (in their absence or disqualification, an associate justice of the Supreme Court selected by the Senate is to preside); Presiding officer chosen from and by the Senate (impeachments of Supreme Court justices)	"Willful neglect of duty, corruption in office, habitual drunkenness, incompetency, or any offense involving moral turpitude while in office "	
Oregon	House (absolute two-thirds vote needed to impeach)	Senate (absolute two-thirds vote needed to convict)	statewide elected officials of the Executive Branch (the governor, attorney general, secretary of state, treasurer, commissioner of labor and industries)	chief justice of Supreme Court	"malfeasance or corrupt conduct in office, willful neglect of statutory or constitutional duty, or other felony or high crime"	
Pennsylvania	House	Senate (two-thirds vote needed to convict)	"Governor and all other civil officers"		"Misbehavior in office"	
Puerto Rico (territory)	House of Representatives (support of two-thirds of the membership needed to impeach)	Senate (support of three-fourths of the membership needed to convict)		Chief justice of the Supreme Court (gubernatorial impeachments)	"Treason, bribery, other felonies, and misdemeanors involving moral turpitude"	Judgement is limited to removal from office (no ability to bar future eligibility to hold office)
Rhode Island	House of Representatives(two-thirds vote needed to impeach governor; majority vote for all other officers)	Senate (support of two-thirds of the membership needed to convict)	"Governor and all other executive and judicial officers"	Chief or presiding justice of the Supreme Court (gubernatorial impeachments)	Incapacitation or guilt for "the commission of a felony or crime of moral turpitude, misfeasance, or malfeasance in office or found incapacitated" (elected officers); Incapacitation or guilt for "the commission of a felony or crime of moral turpitude, misfeasance or malfeasance in office or violation of the canons of judicial ethics" (judges)	Impeachment resolutions will not be considered by the House unless they are signed by a quarter of House members; impeached officers are suspended from office until the judgement of the trial is pronounced; judgement is limited to removal from office (no ability to bar future eligibility to hold office)
South Carolina	House of Representatives (support of two-thirds of the membership needed)	Senate (support of two-thirds of the membership needed to convict)	"Officials elected on a statewide basis, state judges, and such other state officers as may be designated by law"	Chief justice of the Supreme Court (gubernatorial impeachments) if the chief justice is disqualified, then the senior justice is to preside	"Serious crimes or serious misconduct in office"	Impeached officials are suspended from their office until the judgement of the trial is pronounced; judgement is limited to removal from office (no ability to bar future eligibility to hold office)
South Dakota	House of Representatives (support of majority of the membership needed)	Senate (support of two-thirds of the membership needed to convict)	"Governor and other state and judicial officers, except county judges, justices of the peace and police magistrates"	Lieutenant governor is prohibited from presiding over or participating in gubernatorial impeachment trials	"Drunkenness, crimes, corrupt conduct, or malfeasance or misdemeanor in office"	Impeached officials are suspended from their office until the judgement of the trial; South Carolina constitution's impeachment rules include a double jeopardy clause protecting any officer against being impeached twice for the same offense
Tennessee	House of Representatives	Senate (support of two-thirds of senators sworn-in to try the impeachment is needed to convict)	Governor, judges of Supreme Court, judges of the inferior courts, chancellors, attorneys for the state, treasurer, comptroller, and secretary of state	Chief justice of the Supreme Court (most impeachments); Senior associate judge of the Supreme Court (impeachments of the chief justice of the Supreme Court)	Committing of "any crime in their official capacity which may require disqualification"	Trial to be prosecuted by three impeachment managers elected by and from the House; the General Assembly has the authority to remove any disqualification from holding office that was placed on an individual through a past impeachment judgement; the Legislature has the authority to initiate similar removal proceedings against justices of the peace, and other civil officers not eligible for impeachment, with removal/disqualification trial to take place in any "court" which the Legislature directs (such trials effectively amount to impeachment, but unlike impeachment are also allowed to enforce "other punishment as may be prescribed by law"
Texas	House of Representatives	Senate (two-thirds vote needed to convict)	Governor, lieutenant governor, attorney general, land commissioner, comptroller and judges		None specified	Impeached officials are suspended from their office until the judgement of the trial; Texas Constitution enables the Legislature to pass laws allowing for removal trials for officers that are not eligible for impeachment; with two-thirds approval from each chamber of the Legislature; the governor can remove judges for "wilful neglect of duty, incompetency, habitual drunkenness, oppression in office, or other reasonable cause which shall not be sufficient ground for impeachment" with the judges to be able to defend themselves in hearing before the Legislature votes
United States Virgin Islands (territory)	(no impeachment clause)					
Utah	House of Representatives (support of two-thirds of the membership needed)	Senate (support of two-thirds of the membership needed to convict)	"Governor and other state and judicial officers"	Chief justice of the Utah Supreme Court (gubernatorial impeachments) in the case that they are disqualified or unable to act, Senate is to select another Supreme Court justice to preside	"High crimes, misdemeanors, or malfeasance in office"	Impeached judicial officers are suspended from their office until the judgement of the trial with temporary replacements to be appointed by governor and confirmed by the Senate
Vermont	House of Representatives (support of two-thirds needed)	Senate (two-thirds vote needed to convict)	"Every officer of State, whether judicial or executive"; "state criminals"		Maladministration	
Virginia	House of Delegates	Senate (two-thirds vote needed to convict)	Governor, lieutenant governor, attorney general, judges, members of the State Corporation Commission, and all officers appointed by the governor or elected by the General Assembly		"Offending against the Commonwealth by malfeasance in office, corruption, neglect of duty, or other high crime or misdemeanor"	
Washington	House of Representatives (support of majority of the membership needed)	Senate (support of two-thirds of the membership needed to convict)	"Governor and other state and judicial officers, except judges and justices of courts not of record	Chief justice of the Supreme Court (gubernatorial and lieutenant gubernatorial impeachments)	"High crimes or misdemeanors, or malfeasance in office"	
West Virginia	House of Delegates	Senate (two-thirds vote needed to convict)	Any "officer of the state"	President of the West Virginia Supreme Court of Appeals	"Maladministration, corruption, incompetency, gross immorality, neglect of duty, or any high crime or misdemeanor"	
Wisconsin	State Assembly (support of majority of the membership needed)	Senate (two-thirds vote needed to convict)	"All civil officers"	For gubernatorial impeachments, lieutenant governor is prohibited from participating/presiding	"Corrupt conduct in office, crimes and misdemeanors"	Judicial officers are suspended from their office until judgement of the trial
Wyoming	House of Representatives (support of majority of the membership needed)	Senate (support of two-thirds of the membership needed to convict)	"Governor and other state and judicial officers except justices of the peace"	Chief justice of the Supreme Court (gubernatorial impeachments)	"High crimes and misdemeanors, or malfeasance in office"	
State/territory/fed. district	Body which impeaches	Body which holds trial/convicts	Offices subject to impeachment by state/territorial government	Presiding officer specifications for trials	Specified reasons for which officials can be impeached	Notes

== Officials impeached by state and territorial governments ==
There have been in excess of 140 impeachments of officials by state governments.

Offices that have been the subject of impeachments include:

- governors (22 impeachments –20 of state governors, 2 of territorial governors) (Note: For governors who were subject to multiple impeachments, these totals count each instance of impeachment as separate. These totals also count both impeachments of Oklahoma governor Henry S. Johnston, the first of which was judged by the Oklahoma Senate to be void due to state court decisions holding that the House had not properly convened when it voted to impeach)
- lieutenant governor (1 impeachment)
- attorneys general (7 impeachments) (Note: includes the impeachment of former Nebraska Attorney General William Leese, which was ruled invalid by a court)
- state treasurers (8 impeachments) (Note: includes the impeachment of former Nebraska Treasurer John E. Hill, which was ruled invalid by a court)
- state auditors (5 impeachments) (Note: includes the impeachment of former Nebraska State Auditor Thomas H. Benton, which was ruled invalid by a court)
- secretaries of state (4 impeachment)
- state insurance commissioners (4 impeachments)
- judges and justices (63 impeachments) (Note: Includes the impeachment of Oklahoma Supreme Court Chief Justice Fred P. Branson in 1927, which was judged by the Oklahoma Senate to be void due to state court decisions holding that the House had not properly convened when it voted to impeach)
- county sheriffs (5 impeachments)
- justices of the peace (2 impeachments)
- surveyors (2 impeachments)
- commissioners of agriculture (2 impeachment) (Note: Includes the impeachment of Oklahoma Commissioner Agriculture Harry Cordell in 1927, which was judged by the Oklahoma Senate to be void due to state court decisions holding that the House had not properly convened when it voted to impeach)
- commissioners of public lands (1 impeachment)
- comptrollers (1 impeachment)
- recorders of deeds (1 impeachment)
- judicial masters (1 impeachment)
- tax collectors (1 impeachment)
- treasurers of sub-divisions (1 impeachment)
- court clerks (1 impeachment)
- state printer (1 impeachment)
- state civil service commission members (2 impeachments)
- state corporation commission members (1 impeachment)
- executive council members (1 impeachment)
- waterway commission members (1 impeachment)

Date	State	Accused	Office	Result
December 8, 1780	Pennsylvania	Francis Hopkinson	judge of the Court of Admiralty	Not removed (acquitted on December 26, 1780)
June 17, 1790	New Hampshire	Woodbury Langdon	justice of the Superior Court	Resigned
1791	Georgia	Henry Osborne	judge of the Superior Court	Removed
1791	South Carolina	William Davis	collector of taxes	Resigned (in 1793)
1792	South Carolina	Alexander Moultrie	attorney general	Removed (found guilty in 1893), disqualified from holding office for 7 years
April 5, 1793	Pennsylvania	John Nicholson	comptroller general	Not removed (acquitted in April 22, 1794)
December 17, 1798	Tennessee	David Campbell	judge of the Superior Court	Not removed (acquitted)
October 1799	Vermont	William Coley	high sheriff of Bennington County	Not removed; the General Assembly acted beyond its authority and ruled that the impeachment invalid; and no trial was subsequently held before the Governor and Council.
1800	Vermont	John Chipman	sheriff of Addison County	Not removed; while impeachment orders were brought by the Council of Censors, the General Assembly resolved not to prosecute the impeachment
1800	Vermont	Prince Hall	sheriff of Franklin County	Not removed; while impeachment orders were brought by the Council of Censors, the General Assembly resolved not to prosecute the impeachment
1802	Pennsylvania	Alexander Addison	District judge	Removed in January 1803
1803	Kentucky	Thomas Jones	surveyor of Bourbon County	Resigned during trial; trial was continued and Jones was convicted and disqualified from holding office
September 28, 1803	Tennessee	David Campbell	justice of the Superior Court	Not removed (acquitted on October 6, 1803)
March 23, 1804	Pennsylvania	Thomas Smith	associate justice of the Supreme Court	Not removed (acquitted on January 28, 1805)
March 23, 1804	Pennsylvania	Edward Shippen IV	chief justice of the Supreme Court	Not removed (acquitted on January 28, 1805)
March 23, 1804	Pennsylvania	Jasper Yeates	associate justice of the Supreme Court	Not removed (acquitted on January 28, 1805)
February 22, 1805	Ohio	William W. Irvin	associate judge of the Court of Common Pleas of Fairfield County	Removed on January 11, 1806
1806	South Carolina	Daniel D'Oyley	treasurer of the Lower Division	Removed (found guilty in 1807), disqualified from holding office for 5 years
September 3, 1806	Tennessee	John Philips	justice of the peace for Robertson County	Not removed (acquitted on October 24, 1807)
September 3, 1806	Tennessee	Isaac Philips	justice of the peace for Robertson County	Removed on October 24, 1807 and disqualified from holding state office for a period of two years
1807	Pennsylvania	Thomas McKean	governor	Not removed; no trial held and the impeachment was abandoned
December 24, 1808	Ohio	Calvin Pease	judge of the Third Circuit Court	Not removed (acquitted in February 1809)
December 24, 1808	Ohio	George Tod	associate justice of the Supreme Court	Not removed (acquitted on January 20, 1809)
December 7, 1810	South Carolina	John Clark	sheriff for Laurens District	convicted (Note: Clark's term had expired before the conclusion of his trial, so he was no longer in office at the time the impeachment trial verdict was delivered) (on December 12, 1812) and disqualified for 4 years from holding state office
December 14, 1810	South Carolina	William Hassell Gibbes	master in equity for Charleston	not removed (acquitted on December 16, 1811)
November 7, 1811	Tennessee	William Cocke	judge of the First Circuit Court of Tennessee	Removed on October 10, 1812
December 6, 1813	South Carolina	Matthew O'Driscoll	ordinary, clerk of court, and register for Colleton District	Removed from office (held guilty on December 21, 1813)
March 1817	Pennsylvania	Thomas Clark	associate judge of the Court of Common Pleas of Lancaster County	Not removed (acquitted on March 18, 1817)
March 1817	Pennsylvania	Walter Franklin	president judge of the Court of Common Pleas of Lancaster County	Not removed (acquitted on March 18, 1817)
March 1817	Pennsylvania	Jacob Hibshman	associate judge of the Court of Common Pleas of Lancaster County	Not removed (acquitted on March 18, 1817)
November 3, 1821	Tennessee	Samuel H. Williams	surveyor general of the Seventh District	Removed on August 10, 1822
April 9, 1825	Pennsylvania	Walter Franklin	president judge of the Court of Common Pleas of the Second Judicial District (Lancaster and York counties)	Not removed (acquitted on April 7, 1825)
April 11, 1825	Pennsylvania	Seth Chapman	judge of the Eighth Judicial District	Not removed (acquitted on February 18, 1826)
April 11, 1825	Pennsylvania	Robert Porter	president judge of the Third Judicial District	Not removed (acquitted on December 31, 1825)
October 27, 1829	Tennessee	Nathaniel W. Williams	judge of Circuit Court	Removed on December 22, 1829
December 24, 1829	Tennessee	Joshua Haskell	judge of the Eighth Circuit Court	Not removed (acquitted on November 30, 1831)
1832	Illinois	Theophilus W. Smith	associate justice of the Supreme Court	Not removed (acquitted)
1853	Wisconsin	Levi Hubbell	judge of the Second Judicial Circuit	Not removed (acquitted)
1853	New York	John C. Mather	member of the Canal Commission	Not removed (acquitted)
February 9, 1857	California	Henry Bates	state treasurer	Found guilty in impeachment trial on March 11, 1857, resigned before this sentence was formally entered. Was convicted and disqualified from holding state office.
February 26, 1862	Kansas	Charles L. Robinson	governor	Not removed (acquitted)
February 26, 1862	Kansas	John Winter Robinson	secretary of state	Removed on June 12, 1862
February 26, 1862	Kansas	George S. Hillyer	state auditor	Removed on June 16, 1862
March 26, 1862	California	James H. Hardy	district judge for the Sixteenth Judicial District	Removed (convicted)
1865	New York	George W. Smith	judge in Oneida County	Not removed (acquitted)
February 11, 1867	Tennessee	Thomas N. Frazier	judge	Removed and disqualified from holding state office
1868	New York	Robert C. Dorn	member of the Canal Commission	not removed (acquitted on June 13, 1868)
1868	Florida	Harrison Reed	governor	Originally removed; removal overturned by Florida Supreme Court
1870	Florida	James T. Magbee	judge of the Sixth Circuit Court	not removed; impeachment proceedings abandoned without a verdict.
December 14, 1870	North Carolina	William Woods Holden	governor	Removed on March 22, 1871
1871	Nebraska	David Butler	governor	Removed
March 30, 1871	Texas	William H. Russell	judge of the Fifteenth Judicial District	Not removed
December 1, 1871	Texas	J. W. Oliver	judge of the Thirty-third Judicial District	Not removed; the Texas House voted to impeach, but did not submit articles of impeachment to the Texas Senate. No trial was held.
1871	Arkansas	Powell Clayton	governor	Not removed; trial never held
1871	New York	Horace G. Prindle	judge and surrogate of Chenango County	Not removed (acquitted)
February 1872	Florida	Harrison Reed	governor	Not removed
March 1872	New York	George G. Barnard	judge of the Supreme Court (1st District)	Removed
March 22, 1872	Michigan	Charles A. Edmonds	commissioner of the Michigan Land Office	Not removed (acquitted in May 1872)
1872	Louisiana	Henry C. Warmoth	governor	"Suspended from office" for remainder of term, trial was never held
1872	New York	John H. McCunn	justice of the Superior Court of the City of New York	Removed
1873	Arkansas	John McClure	Chief justice of the Supreme Court	Not removed (acquitted)
March 1873	Minnesota	William Seeger	state treasurer	Resigned; was tried and convicted thereafter
April 1873	Texas	John G. Scott	judge of the Tenth Judicial District	Not Removed; Senate court of impeachment adjourned on February 5, 1874 without having reached a verdict.
1873	Texas	William M. Chambers	judge of the First Judicial District	Not removed (acquitted)
March 2, 1874	Kansas	Josiah Hayes	state treasurer	resigned on May 12, 1874; impeachment proceedings abandoned thereafter
1874	New York	George M. Curtis	justice of the Marine Court of the City of New York	not removed (acquitted)
1875	West Virginia	John Burdette	state treasurer	removed (found guilty)
January 1876	Mississippi	Adelbert Ames	governor	resigned; impeachment proceedings thereafter dropped
January 1876	Mississippi	Alexander Kelso Davis	lieutenant governor	removed (found guilty in March 1876)
February 17, 1876	Mississippi	Thomas Cardozo	state superintendent of education	resigned on March 22, 1876; impeachment proceedings thereafter dismissed
February 28, 1876	Louisiana	William Pitt Kellogg	governor	not removed (acquitted)
1878	Minnesota	Sherman Page	judge of the Tenth Judicial District	not removed (acquitted)
1881	Minnesota	Eugene Saint Julien Cox	judge of the Ninth Judicial District	Removed in March 1882
April 9, 1886	Iowa	John L. Brown	auditor of state	Not removed (acquitted on July 13, 1886)
1887	Texas	Frank Willis	judge of the Thirty-First Judicial District	Not Removed (acquitted)
1888	Kentucky	James W. Tate	state treasurer	Removed
February 27, 1891	Kansas	Theodosius Betkin	judge of the Thirty-Second Judicial District	Not removed, acquitted
April 1893	Nebraska	John E. Hill	former State Treasurer	proceedings abandoned after court ruled (Note: court held that former offiicals are not civil officers in the meaning of the Nebraska Constitution) impeachment invalid
April 1893	Nebraska	Thomas H. Benton	former Auditor of Public Accounts	proceedings abandoned after court ruled impeachment invalid
1893	Nebraska	William Leese	former Attorney General	proceedings abandoned after court ruled (Note: court held that Leese, who had been out of office for more than tow years, could not be impeached for a misdemeanor he might have committed while in office) impeachment invalid
1893	Texas	William L. McGaughey	Commissioner of the General Land Office	Not Removed (acquitted on May 5, 1893)
1901	North Carolina	David M. Furches	chief justice of the Supreme Court	Not removed (acquitted)
1901	North Carolina	Robert M. Douglas	associate justice of the Supreme Court	Not removed (acquitted)
January 24, 1903	Montana	Edward W. Harney	judge of the Second Judicial District of Silver Bow County	not removed
June 25, 1909	Washington	J. H. Schively	state insurance commissioner	Not removed (acquitted August 26, 1909)
June 25, 1909	Kentucky	J. E. Williams	McCreary County judge	Not removed (acquitted)
1911	North Dakota	John F. Cowan	judge of the Second Judicial District of North Dakota	Not removed (acquitted)
1913	Oklahoma	Giles W. Farris	state printer	Removed (found guilty on February 26, 1913)
1913	Oklahoma	P. A. Ballard	state insurance commissioner	Resigned on April 29, 1913
August 13, 1913	New York	William Sulzer	governor	Removed on October 17, 1913
1915	Oklahoma	A. P. Watson	member of the Corporation Commission	Removed (found guilty on April 23, 1915)
July 1917	Texas	James E. Ferguson	governor	Resigned. Convicted and disqualified from holding office after resigning
1918	Montana	Charles L. Crum	judge of the Fifteenth Judicial District	Removed (found guilty on March 22, 1918, had earlier offered his resignation on March 19, 1918); was posthumously "exonerated from wrongful impeachment" by a vote of the Montana Senate in 1991
October 23, 1923	Oklahoma	John C. Walton	governor	Removed (found guilty on 11 of the articles of impeachment on November 21, 1932; had already been suspended pending the outcome)
1927	West Virginia	John C. Bond	state auditor	Resigned on March 15, 1927, no trial held
1927	Montana	T. C. Stewart	secretary of state	Removed
December 12, 1927 (Note: The impeachment votes (cast December 12, 1927) were judged by state courts and later the Senate to have not been held lawfully)	Oklahoma	Henry S. Johnston	governor	not removed (validity of impeachment vote challenged in courts; on December 29, Senate deemed impeachment void)
December 12, 1927	Oklahoma	Fred P. Branson	chief justice of the Supreme Court	not removed (on December 29, Senate deemed the impeachment void)
December 12, 1927	Oklahoma	Harry Cordell	commissioner of agriculture	not removed (validity of impeachment vote challenged in courts; on December 29, Senate deemed void)
1928	Massachusetts	Arthur Kenneth Reading	attorney general	Resigned
January 21, 1929	Oklahoma	Henry S. Johnston	governor	Removed (held guilty on March 20, 1929)
March 23, 1929	Oklahoma	Charles W. Mason	chief justice of the Supreme Court	Not removed (acquitted)
March 1929	Oklahoma	James Waddey Clark	associate justice of the Supreme Court	Not removed (acquitted on May 11, 1929)
March 1929	Oklahoma	Fletcher Riley	associate justice of the Supreme Court	Not removed (articles of impeachment dismissed by senate)
1929	California	Carlos S. Hardy	data-sort-value=judge--xx |judge of the Superior Court of Los Angeles County	Not removed (acquitted April 26, 1929)
April 6, 1929	Louisiana	Huey Long	governor	Not removed
March 17, 1931	Missouri	Larry Brunk	state treasurer	Not removed, acquitted
1931	Texas	J. B. Price	judge of the Twenty-First Judicial District	Not Removed
1933	Kansas	Roland Boynton	attorney general	Not removed, acquitted
1933	Kansas	Will J. French	state auditor	Not removed, acquitted
1935	North Dakota	Thomas H. Moodie	governor	Impeachment proceedings halted after North Dakota Supreme Court took a case challenging Moodie's qualification to hold office. Court ultimately removed Moodie as unqualified for office
1935	Colorado	James H. Carr	secretary of state	Resigned (trial never held) (Note: Carr resigned before any trial had begun, and the House thereafter voted to abandon the impeachment process)
May 1939	Colorado	Herman Getty	civil service commissioner	Not removed (acquitted)
May 1939	Colorado	Clara Wilkins	civil service commissioner	Not removed (acquitted)
June 13, 1941	Massachusetts	Daniel H. Coakley	member of the Governor's Council	Removed on October 2, 1941
1943	Michigan	Michael E. Nolan	Probate judge of Gogebic County	Removed
1957	Florida	George Holt	judge of the circuit court	Not removed (acquitted)
May 1958	Tennessee	Raulston Schoolfield	judge of the criminal court of Hamilton County	Removed on July 11, 1958
1963	Florida	Richard Kelly	judge of circuit court	Not removed (acquitted)
1965	Oklahoma	Napoleon B. Johnson	justice of the Supreme Court	Removed (found guilty)
1975	Texas	O.P. Carillo	district judge of Duval County	Removed
1975	Florida	Thomas D. O'Malley	state insurance commissioner	Resigned, articles of impeachment thereafter dismissed
1976	Vermont	Mike Mayo	sheriff of Washington County, Vermont	Not removed, acquitted in impeachment trial
March 14, 1984	Nebraska	Paul L. Douglas	attorney general	Not removed (acquitted by the Nebraska Supreme Court on May 4, 1984)
February 6, 1988	Arizona	Evan Mecham	governor	Removed on April 4, 1988
March 30, 1989	West Virginia	A. James Manchin	state treasurer	Resigned on July 9, 1989, before trial started
January 25, 1991	Kentucky	Ward "Butch" Burnette	commissioner of agriculture	Resigned on February 6, 1991, before trial started. Afterwards, the Senate and then House adopted resolutions to terminate the impeachment proceedings.
May 24, 1994	Pennsylvania	Rolf Larsen	associate justice of the Supreme Court	Removed on October 4, 1994, and declared ineligible to hold public office in Pennsylvania
October 6, 1994	Missouri	Judith Moriarty	secretary of state	Removed by the Missouri Supreme Court on December 12, 1994
July 12, 2000	New Hampshire	David Brock	chief justice of the Supreme Court	Not removed (acquitted on October 11, 2000)
September 9, 2004	Oklahoma	Carroll Fisher	state insurance commissioner	Resigned on September 24, 2004
November 11, 2004	Nevada	Kathy Augustine	State Controller	Not removed; censured on December 4, 2004
April 11, 2006	Nebraska	David Hergert	Member of the University of Nebraska Board of Regents	Removed by the Nebraska Supreme Court on July 7, 2006
January 8, 2009 (first vote)	Illinois	Rod Blagojevich	governor	Not removed, 95th General Assembly ended before a trial could be held, and the 96th General Assembly opted to hold a new impeachment vote (Note: Blagojevich's first impeachment vote was held as one of the last actions of a lame duck session of the House of the 95th Illinois Assembly. It was out of precaution that this resolution was not acted upon by the Senate of the 96th Illinois Assembly. There was belief that Blagojevich might, as a last-ditch legal argument to challenge removal, attempt to argue that (similar to partially-adopted legislation) an impeachment resolution that had not yet been tried by the senate would be rendered void at the expiration of the Assembly term. To preclude Blagojevich's ability to attempt this hypothetical legal challenge, the newly-seated House of the 96th assembly instead passed a new resolution (containing a single article of impeachment with thirteen subparts) for the Senate to instead try Blagojevich upon.)
January 14, 2009 (second vote)	Illinois	Rod Blagojevich	governor	Removed on January 29, 2009, and declared ineligible to hold public office in Illinois
February 11, 2013	Northern Mariana Islands	Benigno Fitial	governor	Resigned on February 20, 2013
August 13, 2018	West Virginia	Robin Davis	associate justice of the Supreme Court of Appeals	Retired on August 13, 2018.
August 13, 2018	West Virginia	Allen Loughry	associate justice of the Supreme Court of Appeals	Resigned on November 12, 2018.
August 13, 2018	West Virginia	Beth Walker	associate justice of the Supreme Court of Appeals	Not removed; reprimanded and censured on October 2, 2018
August 13, 2018	West Virginia	Margaret Workman	chief justice of the Supreme Court of Appeals	Retired on December 31, 2020.
January 12, 2022	Northern Mariana Islands	Ralph Torres	governor	Not removed (acquitted May 18, 2022)
April 12, 2022	South Dakota	Jason Ravnsborg	attorney general	Removed on June 21, 2022 and declared ineligible to hold office in South Dakota
November 16, 2022	Pennsylvania	Larry Krasner	District attorney of Philadelphia	Not tried; State Senate voted on January 11, 2023 to indefinitely postpone the trial. On September 26, 2024, the Supreme Court of Pennsylvania ruled that the articles of impeachment against Krasner had expired when the 2021-2022 legislative session expired.
May 27, 2023	Texas	Ken Paxton	attorney general	Not removed (acquitted September 16, 2023); was suspended while awaiting verdict

=== Gubernatorial impeachment ===
Impeachment and removal of governors has happened occasionally throughout the history of the United States, usually for corruption charges. At least eleven U.S. state governors have faced an impeachment trial; a twelfth, Governor Lee Cruce of Oklahoma, escaped impeachment by one vote in 1912. Several others, including Missouri's Eric Greitens in 2018, have resigned rather than face impeachment, when events seemed to make it inevitable. The most recent impeachment of a state governor occurred on January 14, 2009, when the Illinois House of Representatives voted 117–1 to impeach Rod Blagojevich on corruption charges; he was subsequently removed from office and barred from holding future office by the Illinois Senate on January 29.

There have been twenty-one impeachments of state governors (with one state governor having been thrice impeached, and two state governors having been twice impeached):

- Charles L. Robinson (Republican governor of Kansas) in 1862
- Harrison Reed (Republican governor of Florida)
  - In 1868 —originally removed; removal overturned by Florida Supreme Court
  - In 1872
- William Woods Holden (Republican governor of North Carolina) in 1870 —removed in 1871
- Powell Clayton (Republican governor of Arkansas) in 1871
- David Butler (Republican governor of Nebraska) in 1871 —removed
- Henry Warmoth (Republican governor of Louisiana) in 1872
- William Pitt Kellogg (Republican governor of Louisiana) in 1876
- Adelbert Ames (Republican governor of Mississippi) in 1876
- William Sulzer (Democratic governor of New York) in 1913 (impeached for false report, perjury, and suborning perjury) —removed
- James E. Ferguson (Democratic governor of Texas) in 1917 –convicted after first having resigned
- Jack C. Walton (Democratic governor of Oklahoma) in 1923 (impeached for a variety of crimes including illegal collection of campaign funds, padding the public payroll, suspension of habeas corpus, excessive use of the pardon power, and general incompetence. In November 1923, Walton was convicted and removed from office) —removed
- Henry S. Johnston (Democratic governor of Oklahoma) impeached thrice (in 1927 and 1929) -removed (2nd impeachment)
- Huey Long (Democratic governor of Louisiana) in 1929
- Thomas H. Moodie (Democratic governor of North Dakota) in 1935
- Evan Mecham (Republican governor of Arizona) in 1988 (impeached for obstruction of justice and misusing government funds) —removed
- Rod Blagojevich (Democratic governor of Illinois) impeached twice in 2009 (impeached for abuse of power and corruption, including an attempt to sell the appointment to the United States Senate seat vacated by the resignation of Barack Obama) —removed (2nd impeachment)

In addition to the aforementioned state governors, two governors of the Northern Mariana Islands territory have been impeached: Republican Benigno Fitial in 2013 (who resigned) and Republican Ralph Torres in 2022 (who was acquitted).

The National Conference of State Legislatures has observed that gubernatorial impeachment occurs relatively infrequently and has cited two factors it believed to be partially responsible for this:

- "Impeachment is regarded as a power to be used only in extreme cases"
- "Individuals frequently resign before the impeachment proceedings begin or are completed"

== See also ==
- Impeachment in the United States
- Federal impeachment in the United States
- Impeachment in the Thirteen Colonies
- Impeachment inquiry in the United States
