= Impeachment in Vermont =

Political process in Vermont

In the United States state of Vermont, the practice of impeachment has existed since its pre-statehood era as the Vermont Republic and has continued into its existence as a state since 1791. Impeachment allows a legislative body to remove an official from office after a trial.

Over the course of Vermont's pre-statehood history, the term "impeachment" was used to describe a broad variety of actions, including, at times, the removal of legislators. This inconsistency over the history of Vermont as to what constitutes an "impeachment" has complicated historians' efforts to fully document the history of impeachment in Vermont.

== Republic-era impeachment laws ==
The 1777 Constitution of the Vermont Republic gave both the Council of Censors and the Vermont General Assembly the power to impeach by a simple majority vote. The Council of Censors were empowered to impeach any state officer, while the General Assembly's impeachment powers were limited to county officers such as justices of the peace, sheriffs, and county judges. The Governor's Council and the governor or lieutenant governor ("Governor and Council") would together hear the impeachment trial and issue a judgement as to whether the impeached officer was to be removed. This court of impeachment could bring judges of the Supreme Court to sit as advisors to them. The constitution specified that, "Every officer of State, whether judicial or executive, shall be liable to be impeached by the General Assembly, either when in office, or after his resignation, or removal for mal-administration".

The 1786 Vermont Constitution, which amended the previous one, removed the ability of the General Assembly to impeach, meaning that the Council of Censors had the sole authority to impeach officers. It also saw the impeachment clause amended to allow "awarding of costs" to be a consequence of an impeachment ruling.

== Republic-era impeachments and related proceedings ==
=== Expulsion of John Abbot and Daniel Martin (representatives) in 1781 ===
On June 28, 1781, John Abbot and Daniel Martin, both members of the General Assembly, were "impeached" and removed from office. While this was termed an "impeachment", the entire process occurred in only one legislative chamber, the General Assembly. This was despite the Republic's constitution requiring that impeachments be tried before the Council of Censors and the governor or lieutenant governor. A more accurate descriptor by modern standards would perhaps be "expulsion" and "reprimand". Martin's removal ended later that day, as he was restored to his seat after showing "sorrow and repentance" before the General Assembly. Abbot was a representative from the town of Hoosack and Martin was a representative from the town of Putney. The impeachment resolution alleged that Martin had sold Abbott discounted Vermont bills of credit at one-fourth their face value in exchange for hard currency. This action took place during a financial crisis in Vermont.

=== John Barrett (Windsor County justice of the peace) in 1783–1785 ===
On October 16, 1783, the General Assembly received a petition from residents of Springfield requesting John Barrett (alternatively spelled Barret), justice of the peace of Windsor County be impeached for maladministration. Several complaints had already been received by the General Assembly by individuals that had received judgement and writs from Barrett in 1781. Action was not immediately taken by the legislature, however, and the impeachment process would ultimately last until 1785.

On March 2, 1784, the General Assembly moved to issue an impeachment order against Berrett for maladministration in effect, "virtually suspends him from officiating in his office of justice of the peace" and ordering that Stephen R. Bradley act as prosecutor in the impeachment trial. On October 25, 1784, after receiving another petition in regards to Barrett, made a finding that "no impeachment was ever made before the Governor and Council in pursuance of said order" and that Barrett had never received official notice about the impeachment order, judging that Barrett was therefore not "virtually" suspended from "officiating in his said office." On October 27, 1784, the General Assembly authorized an impeachment and moved that Samuel Knight would also prosecute impeachment against Barrett. Knight and Stephen R. Bradley prosecuted in the impeachment trial.

On June 9, 1785, Bradley presented the charges against Barrett to the Governor and Council. Barrett defended himself, and plead not guilty. Barrett's impeachment charges alleged that he had, "excited and encouraged many needless & vexatious Law suits to enhance bills of Costs to the oppression of the People, to the great injury of the Common Weal and against the Peace and dignity of the freemen of the State of Vermont." One accusation that Bradley made was that Barrett had issued a judgement in a case that he knew had already been settled by its parties. Another allegation was that he issued a ruling in a case despite knowing that the defendant had been deceased for three years. On June 11, 1785, the Governor and Council found Barrett guilty of maladministration, suspending him from office for six months and ordering him to pay the expenses of the prosecution.

On Barrett's behalf, Stephen Jacob requested that the "cause of his impeachment before the Council" be reviewed. The Council, however, said such a review could not occur, "without order of the Legislature." On June 16, 1785, the General Assembly moved to authorize a new hearing before the Governor and Council. Additionally, Barret acknowledged that he owed fifty pounds of the debt to the State Treasurer to pay for the expenses of the prosecution of his first impeachment trial. The Governor and Council heard Barrett's impeachment for a second time on October 20 and 21, 1785. They again found him guilty of maladministration and again handed him a six-month suspension and ordered him to pay the expenses of the prosecution.

=== Matthew Lyon (clerk of the Court of Confiscation) in 1785 ===
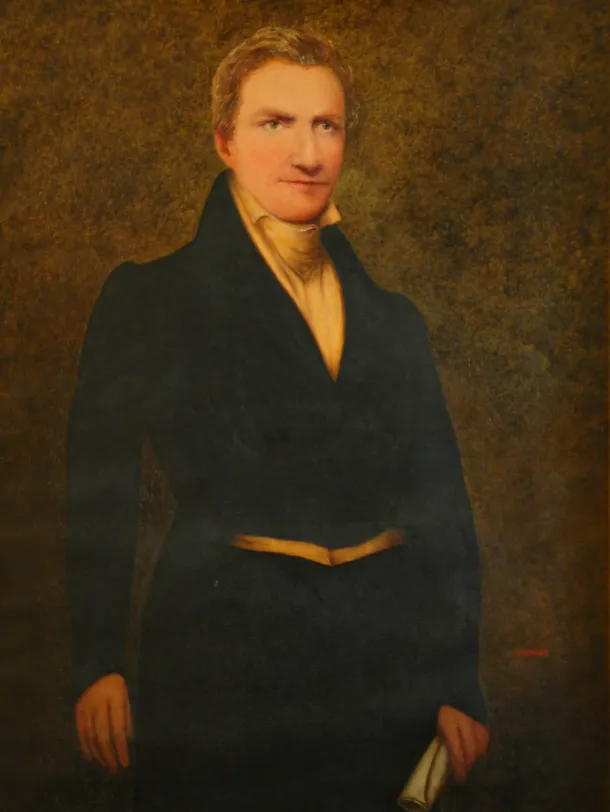
Portrait of Lyon

On October 15, 1785, Clerk of the Court of Confiscation Matthew Lyon was impeached for his failure to provide the state with records of the Court of Confiscation. The impeachment resolution also appointed three of the Court of Confiscation's members as impeachment managers. Three days later, after an impeachment trial before both the Governor and Council, Lyon was reprimanded and ordered by the court of impeachment to pay the expenses of the prosecution. It was additionally ordered by the court of impeachment that Lyon be fined 500 pounds if he failed to comply by delivering the documents. Lyon requested a new trial, and the Governor's Council obliged. This was despite having told John Barrett months earlier that they believed such a second trial could only be authorized by the General Assembly. In the new trial they again found against him. There are no records that suggest that Lyon paid any of the fines he was ordered to, however.

=== Expulsion of Jonathan Fassett (former representative) in 1787 ===
Similar to Abbot and Martin before him, Vermont General Assembly member Jonathan Fassett was handed an expulsion in an action that was referred to as an "impeachment".

Fassett had played a role in leading the November 1786 Rutland Court Riots in which a mob acted to prevent the Rutland County Court from sitting. On February 19, 1789 he was ordered by the General Assembly to be suspended pending consideration of a petition brought against him for this offense. After evidence was considered, the General Assembly suspended him and then on February 28, 1787 unanimously voted to expel him. The legislature also ordered him to pay the expenses of Rutland County State's Attorney Darius Chipman, who had prosecuted the case against him.

== Other Republic-era impeachment efforts ==
=== Matthew Lyon (representative) in 1779 ===
In 1779, an "impeachment" petition against Matthew Lyon, then the representative from Arlington, was filed by Reuben Jones, the representative from Rockingham. The two representatives had a dispute between them. The General Assembly quickly voted not to act on the petition.

=== Abner Osgood (justice of the peace) in 1785 ===
On October 20, 1785, Dr. Nathaniel Gott of Lunenburg filed a petition with the General Assembly requesting that they impeach Justice of Peace Abner Osgood (of Guildhall) for maladministration. This occurred around the time of the end of the Lyon and Barrett impeachment trials. The petition was sent to a committee of the legislature, which on October 27 reported their findings and recommended that Osgood come before the General Assembly at its next session to argue against grounds for impeachment. On September 7, 1786, Osgood petitioned for the General Assembly to delay such a hearing for another session due to the challenge of travel and limited time he would have to respond. The petition requesting an impeached was ultimately dismissed.

== Statehood-era impeachment laws ==
=== Historical ===
The pre-statehood Constitution of the Vermont Republic governed the state of Vermont until after the 1793 Vermont Constitutional Convention which amended the previous constitution. The 1793 Constitution of Vermont, however, did not change the impeachment language from what had been found in the 1786 constitution.

In 1836, the Constitution of Vermont's language was amended eliminating the Governor and Council and the authority to hold impeachment trials and issue verdicts was given to the Senate, with the Council of Censors continuing to hold the authority to impeach officials. The constitution was also amended to specify that the consequence of impeachment would not extend beyond removal from office and disqualification from holding office. Additionally, the Supreme Court justices' roles as advisers in impeachment trials was eliminated in 1836.

In 1870, the Council of Censors was abolished, with the power to impeach being given to the House of Representatives.

=== Modern laws ===
State impeachment in Vermont, like United States federal impeachment, is a two-step process in which its lower chamber (the House of Representatives) first impeaches an official and its upper chamber (the Senate) then holds an impeachment trial deciding whether to remove the official from office. An absolute two-thirds of members of the House need to concur to impeach an official, and a simple two-thirds state senators present must concur to convict. As the original 1777 constitution did, the current constitution specifies that "every officer of State, whether judicial or executive" is "liable to be impeached by the House of Representatives, either when in office or after resignation or removal for maladministration." The constitution has been read in analysis to mean that maladministration is the reason for which one can be impeached.

== Statehood-era impeachments ==
During Vermont's statehood, impeachment has been rarely-used. The most recent impeachment occurred in 1976.

=== William Coley (Bennington County high sheriff) in 1799 ===
In 1799, the Council of Censors adopted articles of impeachment against Bennington County High Sheriff William Coley for maladministration. On October 21, 1799 an order was sent by the Council of Censors to the General Assembly for them to prosecute the impeachment before them.

On October 26, 1779, after discussion, adopted measures to carry out this order. On October 30, the General Assembly voted both the accept the report of the Council of Censors and to establish a special committee with one member from each of the state's counties "to state the facts in detail and make a report to the house". On November 2, 1779 the committee reported to the full house its belief that the charges against Coley were "wholly unsupported". The General Assembly concurred with the committee and, acting beyond their authority, voted to rule that the impeachment invalid. The General Assembly effectively dismissed the charges. While this created a dispute between the House of Censors and the General Assembly, the impeachment was ultimately never tried. The House of Censors continued to hold that the General Assembly had no such authority to dismiss an impeachment.

=== John Chipman (Addison County sheriff) and Prince Hall (Franklin County sheriff) in 1800 ===
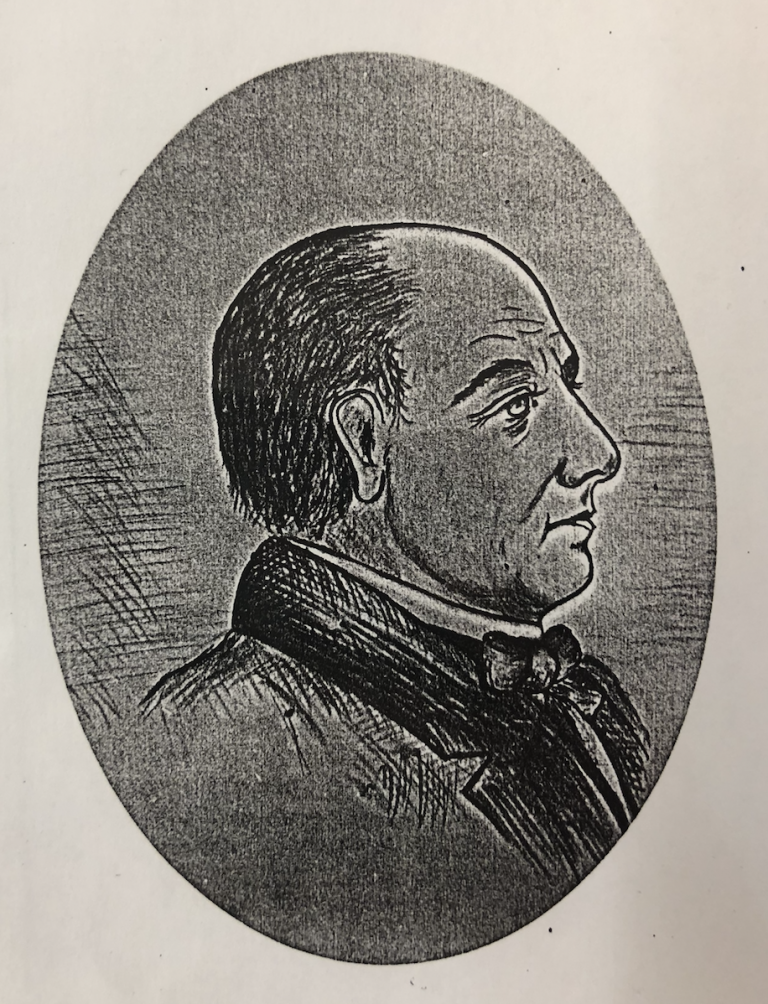
Portrait of Chipman

In 1800, the Council of Censors adopted impeachment orders against two sheriffs: Addison County Sheriff John Chipman and Franklin County Sheriff Prince Hall. The General assembly impeachment held inquiries into the charges, appointing a committee on October 16 to investigate the charges against Chipman and another on October 20 to investigate the charges against Hall.

The committee holding inquiry into Hall on October 22, 1800 proposed a resolution to dismiss the charges The resolution was rejected by a vote of 31–132. Stephen R. Bradley then offered a resolution to support an impeachment, which was tabled. On October 23, the General Assembly accepted reports from both committees arguing for the dismissal of charges. The Council of Censors had already let it be known after the General Assembly's earlier dismissal of the impeachment of William Coley that it did not believe that the General Assembly had the authority to dismiss impeachments. However, ignoring this argument, the General Assembly then resolved for their to be no other action on impeachment.

=== Mike Mayo (Washington County sheriff) in 1976 ===
Malcolm "Mike" Mayo, Washington County sheriff, was impeached in 1976. Mayo had faced allegations of questionable conduct, which drove the push for his impeachment.

On January 16, 1976, the House of Representatives voted to authorize the House Judiciary Committee to run an impeachment inquiry to see whether grounds existed to impeach Mayo. On January 30, 1976, the committee adopted rules for the inquiry. The state's commissioner of public safety was requested to provide them with an investigator. On February 4, 1976, former judge Don O'Brien was appointed to serve alongside legislative staff member William Russell as co-counsel for the committee's inquiry. Witnesses were subpoenaed. Much of the inquiry was conducted in closed session "in order to protect the sheriff and to prevent the premature hearing of the case by the Senate".

On March 4, 1976, the House Judiciary Committee took straw votes on possible impeachment articles, and on March 8 they rewrote the wording of the articles. On March 9, 1976, in a vote of 7–4, articles of impeachment were adopted.

In his impeachment trial before the Senate, Mayo was acquitted on the on all three articles of his impeachment. The third article came close to a conviction. The first two, resting on the testimony of two sheriff deputies whose credibility had been questioned, received fewer votes.

== Other statehood-era impeachment efforts ==
=== Lemuel Chipman (Rutland County assistant judge) in 1792 ===
A petition sent by Matthew Lyon was received by Council of Censors on October 11, 1792 calling for Rutland County Assistant Judge Lemuel Chipman to be impeached for maladministration. However, on October 13, 1792, the Council dismissed this petition, judging it to be a matter more appropriate for the General Assembly, finding it to be, "expedient that complaints of individual officers for offenses against the Constitution should be made in the first instance to the Gen'l Assembly." There is no record to suggest that Lyon subsequently petitioned the General Assembly on this matter.

At the time, Chipman's brother Nathaniel Chipman was counsel to the Council of Censors.

=== Leroy Null (Orleans County state's attorney) in 1980 ===
In December 1979, a grand jury approved an indictment of Orleans County State's Attorney Leroy Null. He was accused of having, while in office, destroyed official records and encouraged another individual to commit perjury. On January 18, 1980, H.R. 13 was introduced in the House to order that the House Judiciary Committee "investigate fully and completely whether sufficient grounds exist" to impeach Null.

House Appropriations Committee Chair Henry Carse expressed concern that the impeachment proceedings might complicate budget plans for Orleans County funding, so on January 22, 1980, the resolution was ordered to lay "on the table" until after the House first passed a supplemental appropriation bill. With the House disinterested in conducting a costly and lengthy impeachment inquiry, on February 15, 1980 it voted to withdraw the resolution. However, impeachment thereafter received new attention with another impeachment inquiry resolution, H.R. 18, being introduced on April 3, 1980 and passed on April 7. Null's, however, died on April 12, and H.R. 20 was passed on April 17, 1980 to formally end the impeachment inquiry.

=== Althea Kroger (Chittenden County assistant judge) in 1996 ===
In 1995, heated disagreement arose between Chittenden County Assistant Judges Elizabeth Gretkowski and Althea Kroger over disagreements about county administration and personal matters. The Vermont Assistant Judges Association (VAJA) got involved as a mediator and ultimately held hearings and investigation into whether either judge had committed violations of the law. Kroger filed a formal complaint against Gretkowski with the state's Judicial Conduct Board. On November 18, 1995 the VAJA sent a request to Kroger that she tender her resignation, which she refused to do. The matter was then referred to the Judicial Conduct Board who ultimately wrote papers to request that the legislature impeach Kroger for her conduct.

On January 24, 1996, Joint House Resolution No. 20 was passed ordering that the House Judiciary Committee conduct an impeachment inquiry, citing reasonable grounds to believe that Kroger had committed impeachable acts including perjury under oath and had made false allegations of wrongdoing against another county officer. The House Judiciary Committee conducted hearings, but took no further action.

Despite the lack of further impeachment action in the legislature, the matter continued to develop, as in October 1996 a four-member majority on the Judicial Conduct Board judged that "certain public statements made by [Kroger] were false, deceptive, and/or misleading." Due to lack of the requisite concurrence, no sanction was recommended by the board, however. The matter was then referred to the state's Supreme Court, and in March 1997 Kroger took a leave of absence from her office. In July 1997, in re:Kroger No. 96-495 the Vermont Supreme Court found that Kroger had given false statements under oath in testimony before VACJ hearings and suspended Kroger from her judgeship for a year. In December 1997, Kroger resigned. The court reprimanded Kroger on August 31, 1998.

=== John Grismore (Franklin County sheriff) and John Lavoie (Franklin County state's attorney), 2023–24 ===
In May 2023, Vermont House lawmakers initiated an impeachment process against Franklin County Sheriff John Grismore and Franklin County State's Attorney John Lavoie by launching an impeachment inquiry. The investigation into Grismore is focused on allegations that he had committed criminal assault by kicking a shackled prisoner as well as allegations of financial misconduct. The investigation into John Lavoie is focused on allegations of workplace harassment that include having made racist and sexist remarks to employees. The impeachment inquiry is being overseen by a seven-member special committee that was appointed by Speaker Jill Krowinski.

The investigation into Lavoie was halted in August 2023 after he resigned. It was decided by the committee that it would be against the best interest of the state to continue the investigation after his resignation. In April 2024, the lawmakers running the investigation reached a decision to decline to impeach Grismore, writing in their report that there was insufficient evidence that he had "improperly exceeded or abused the powers of his office". The panel, however, still adopted a resolution urged Grismore to resign from his office. One of the challenges that an impeachment against him would have faced was that there was little legal precedent for an impeachment on grounds related to pre-incumbency conduct (conduct committed by the subject prior to holding their office).

== See also ==
- Impeachment by state and territorial governments of the United States
- Impeachment in the United States
