= Impeachment in California =

In California, the process of impeachment has existed throughout its statehood allowing the State Legislature to remove certain officeholders. The State Assembly can initiate an impeachment, bringing about an impeachment trial in the State Senate through which an officeholder can be either suspended from office or removed from their office and disqualified from again holding state office.

== Impeachment law ==
=== History ===
Throughout its statehood, California has given its State Legislature the power to impeach officials. The California Constitution, as authored in 1849, empowered the State Assembly to impeach and the State Senate to try impeachments. As originally written, officials that could be impeached were the governor, lieutenant governor, attorney general, comptroller, secretary of state, surveyor general, treasurer, justices of the Supreme Court, and judges of the district courts.

Some impeachment rules have changed over the years. For instance, on February 10, 1857, amid the impeachment of Henry Bates, an act was adopted to allow for impeached officials to be suspended after their impeachment up until the end of their impeachment trial and for a temporary replacement to be appointed.

=== Current law ===
California's impeachment process outlined in the Constitution of California is two-step. A vote for impeachment in the State Assembly is followed by an impeachment trial in the State Senate. The Assembly has the power to start an impeachment, and the Senate has the power to convict an impeached officeholder thereby removing them from office with the option of additional barring them from holding office. The Senate can only convict if an absolute two-thirds of the body's members vote to do so. The punishment for impeachment extends no further than removal from office and disqualification from state office. However, impeached individuals still remain subject to any potential punishment through the criminal justice system. Under the constitution, the officials who can be impeached for misconduct from office are "state officers elected on a statewide basis, members of the State Board of Equalization, and judges of state courts".

California's impeachment process is further outlined in the California Government Code. It is specified that when the Senate sits as a court of impeachment, it is "a court of record and the officers of the Senate are the officers of the court." Impeachments originate through the adoption of an impeachment resolution originated and adopted in the Assembly. Once impeached, an official is suspended from their office until the verdict is delivered. In all cases except a gubernatorial impeachment, the vacancy left by such a suspension must temporarily be filled by a temporary officeholder appointed by the government with confirmation from the Senate. Such a temporary appointee will hold the office until the acquittal of the impeached official, or until (in the case of a conviction and removal) a new officeholder is chosen at the next election.

Impeachments trials are prosecuted by impeachment managers elected by the Assembly. The impeachment managers are tasked with preparing articles of impeachment which will then be presented at the bar of the Senate. The articles must also be presented to the president of the Senate. The charges in the articles are to be prosecuted by the impeachment managers.

The Senate is required to specify a date to hear the impeachment and provide notification to the Assembly. The Senate president is required to serve the defendant (impeached official) with a copy of the impeachment articles and with a notice to appear and answer at the time and location specified by the Senate. Such service must be made personally upon the defendant. If the defendant fails to appear, the Senate has the option to schedule another day for hearing or to proceed with the trial in the absence of the defendant. If the defendant appears, they have the option of objecting to the charges of the articles either in writing or by oral plea. If a defendant pleads guilty or refuses to plead, the Government Code says that the Senate is to convict him. If the defendant pleads that they are not guilty, the Senate is to proceed with an impeachment trial at a time which it chooses. Prior to the trial, the secretary of the Senate is to administer an oath to the members of the Senate that they will "truly and impartially hear, try, and determine the impeachment." Senators are prohibited from vote on the verdict or any other questions arising during the trial unless they have taken such an oath.

Reiterating what is specified in the constitution, the Government Code declares that an absolute two-thirds of senators must vote in support conviction in order for the defendant to be convicted. The Government Code further specifies that if the Senate does not reach support from an absolute two-thirds of its members for a conviction, the defendant will be acquitted. If the defendant is convicted, it is required that, at a time of its choosing, the Senate must pronounce the judgement through a resolution to be entered into the Senate Journal. Once such a resolution is adopted by a majority of members present that had previously voted on the question of conviction or acquittal, it formally will become the judgement of the Senate.

If the defendant is convicted, there are several options for punishment. The defendant could be removed from their office and disqualified thereafter from holding state office. The defendant could alternatively be merely suspended from their office, with no such disqualification. If suspended from office, the defendant will receive no salary, fees, or emoluments of the office for the duration of their suspension.

In the case of a lieutenant gubernatorial impeachment, the Senate must be given immediate notice so that they can elect a different president of the Senate.

== Impeachment of Henry Bates (state treasurer) in 1857 ==
California's first impeachment took place in 1857 when its state treasurer, Henry Bates, was impeached.

=== Investigations ===
In 1856, news surfaced of failure to pay interest on the state debt and rumors surfaced that there were irregularities in how state funds had been dealt with. In his January 7, 1857 message to the State Legislature, Governor J. Neely Johnson commented on this. The Legislature took quick action to investigate the matter, establishing five different committees to investigate the operations of the Treasury. Three of these were joint committees. In a letter he sent the State Legislature on January 1, 1857, treasurer Bates himself denied rumors of illegal payments being made to benefit outside interests and urged for the bodies to investigate the allegations.

One of the joint committees, which had been tasked with determining the total amount of coin and treasure in the Treasury issued its count on January 13, 1857. Most in the Assembly accepted the results of their count, though several prominent assemblymen questioning it.

On January 16, 1857, a joint committee was created to determine what total amount of revenue had been paid into the Treasury in 1857. It was to investigate how much was received in Controller's warrants. It was also to investigate whether Controller's warrants had been used as a substitute for cash, and if so who had done so and what authority had they used to justify such an action. This committee filed its report on February 11, 1857

On January 24, 1857, the Senate Committee on Public Expenditures released a report on the failure by Palmer, Cook, and Company to pay interest on state bonds that had been due on July 1, 1856. A concurrent resolution was passed in the Assembly and Senate to authorize each body's committees on public expenditures to form a joint committee to investigate the accounts of both the Controller and Treasurer, providing once-a-week reports to each chamber of the State Legislature.

A three-member select committee was appointed on January 17, 1857, primarily to investigate an alleged $124,000 withdrawal of funds from the general fund. This withdrawal was alleged to have been done to meet the upcoming July 1857 interest payment on state debt. The committee also was tasked with investigating the state's July 1, 1856 default on state bond interest payments and to provide a report of what steps the state had followed to recover the amount that had been withdrawn from the Treasury for such payments. The committee took testimony in its investigation. Its report was submitted on February 9, 1857.

=== Impeachment and resignation ===
After the select committee released its report on February 9, 1857, outrage was ignited and a resolution was quickly introduced in the Assembly to impeach Treasurer Bates for misdemeanors in office. However, the Assembly instead adopted a resolution allowing Bates to present written or oral arguments pertaining to the allegations levied against him by noon the next day. On February 10, Bates sent a response which attested to his innocence. He additionally requested being permitted to be represented with counsel and to be permitted a later date for more time to provide a more complete response. This response dissatisfied many in the Assembly, and Bates's request to provide a more complete response at a later date was denied. By the end of the day, the Assembly had unanimously by a vote of 61–0 adopted a resolution impeaching Bates for misdemeanors in office. An act was also adopted to allow for an official to be suspended after their impeachment until the end of their impeachment trial and for a temporary replacement to be appointed.

On February 11, a two-member committee of assemblymen informed the Senate of the impeachment action and declared that the Assembly, in due time, was to present the Senate with specific articles of impeachment. A committee of five assemblymen was established to serve as the impeachment managers, being tasked with authoring the articles of impeachment and subsequently prosecuting them before the Senate.

On February 11, 1857, Bates tendered his resignation to the governor, citing his inability to secure an increase in his official bond as had been demanded by district court. Governor Johnson immediately accepted the resignation and appointed a successor on February 13 who was immediately confirmed by the Senate. However, critics believed that this is not what should have been done, instead arguing that Bates should have been suspended pending the end of his impeachment proceedings and that Johnson should have made use of the recently passed act and instead made a temporary appointment for the duration of such a suspension.

=== Impeachment trial and conviction ===
Even with Bates' resignation, the Legislature continued with the impeachment proceedings against him. The Assembly adopted eleven articles of impeachment against him on February 16, 1857, and an additional three articles on February 18. Later on February 18, the impeachment committee presented the articles of impeachment to the Senate.

In advance of the trial, the Senate adopted rules for the proceedings and set March 5, 1857 as the start date for the trial. At the start of the trial, the president of the Senate was administered an oath by the secretary of the Senate. Thereafter, the president of the Senate swore-in all senators that were present. The president of the Senate then ordered that the sergeant-at-arms proclaim the High Court of Impeachment to be in session, and the sergeant-at-arms complied. The secretary thereafter informed the Assembly that the High Court of Impeachment was prepared to conduct the trial, at which point the impeachment managers entered the Senate chamber along with the state attorney general. Bates was then called to the bar of the Senate and was accompanied by a legal counsel of three.

In his answer, Bates' counsel challenged the jurisdiction of the High Court of Impeachment, arguing that Bates' designated had made him a private citizen rather than an officer of the state before the time that the specific articles of impeachment were adopted and the time that the Senate proceedings started. They also tried to argue that, since he had been handed two indictments by a grand jury for the same matter that was the subject of the impeachment, the impeachment proceedings would place Bates in double jeopardy. In response to this, the impeachment managers argued the following day that Bates had no grounds to challenge the Senate's jurisdiction. They noted that he not yet resigned as treasurer at the moment he was first impeached and that the cited indictments would have occurred after the articles of impeachment had already been presented to the Senate. They argued for the Senate to reject such a plea and compel Bates to answer to the articles of impeachment. The defense responded later that day with a plea claiming that the fact that several allegations in their initial answer that had not been challenged by the impeachment managers would sufficiently provide grounds to demonstrate a lack of jurisdiction. For the next three days, the two sides argued over jurisdiction and other legal questions.

Ultimately, as the High Court of impeachment, the Senate overruled Bates' objections to jurisdiction on March 11, and ordered him to answer to the articles of impeachment the next day. Still protesting jurisdiction and disagreeing with the adequacy of the articles of impeachment brought against him, Bates refused to enter such as plea. In a secret session, the Senate voted 32–1 to find Bates guilty. A judgement of the Court was authored which ruled that he should forever be disqualified from holding state office in California. This judgement was adopted in a 30–3 vote, then in open session was formally declared and adopted again, this time in a unanimous vote.

The judgement in Bates' trial set precedent that a last-minute resignation would not be sufficient grounds for an official subject to an impeachment to escape the Senate's jurisdiction as a High Court of Impeachment. It also set precedent that Senate jurisdiction would begin once the Senate is notified by the Assembly of the adoption of an impeachment resolution, regardless of whether formal articles of impeachment had yet to be authored. It also set the precedent that a criminal indictment does not prevent impeachment proceedings arising from the same accusations.

== Impeachment of James H. Hardy (district judge Sixteenth Judicial District) in 1862 ==
In 1862, Sixteen Judicial District Judge James H. Hardy was impeached and removed from office. Hardy had been appointed to his judgeship in 1852 by Governor John B. Weller when the two-county Sixteen Judicial District was first established.

Twenty-one charges were filed against Hardy by the Assembly. Taking place amid the American Civil War, one allegation was that he was disloyal to the Union, having frequently used "seditious and treasonable language concerning the Government of the United States." Another accusation was that he had multiple times been intoxicated while presiding over cases, including having once presided over case while, "so drunk as to be scarcely able to articulate". Another allegation was that he empaneled a jury "in to much a haste" during the trial of Davis S. Terry for killing David C. Broderick in a duel.

The impeachment trial lasted for fourteen days. Hardy was convicted on all but one of the twenty-one charges. The charge he was not convicted on concerned a toast he was alleged to have given to Confederate leader Jefferson Davis. After convicting Hardy, the Senate adopted a resolution to permanently suspend him from serving as a judge.

== Impeachment of Carlos S. Hardy (Los Angeles County Superior Court judge) in 1929 ==
In 1929, Los Angeles County Superior Court Judge Carlos S. Hardy was impeached "for misconduct and misdemeanor in office." Hardy was charged with four articles of impeachment, with the impeachment focusing on allegations of improper actions benefiting the Los Angeles evangelist Aimee Semple McPherson and her mother, Minnie Kennedy. Article 1 charged him with practicing law while serving as a judge by providing McPherson with legal advice. Article 2 charged him with obstructing justice in helping McPherson to avoid being tried on charges of conspiracy. McPherson had faced these charges from a matter in which she claimed to have been kidnapped when she had really traveled out of state willingly. Article 3 changed him with receiving a $2,500 check from McPherson for what charged to have been "legal services", but which Hardy asserted was a "love offering" with no connection to legal matters. Article 4 charged him with obstructing justice by trying to commit intimidate a witness in McPherson's case.

In the impeachment trial, Hardy denied all allegations brought against him and attacked the validity testimony of a witness against him on the grounds that she had once been confined to an insane asylum.

On April 26, 1929, the Senate acquitted Hardy, voting in closed session. On article 1 the Senate voted 37–2 to acquit. On article 2 it voted 21–18 to acquit. On article 3 it voted 23–16 to acquit. On article 4 it voted 26–13 to acquit.

Despite being acquitted in his impeachment trial, Hardy, lost his membership in the American Bar Association due to his acceptance of the $2,500 gift from McPherson.

== Other impeachment efforts ==
=== Peter Hardeman Burnett (governor) in 1850 ===
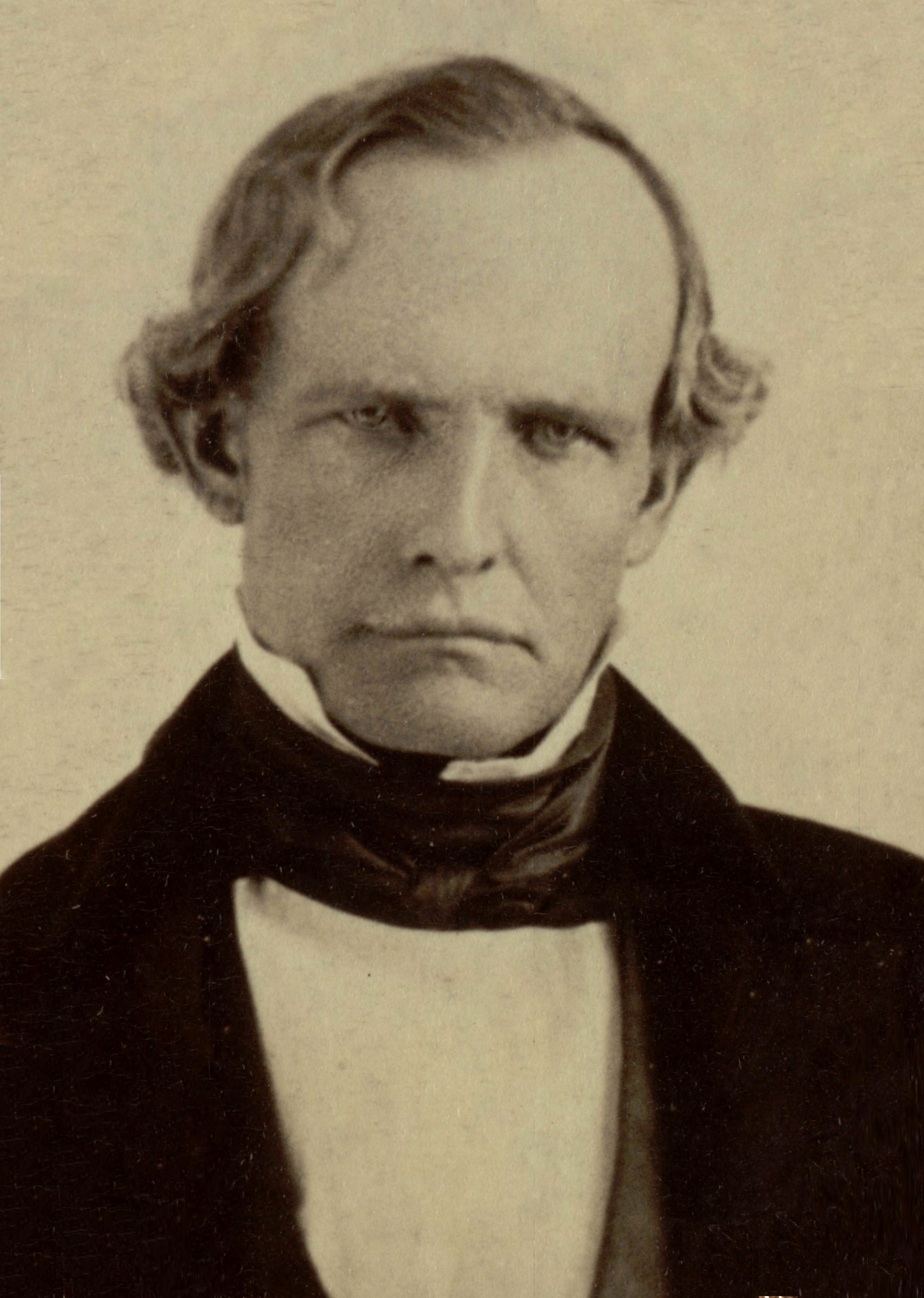
Governor Burnett

On February 15, 1850, Governor Peter Hardeman Burnett (a Democrat elected the state's inaugural governor on November 13, 1849) issued a proclamation to suspend the city of San Francisco from further sales of city lands until laws could be passed to settle controversy as to whether the San Francisco prefect and the prefect-appointed justices of the peace or the San Francisco City Council had the power to make such sales. The governor later ordered the state's attorney general to assist the San Francisco prefect to force the City Council to act in accordance with this law. In response to this, on March 26, 1850, the San Francisco City Council adopted charges against their prefect, Horace Hawes, which they sent to the governor to request Hawes's removal from office. On March 29, 1850, Governor Burnett suspended Hawes from his office.

In response to his suspension, on April 2, 1850, Hawes sent the Speaker of the State Assembly John Bigler a letter with charges against Governor Burnett. The letter urged that the speaker present these charges to the Assembly, "for such action as a sense of their own dignity, and that the State of California may dictate." Hawes made specific allegations that the government had violated the constitution by usurping powers that he did not hold. On April 4, 1850, Speaker Bigler presented the letter and its charges to the Assembly and moved that the matter be laid on the table. This motion was adopted, and the matter was never again addressed.

=== Levi Parsons (judge of the Fourth Judicial District) in 1851 ===
Judge Levi Parsons of the Fourth Judicial District, which covered San Francisco City and County had been appointed to his judgeship by a joint session of the state's first legislature on March 30, 1850, that appointed the state's first-ever district judges. Soon after, he was one of the targets of newspaper editorials published in the San Francisco Herald that criticized the courts. These editorials were primarily authored by William Walker. At the start of the March term of the court, Parsons instructed a grand jury to find "disturbance of the public tranquility" and "slander or libel [of] individual character" in these editorials. The following morning the Herald published an editorial condemning "judicial madness" and harshly criticizing the court. After this, Parsons cited Walker for contempt of court for this editorial Parsons judged the editorial was a gross libel on the court and held direct threats meant to intimidate the court's actions in carrying out its duty and to disrupt justice. Walker was found to be guilty and was fined $500, and was ordered to be imprisoned until he paid this fine. Walker refused to recognize the court's jurisdiction on such a matter, and refused to pay the fine, resulting in his imprisonment. This created tremendous controversy, with the press condemning this. Walker was seen as a heroic martyr for the freedom of the press. 4,000 people gathered at a meeting on March 9, 1851, to support Walker and demand the resignation of Parsons. They requested for senators and assemblymen of the district to initiate an impeachment. A writ of habeas corpus to the superior court succeeding in securing Walker's release, as the higher court held that Walker had not conducted himself in a manner that could be considered a technical contempt of the court that could result in summary punishment. On March 17, 1851, the memorial from Walker was presented before the assembly requesting that Parsons be impeached “for great tyranny and oppression.”

A select committee of the assembly was appointed to investigate, and reached the conclusion that Parsons had exceeded the limits of his power in imprisoning Walker and that Parsons was guilty of usurpation of power, gross tyranny, and oppression. In its March 26, 1851 report it recommended the impeachment of Parsons. The matter, however, was sent by the Assembly for review by another special committee. This committee gave both sides the opportunity to appear before the committee and have witnesses speak on their behalf. The second special committee concluded in its April 7, 1851 report that the state's constitution did not prevent Parsons from acting as he had, and that Parsons had not violated any law. It disagreed with the superior court finding and agreed with Parsons that Walker had indeed committed contempt of court by publishing. It reached the conclusion that contempt of court had occurred by finding that the editorial had impaired the necessary confidence between the grand jury and the judge and harmed the administration of law. It proposed the Assembly pass a resolution finding that the charges that Walker had brought against Parsons and the testimony in Walker's support had not demonstrated grounds for impeachment. The minority report presented by two dissenting members of the committee on April 8, 1851, however, recommended impeachment. After debate, on April 22, 1851, the Assembly voted 17–12 to find that testimony taken did not support the allegations that Walker had made against Parsons and did not demonstrate a need for an impeachment.

Subsequently, it was voted by the Assembly that testimony by Judge Parsons be removed from the journals and instead filed in the secretary of state's office. Parsons ultimately resigned from his judgeship in October 1851.

=== William R. Turner (judge of the Eighth Judicial District) in 1851 ===
William R. Turner, judge of the Eighth Judicial District in Marysville, had been appointed to his judgeship by a joint session of the state's first legislature on March 30, 1850, that appointed the state's first-ever district judges. In 1851, citizens of Yuba and Nevada Counties petitioned the legislature to impeach Turner On March 17, 1851, Assemblyman Stephen Johnson Field, an established adversary of Turner's, presented five such petitions to the legislature. The petitions made accusations of strong misconduct. A select committee was appointed to conduct an impeachment inquiry into the accusations. They took testimony beginning on March 20, with Field providing a long deposition. Field also submitted a number of official documents as evidence of the allegations. The defense provided testimony beginning on April 5. On April 15, the committee reported to the Assembly the testimony that it had collected. After three days of debate among the whole Assembly, a 15–12 vote was taken to indefinitely postpone the matter of impeachment.

Subsequently, it was voted by the Assembly that testimony by Judge Turner (and Judge Parsons) be removed from the journals and instead filed in the secretary of state's office. Impeachment was ultimately not pursued. One reason speculated for not pursuing impeachment is that there was a busy legislative calendar.

=== William R. Turner (judge of the Eighth Judicial District) in 1867 ===
On December 16, 1867, the State Assembly adopted a resolution introduced by Representative Charles Westmoreland of Humboldt County to authorize the creation a committee to run an impeachment inquiry that would investigate the potential of impeaching District Judge William R. Turner for high crimes and misdemeanors. Westmoreland accused Turner of,

Having been grossly tyrannical, with having wantonly deprived citizens of their liberty, with having willfully and corruptly neglected and refused to perform duties incumbent upon him, with having used his judicial power for the furtherance of his own private hate, with being an habitual drunkard...and with other disgraceful conduct, which made him a burden upon the people of the district too grievous to be borne.

Witnesses were called and evidence was gathered by the impeachment inquiry's committee. The committee was prepared to charge ahead with their investigation when Westmoreland, on January 16, 1868, moved to withdraw his charges after Turner had tendered his resignation.

=== Lucas Flattery Smith (Santa Cruz County Superior Court judge) in 1905 ===
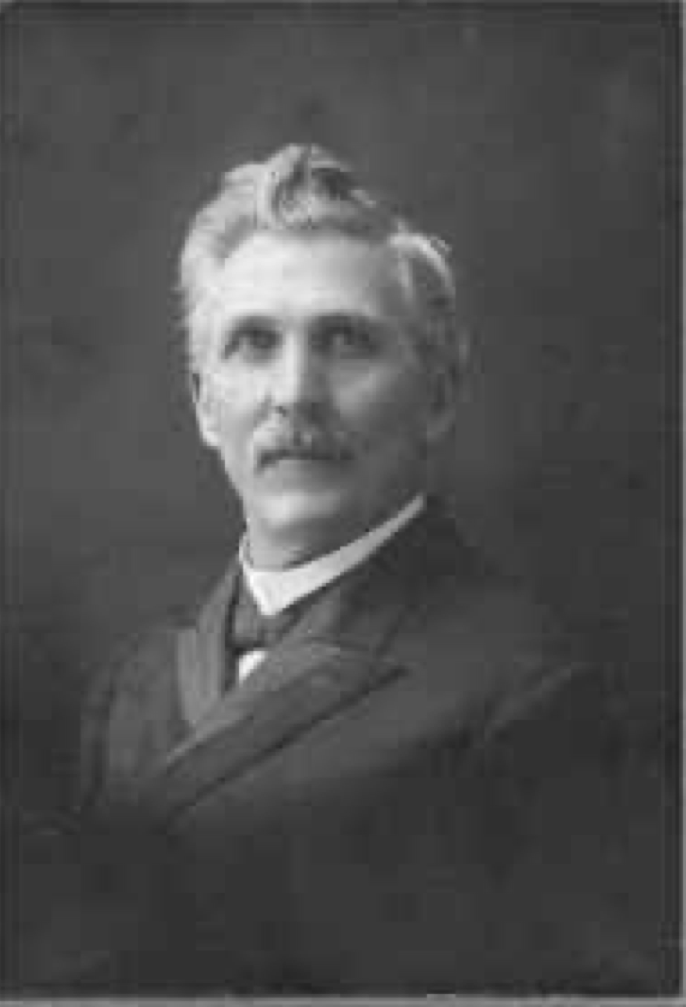
Judge Smith

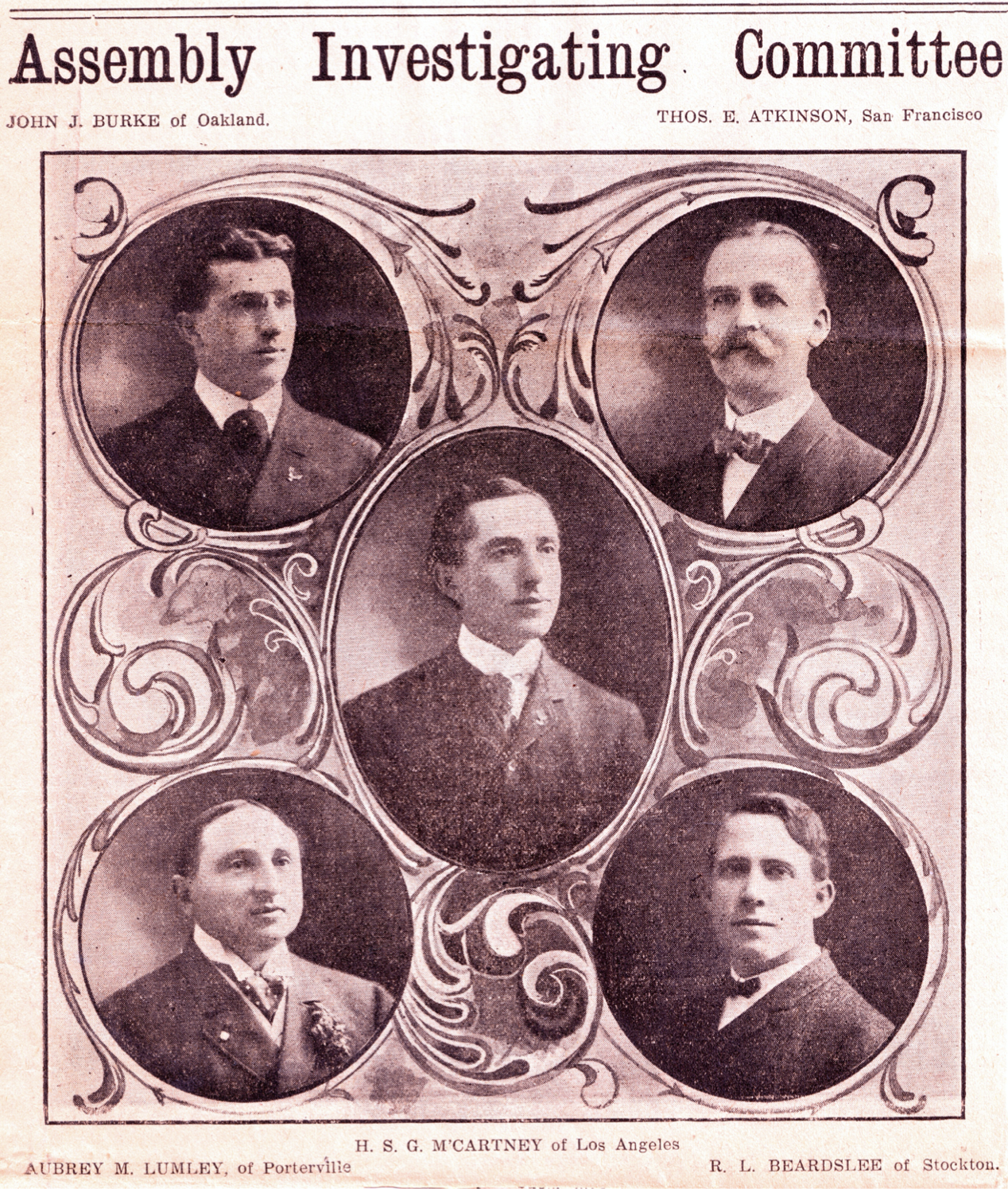
Members of the special committee for the impeachment inquiry against Judge Smith

In 1905, a special committee of the California Assembly ran an impeachment inquiry to investigate the possible impeachment of Santa Cruz County Superior Court Judge Lucas Flattery Smith. The committee was chaired by Assemblyman H. S. G. McCartney, with its other members being Assemblymen Thomas E. Atkinson, Robert Beardslee, John J. Burke, and Aubrey M. Lumley.

Smith had first been appointed to his judgeship on September 3, 1893, to fill the vacancy left by the August 8, 1893 death in office of Judge Ferdinand Jay McCann. On November 4, 1896, Smith was elected to a full twelve-year term.

Facing allegations of misconduct, on February 3, 1905, Smith himself petitioned that the Assembly appoint a special committee to investigate what he called, "the false and malicious charges preferred against me...made by this disreputable gang of cowardly and malicious scoundrels and notorious liars and slanderers." A total of twelve specific allegations of misconduct were presented to the Assembly on February 6 by Santa Cruz Attorney John H. Leonard. Among these were allegations of practicing "great partiality and favoritism" towards Charles M. Cassin, an attorney who practiced before his court and other misconduct on the bench; practicing "oppression and tyranny in his office" by "incorrectly and oppressively and without just cause" imprisoning two men "upon feigned, fictitious, and false" charges of contempt of court"; and various other actions and ruling as judge that were called into question. That day, Assemblyman George C. Cleveland introduced a resolution that created a special committee to run an impeachment inquiry into Smith. On February 7, Speaker Frank C. Prescott appointed the members of the special committee.

The impeachment inquiry collected testimony, including testimony on behalf of the Smith's defense. Among those who testified before the special committee was Frederick A. Hihn. On March 7, 1905, the special committee recommended against impeachment for "want of sufficient evidence" to sustain the allegations brought against Smith. However Santa Cruz Surf editor Arthur A. Taylor wrote on September 4, 1905, that the hearings into Smith had resulted in, "a report embodying the most severe reprimand ever administered to a judge in the State."

Remaining in office, Smith would be re-elected on November 3, 1908, in a three-way race against Nathan L. Griest Carl E. Lindsay, with Smith winning 3,028 votes to Lindsay's 1,692 and Griest's 374 votes. In 1914, he lost his run for a further term, being unseated by Benjamin K. Knight Jr.

== See also ==
- Impeachment by state and territorial governments of the United States
- Impeachment in the United States
- Government of California
- Recall election
