= Impeachment in Alaska =

The constitution of the U.S. state of Alaska grants its legislature the ability to impeach and remove "all civil officers of the State". An impeachment vote in the Alaska Senate is followed by an impeachment trial in the Alaska House of Representatives through which an official will be removed from office if convicted.

== Impeachment law ==
The Constitution of Alaska states that, "all civil officers of the State are subject to impeachment by the legislature."

In Alaska, impeachment and removal is a two-step process. First, the Senate votes to impeach, with a two-thirds vote being required for such an action. The constitution does not provide specification as to what should be considered grounds for impeachment, however any motion to impeach is required to "list fully the basis" for the impeachment. After an official has been impeached, a impeachment trial is conducted by the House of Representatives. A vote in which two-thirds of the House's membership agrees to convict is required in order for an official to be convicted and remove from office. The only punishment that can be provided through an impeachment trial conviction is removal from office.

Having the upper chamber (the Senate) impeach and the lower chamber (the House of Representatives) conduct the impeachment trial is unique to Alaska in the United States, being a reverse of federal impeachment and impeachment in most states and territories in which the lower chamber impeaches and the upper chamber holds the trial.

== Impeachment efforts ==
=== Governor Bill Sheffield (1985) ===
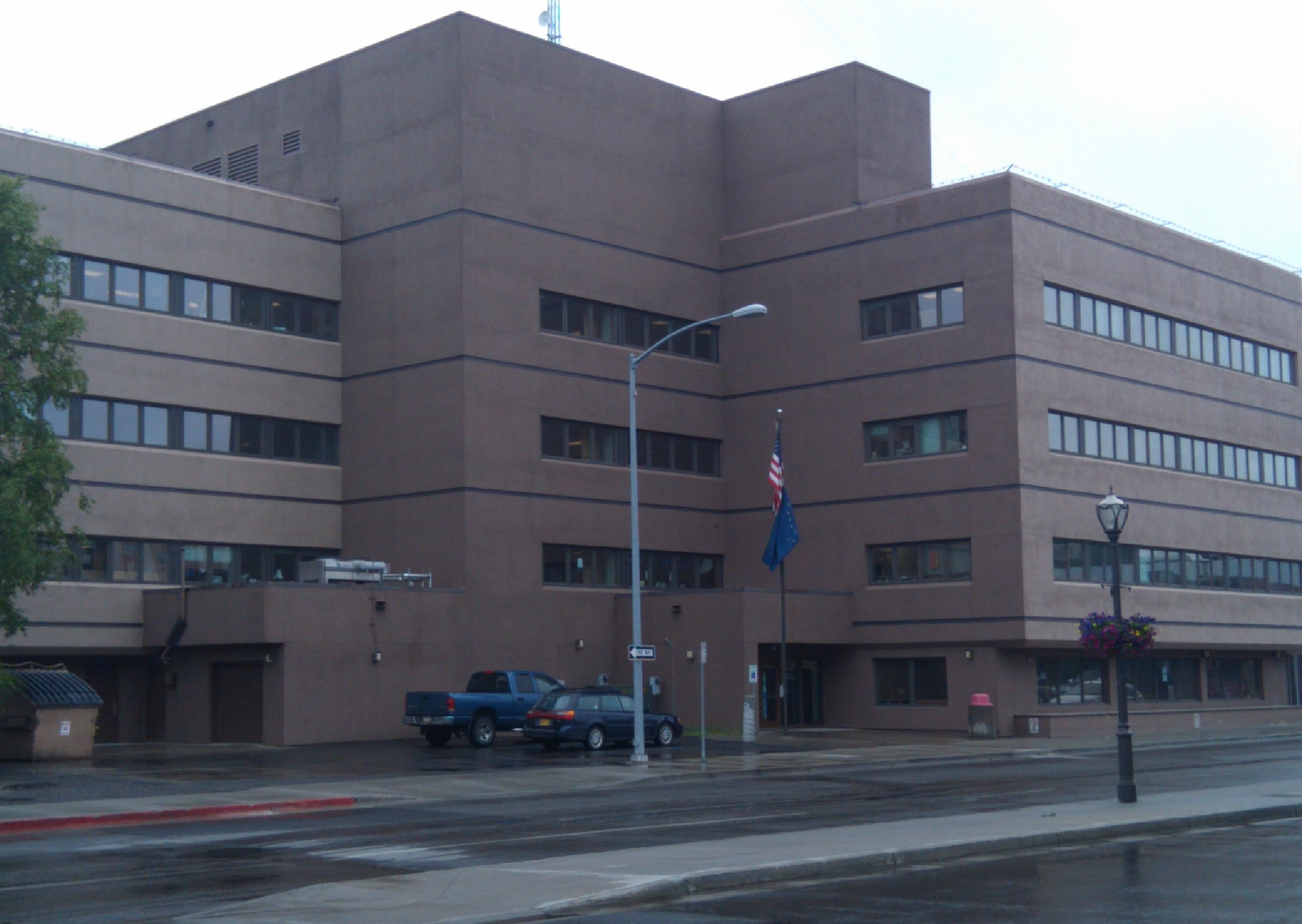
The building at the heart of the Sheffield impeachment effort, which for most of its history has served as the headquarters of the Fairbanks North Star Borough School District.

In 1985, Governor Bill Sheffield appeared before a grand jury that was investigating alleged favoritism and lack of proper due process in awarding a $9.1 million contract for the lease of office space in Fairbanks for use by state agencies. The grand jury's report did not indict Sheffield. However, the grand jury's report did opine that Sheffield was not fit to hold office, and urged the Senate to consider impeaching him for potential perjury before the grand jury. The grand jury report wound up being published in the news after members of the press were anonymously informed that they could find a copy of it in a garbage receptacle at the court building at which the grand jury deliberations had been held. After the report was published by the press, deliberations about an impeachment were initiated. Sheffield was a Democrat. Since the Republicans held a 11–9 majority over Democrats in the Senate, Republicans alone could impeach Sheffield by a hypothetical pure party-line vote.

An impeachment inquiry was launched in the Senate Rules Committee, with had four Republican members and one Democratic member. The grand jury report's recommendation was referred to that committee. Samuel Dash served as a legal counsel to the Senate Rules committee during the inquiry. Philip Lacovara, who had been Sheffield's counsel before the Grand Jury, served that role during the impeachment inquiry as well. It was decided by the committee chair, Republican Tim Kelly, to permit the televising of their proceedings. Some proceedings were held at night to increase viewership by Alaskans, and the proceedings were well-watched. Additionally, the remaining members of the Senate attended the hearings as spectators. When the governor himself appeared before the committee, all Senate members were permitted to question him. In total, eleven days of hearings were held.

Advising the committee that it would be hard to prove that Sheffield had committed abuse of process, Dash instead advised they focus their investigation on a potential case of perjury by Sheffield. Significant testimony was collected in the inquiry, and much deliberation was conducted.

Ultimately, by a 3–2 vote in early August, the Senate Rules Committee voted to send the Senate a report concluding that there was insufficient evidence against Sheffield to warrant an impeachment. The Senate then voted 12–8 against impeaching Sheffield. The Senate also narrowly voted against a resolution directly condemning Sheffield. Instead, the Senate opted to ultimately pass a resolution condemning his gubernatorial administration for favoritism.

== See also ==
- Impeachment by state and territorial governments of the United States
- Impeachment in the United States
