= Senator Krueger (disambiguation) =

Bob Krueger (1935–2022) was a U.S. Senator from Texas in 1993. Senator Krueger or Kruger may also refer to:

- Clifford Krueger (1918–1988), Wisconsin
- Liz Krueger (born 1957), New York State Senate
- Carl Kruger (born 1949), New York State Senate

== See also ==
- Althea Kroger (1946–2012), Vermont State Senate
- Herman Kroeger (1831–1916), Wisconsin State Senate
