= Robert C. Dorn =

American politician

Erie Canal Commissioner
- In office 1866–1868

Personal details
- Party: Republican
- Profession: Politician

Robert C. Dorn was an American politician from New York. In 1865, he was elected Canal Commissioner on the Republican ticket. In May 1868, he was put on trial by the Senate of New York in the Court of Impeachment, becoming the second person tried by the New York Court for the Trial of Impeachments.

== Life ==
Robert C. Dorn lived in Schenectady, New York.

=== Repair Commissioner ===
He was appointed Superintendent of Canal Repairs for Section 2 of the Erie Canal, when he was named the Superintendent of Repairs for only section # 2 in January 1856, with William Eggleston becoming superintendent for #1. He was then appointed Superintendent of Canal Repairs for Sections 1, 3, 4 and 5 until the end of 1864, and continued with Sections 1, 2 and 3 in 1865.

As of 1865, all repair sections of the canal were in charge of Robert C. Dorn as superintendent, and he was replaced in that role on January 24, 1855, when George Heath was appointed superintendent for sections four and five, with Dorn remaining in charge of one, two, and three.

=== Canal Commissioner ===
He was selected to run for Canal Commissioner on the Republican ticket on September 20, 1865, after being nominated at the New-York Republican Union State Convention. In November 1865, Dorn won the race in the New York state elections of 1865. He took the role of Canal Commissioner on January 1, 1866, with the term to last three years. He was a Canal Commissioner from 1866 to 1868.

It was published in 1870 that $16,340 had been transferred from the Fund of the Erie Canal Enlargement for enlargement and completion of the canals to the Canal Commissioners, with Robert C. Dorn of the Eastern Division receiving $376 of that total. Tolls on the Erie canal were reported to be $3,666,093, with Dorn as of September 30, 1868, holding $5,450 of the balances on hand for the Canal Commissioner. He oversaw a number of financially significant improvement investments on the canal, including $27,166 for "extraordinary repairs".

=== Initial impeachment ===
Many New Yorker's felt corruption was a major cause of the canal system's troubles. In 1867 at the state Constitutional Convention, Erastus Brooks alleged canal contracts of being awarded to the highest bidder. A commission was established, consisting of James Gibson, Henry C. Murphy, Charles Stanford, William Bristol, William S. Clark, George W. Millspaugh, and counsel Henry Smith. It concluded there were "gross and monstrous frauds".

Concerning Dorn's history of awarding contracts, a court assembled in the Albany Senate Chamber on March 31, 1868, under Stewart L. Woodford, Lieutenant-Governor of the State and President of the Senate. The managers appointed to conduct the trial were John C. Jacobs, John L. Flagg, John F. Little, William B. Quinn, E. L. Pitts, Alpheus Prince, and N. B. La Ban. The honorable William A. Beach, John H. Reynolds, and Henry Smith were counsel for the Dorn. Assembled to ascertain whether Dorn had, in 1886 and 1867, awarded construction contracts in a corrupt fashion while ignoring a prior law to select the cheapest bid, a resolution impeaching him of high crimes and misdemeanors passed the assembly with a unanimous vote.

The court re-assembled in the Senate Chamber on April 2, 1868.

He was impeached by a unanimous vote of the New York State Assembly. The First Article charged him with "complicity in a combination made by contractors". Article Two charged him with "letting a contract to the highest instead of the lowest bidder". Article Four charged him with "letting contracts without advertising some".

=== Court of Impeachment, May 1868 ===
In May 1868, the Court of Appeals and the New York Senate met jointly as a Court of Impeachment to settle the matter of Dorn's case. The trial before the Court of Impeachments opened on May 26 at Albany. During the first meeting, there was a motion from the defense to quash the Fourth Article accusations of Dorn awarding contracts without advertising them first. On May 27, 1868, the Court of Appeals and the Senate again met jointly as a Court of Impeachment, with counsel for the defendant arguing that senator Sandford, as Chairman of the Canal Investigating Committee, had prejudged the case on several points. On June 12, 1886, Dorn was acquitted with a vote of 8 for conviction, among them Martin Grover, Theodore Miller, and 19 against, among them Ward Hunt, Lewis B. Woodruff, Charles Mason and William J. Bacon. He was acquitted of all charges.

== See also ==
- Erie Canal Commission
- Canal Ring (New York)
