= George M. Curtis (New York politician) =

American politician

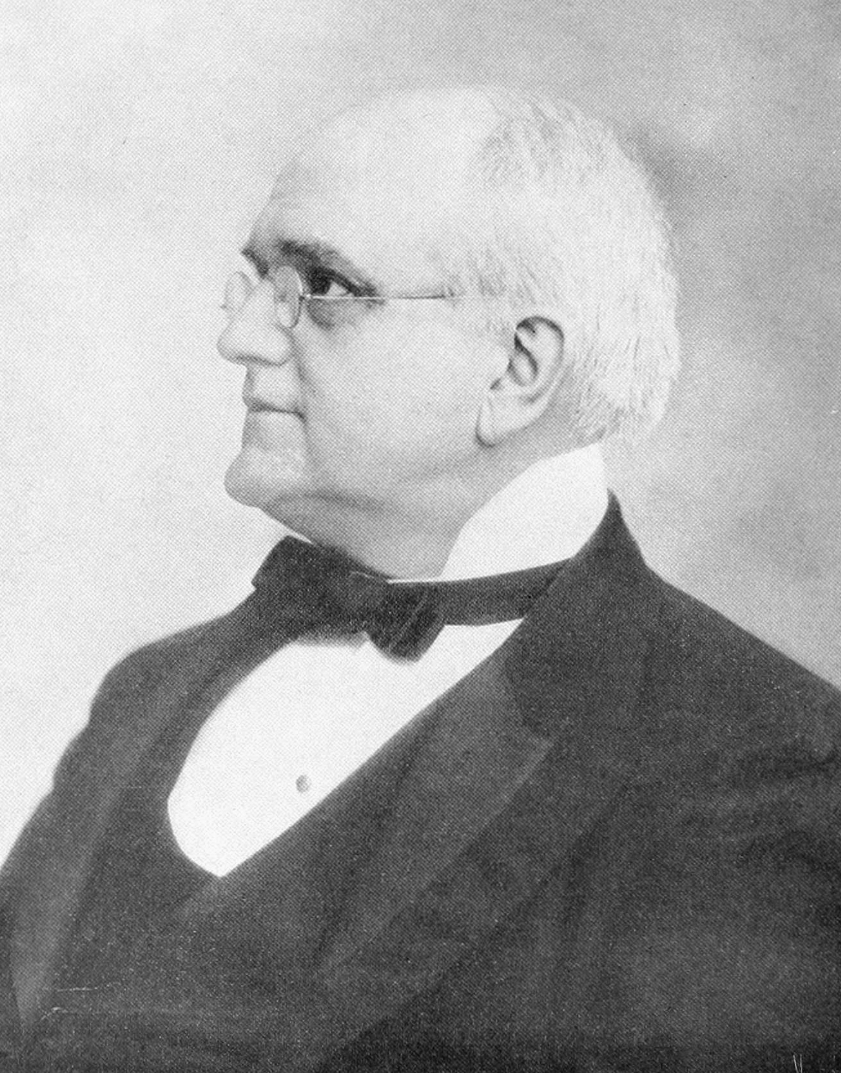

Member of the New York State Assembly
- In office 1864, 1866
- Constituency: New York County 3rd District (Wards 3, 5, and 8)

Personal details
- Born: George Milton Curtis; June 20, 1840 Worcester, Massachusetts
- Died: May 14, 1915 (aged 74) Brooklyn, New York
- Party: Democratic
- Spouse: Caroline Gertrude Miller
- Occupation: Lawyer, politician, judge
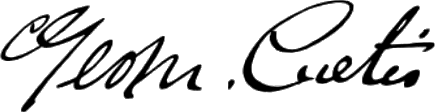
- Signature

George Milton Curtis (June 20, 1840 – May 14, 1915) was an American lawyer, politician, and judge from New York.

== Life ==
Curtis was born on June 20, 1840, in Worcester, Massachusetts, the son of Beriah Curtis and Lydia Massena Denye Hunter. He attended the local schools, Worcester High School, and the Baptist Academy in Worcester.

Curtis was preparing for college when the American Civil War broke out. He left his studies to enlist in the Union Army, serving in the 3rd Massachusetts Rifles Battalion under Major (later General) Charles Devens. He served beyond his enlistment period in order to participate in a great battle expected to occur at the time. He then returned to private life and studied law under John W. Ashmead. He was admitted to the New York bar in 1864, and in 1865 he was appointed assistant Corporation Counsel of New York City. He served as judge of the Marine Court (later known as the City Court) from 1868 to 1874. While on the court, Curtis was impeached. He was charged with having become partner of a "law firm whose principal practice" was trying cases before the Marine court, and of starting profits with his partner in that firm. The charges also cited cases where he had "dismissed jury and assumed decision of case solely himself". He was acquitted, as his impeachment trial did not result in a two-thirds concurrence for guilt.

In 1863, Curtis was elected to the New York State Assembly as a Democrat, representing the New York County 3rd District (Wards 3, 5, and 8). He served in the Assembly in 1864 and 1866. While in the Assembly, he made speeches in defense of Governor Horatio Seymour (which was copied and reported on by papers all over the country) and in favor of a Health Bill.

Curtis spent forty years as a widely known and successful lawyer, specializing in litigation trials with wills that were under attack or involved questions of insanity and conducting trials all over the country. He conducted a number of will contests, including for the wills of tobacconist John Anderson, Senator James G. Fair, theatrical manager Frank Stetson, A. T. Stewart, publisher Frank Leslie, and Maltby G. Lane. He was involved in the Louisiana Lottery contest and pleaded the case of Jerome C. Collin during the Jeanette inquiry before Congress. He successfully defended a number of people indicted for murder, famously defending Thomas Buford, brother of Union Cavalry leader General John Buford, for the murder of Chief Justice John Milton Elliott of Kentucky in 1879. No Kentucky lawyer would defend Buford in the trial. Curtis successfully obtained an appeal with an insanity plea, believed to be the first time in a criminal trial "emotional insanity" was used as a defense. It was also the first time a complete stenographic report was published in a newspaper, the Louisville Courier-Journal. He also William C. Rhinelander, who was accused of shooting lawyer William Drake.

Curtis was a member of the New York County Lawyers' Association, the.New York State Bar Association, the American Bar Association, the Freemasons, the Grand Army of the Republic, and the New York Historical Society. For over forty years, he was counsel of "On Leong Tong," a benevolent society that focused on interests of Chinese Americans. He was married to Caroline Gertrude Miller. Their son George Milton Jr. was also a lawyer.

Curtis died at his son George's home in Flatbush from heart trouble on May 14, 1915. He was cremated in Fresh Pond Crematory, and the ashes were buried in Worcester, Massachusetts.

New York State Assembly
Preceded by George L. Loutrel	New York State Assembly; New York County, 3rd District; 1864	Succeeded by George L. Loutrel
Preceded by George L. Loutrel	New York State Assembly; New York County, 3rd District; 1866	Succeeded by Daniel O'Reilly
