= Impeachment in Wyoming =

The Constitution of Wyoming has a provision for the impeachment of state officials. As of 2025, it no official has been impeached under it.

== Impeachment law ==
=== Background and history ===
The earliest history of government in Wyoming occurred at a time when impeachment was a prominent subject, with the Territory of Wyoming being established around the time of the impeachment and impeachment trial of President Andrew Johnson (under the nation's federal impeachment process).

=== Constitutional provisions ===
==== Article III ====
The Constitution of Wyoming's primary provisions on impeachment and removal are contained in Article III. Sections 17 and 18 of this article (which each with removal by impeachment) have been unchanged since the constitution's ratification in 1889. The language of section 19 (dealing with removal of officials not subject to impeachment) was ratified in 1986.

Article II section 17 pertains impeachment power and impeachment proceedings,

The sole power of impeachment shall vest in the house of representatives; the concurrence of a majority of all the members being necessary to the exercise thereof. Impeachment shall be tried by the senate sitting for that purpose, and the senators shall be upon oath or affirmation to do justice according to law and evidence. When the governor is on trial, the chief justice of the supreme court shall preside. No person shall be convicted without a concurrence of two-thirds of the senators elected.

Article II section 18 outlines which officials may be subject impeached,

The governor and other state and judicial officers except justices of the peace, shall be liable to impeachment for high crimes and misdemeanors, or malfeasance in office, but judgment in such cases shall only extend to removal from office and disqualification to hold any office of honor, trust or profit under the laws of the state. The party, whether convicted or acquitted, shall, nevertheless, be liable to prosecution, trial, judgment and punishment according to law.

Article II section 19 outlines the removal of officials not subject to impeachment,

Except as hereafter provided, all officers not liable to impeachment shall be subject to removal for misconduct or malfeasance in office as provided by law. Any person appointed by the governor to serve as head of a state agency, or division thereof, or to serve as a member of a state board or commission, may be removed by the governor as provided by law.

==== Article VI, Section 16 ====
Article VI, Section 16 permits the legislature to pass laws that would enable the suspension of an impeached officer's function if they are pending a verdict either in an impeachment or criminal prosecution. The section's language is original to the 1889 ratification of the state constitution.

==== Other provisions ====
Several other state constitutional provisions mention impeachment.

Article V section 1 (outlining how judicial power is vested) lists the Senate as holding state judicial when sitting as a "court of impeachment" during an impeachment trial. The current language (adopted in 1967) reads,

The judicial power of the state shall be vested in the senate, sitting as a court of impeachment, in a supreme court, district courts, and such subordinate courts as the legislature may, by general law, establish and ordain from time to time.

Article IV section 5 (outlining the pardon power of governors) indicates that the only verdicts of conviction for which the governor holds no power to offer pardons are impeachment verdicts and treason convictions.

=== Additional laws and rules ===
==== Statutes on suspension of impeached officials pending trial ====
State statute 9-1-214 makes automatic that when a governor is impeached, they are suspended from their officials functions pending the outcome of their impeachment trial,

When the house of representatives impeaches the governor, he is automatically suspended from performing the function of his office pending the trial and other proceedings in the impeachment. During the suspension the duties of the governor shall be performed as provided in W.S. 9-1-212.

State statute 9-1-203 allows the governor to suspend from official functions any other state or judicial officer that has been impeached by the House pending the outcome of the official's impeachment trial. It also allows the governor to designate and appoint a qualified individual to fill the office and discharge its duties in the interim,

When the house of representatives impeaches a state or judicial officer other than the governor, the governor may suspend the officer from his official functions pending the trial and other proceedings in the impeachment and may designate and appoint a qualified person to fill the office and discharge the duties thereof during the suspension.

== See also ==
- Impeachment by state and territorial governments of the United States
- Impeachment in the United States
