= Philip Lacovara =

American lawyer and legal scholar

Philip A. Lacovara (born July 11, 1943) is an American lawyer and legal scholar. He is best known as counsel to special prosecutor Archibald Cox during the Watergate Scandal.

== Early life and education ==
Philip Allen Lacovara was born on July 11, 1943, in New York City. His father was a trusts and estates lawyer.

Lacovara earned a BA in Political Science and Philosophy from Georgetown University in 1963. He earned a JD from Columbia University School of Law in 1966, graduating first in his class at the age of 23. At Columbia, Lacovara worked as research assistant to Herbert Wechsler, then-director of the American Law Institute.

== Career ==
Moving to Washington D.C. after law school, Lacovara served as a clerk with Washington D.C. Circuit Court Judge Harold Leventhal. He then worked as special assistant to then-Solicitor General Thurgood Marshall and his successor, Erwin Griswold. In 1968, at 25, Lacovara argued several cases before the Supreme Court under Solicitor General Griswold.

in 1969, Lacovara entered private practice, joining New York City law firm Hughes, Hubbard, & Reed as an associate. He took a leave of absence in 1971 to work as Special Counsel to New York City Police Commissioner Patrick Vincent Murphy under Mayor John Lindsay.

In 1972, Lacovara returned to D.C. as Deputy Solicitor General of the United States under Solicitor General Griswold. He worked briefly under Solicitor General Robert Bork after Griswold's resignation in 1973.

== Watergate Special Prosecutor's Office ==
In spring 1973, special prosecutor Archibald Cox appointed Lacovara as counsel to the special prosecutor in the Watergate special prosecutor's office.

That summer, Col. Alexander Butterfield testified that President Richard Nixon had secretly recorded his own conversations in the Oval Office and elsewhere. The Senate Watergate Committee and Prosecutor Cox issued subpoenas for the tapes, but President Nixon claimed the recordings were protected by executive privilege and refused to comply. Federal Judge John Sirica ordered President Nixon to turn over the tapes, which was upheld on appeal by the Circuit Court, but President Nixon continued to refuse, offering instead to provide written summaries of the subpoenaed tapes and allow Mississippi senator John Stennis to hear the tapes and confirm the summaries' accuracy. Prosecutor Cox refused what became known as the Stennis compromise.

On Saturday October 20, 1973, in an event that became known as the Saturday Night Massacre, President Nixon ordered Attorney General Elliot Richardson to fire Cox, but Richardson instead resigned. Richardson's second-in-command, Deputy Attorney General William Ruckelshaus, received the same order, but he too tendered his resignation. Solicitor General Bork became acting attorney general, and complied with President Nixon's order to fire Cox. That same evening Lacovara, who briefly worked with Bork in the solicitor general's office, called Bork, who alerted Lacovara of Cox' dismissal, but said he had no orders to dismantle the special prosecutor's office or fire other prosecutors. Lacovara relayed this information to deputy prosecutor Henry Ruth and the rest of the staff, who agreed to retrieve their files and continue their work. FBI agents blocked their entry into the office, however, and told them the president had officially disbanded the office of the special prosecutor.

As news broke that Sunday, the White House received an unprecedented deluge of telegrams protesting the President's actions. By Tuesday, Judge Sirica had forbidden the FBI from seizing materials from the special prosecutor's office, ordered the grand juries hearing the Watergate indictments to continue their work, and was in the process of preparing a contempt citation against the President. On Wednesday October 24, President Nixon reversed course, and agreed to provide the tapes to the court, as ordered. Leon Jaworski was named the new special prosecutor on November 2.

Jaworski subpoenaed sixty-four taped conversations, but Nixon again appealed, claiming the materials were protected by executive privilege, and that the office of Special Prosecutor lacked the right to sue the office of president. Jaworski appealed directly to the Supreme Court.

On July 8, 1974, Lacovara delivered 35 minutes of oral argument before the Supreme Court in United States v. Nixon.

== 1973-present ==
In 1981 President Reagan appointed Lacovara as the Presidential appointee to the District of Columbia Judicial Nomination Commission.

== Personal life ==
In 1962, while still an undergraduate student at Georgetown, Lacovara married his wife, Madeline. They had seven children.
