= Theodore Miller =

American judge

Theodore Miller (May 16, 1816 – August 18, 1895) was an American lawyer and politician from New York.

== Life ==
Born in Hudson, Columbia County, New York, he was admitted to the bar in 1837. He was District Attorney of Columbia County from 1843 to 1847.

He was a justice of the New York Supreme Court (3rd District) from 1861 to 1874, and ex officio a judge of the Court of Appeals in 1868.

In 1874, he was elected on the Democratic ticket a judge of the New York Court of Appeals, and remained on the bench until the end of 1886 when he reached the constitutional age limit of 70 years.

== Personal life and death ==
Miller died in Hudson at the age of 79.

== Sources ==
- Court of Appeals judges
- OBITUARY RECORD.; Theodore Miller in NYT on August 19, 1895
- The New York Civil List compiled by Franklin Benjamin Hough (page 372; Weed, Parsons and Co., 1858)
