= Impeachment manager =

Legislator appointed as prosecutor for impeachment trials

An impeachment manager is a legislator appointed to serve as a prosecutor in an impeachment trial. They are also often called "House managers" or "House impeachment manager" when appointed from a legislative chamber that is called a "House of Representatives".

== United States ==
=== Federal ===
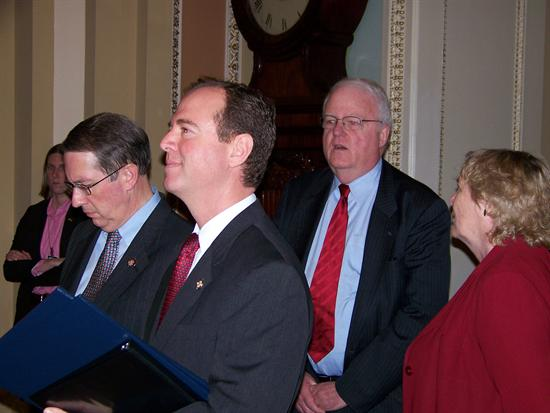
House impeachment managers for the 2009 trial of Judge Samuel B. Kent stand together before transferring the articles of impeachment to the Senate. (Left to right: Bob Goodlatte, Adam Schiff, Jim Sensenbrenner, Zoe Lofgren)

In federal impeachment trials in the United States, which are held before the United States Senate after an impeachment by the United States House of Representatives, the United States House of Representatives appoints impeachment managers, a committee of members of the House who, together, act as the prosecutors in the impeachment trial.

While they are always approved by House vote, how the initial decision of who serves as a managers is arrived at has differed between impeachments. In some impeachments, the House managers have been chosen upon the recommendation of the chairman of the House Committee on the Judiciary. Another way that has been used is by having the whole house decide by balloting who should serve. In some other impeachments, the speaker of the House has chosen the slate of impeachment managers that were thereafter approved by House vote.

=== State ===
Some states, such as Pennsylvania, follow the federal model of having members of the lower chamber of the legislature serve as impeachment managers in impeachment trials held in the upper chamber.

In some states, such as California and Indiana, all articles of impeachment must be authored by impeachment managers who will then prosecute those articles.

Impeachment managers were used in impeachments in some of the American colonies during the colonial era of the United States.

== United Kingdom ==
Impeachment managers were a component of impeachment in the United Kingdom, where impeachment is now an effectively-obsolete practice.
