= Althea Kroger =

American politician (1919–2011)

Member of the Vermont Senate
- In office 1990–1994

Member of the Vermont House of Representatives
- In office 1978–1986

Personal details
- Born: Althea Przybylo; October 9, 1946 Chicago, Illinois, U.S.
- Died: August 30, 2012 (aged 65) Colchester, Vermont, U.S.
- Party: Democratic
- Education: Saint Louis University (BA); Harvard Kennedy School (MPA); University of Vermont (MA); Vermont Law and Graduate School (JD); International House World Organisation (teaching certificate)

Althea Przybylo Kroger (October 9, 1946 – August 30, 2012) was an American politician and judge. She served as a member of the Vermont House of Representatives and Vermont Senate and as an assistant judge of Chittenden County.

== Early life and education ==
Kroger was born in Chicago, Illinois on October 9, 1946. She attended St. Helen's Polish Catholic elementary school, graduating in 1960. She attended the Mount St. Mary high school in St. Charles, Illinois, graduating in 1964.

Kroger attended St. Louis University, graduating in 1969 from with a bachelor's degree in psychology. At the university, she met Joe Kroger, whom she married in 1969. The Krogers moved to Toronto, Canada where Joe received his doctorate in theology. Around this time, Althea gave birth to their son Andrew.

After Joe Kroger became a professor in theology at Saint Michael's College, the Krogers moved to the state of Vermont.

From 1975 through 1977, Kroger served as acting chairman of the Essex Junction Planning Commission. The village trustees of the Essex Junction later appointed her to the Chittenden County Regional Planning Commission. Kroger participated in social justice activism, particularly on women's rights. Kroger would hold a number of appointed offices over the years, including serving for six years on the board of trustees of the University of Vermont.

Kroger continued her education, receiving a certificate in Polish Language and Culture from Jagiellonian University in 1983, a master's degree in political science from the University of Vermont in 1985, a Juris Doctor from the Vermont Law School in 1988, and a masters in public administration from Harvard University's John F. Kennedy School of Government. During her time at Harvard, Kroger co-taught a course with Shirley Williams on women in politics.

== Vermont House ==
In 1978, Kroger won election to the Vermont House of Representatives. She had run a grassroots campaign in a competitive race. She served two four terms. She was a member of the Judiciary Committee and later was on the Appropriations Committee. For two terms, she was Democratic assistant leader, a whip role.

Among her prime focuses as a legislator was increasing state aid to low income individuals and the elderly. On this, she supported increasing funding for Vermont Aid to Needy Families with Children, proposed legislation to allow the state to grant tax breaks on property tax to senior citizens, and was supportive of the Independence Fund (which provided funding for alternatives to nursing home care). She also supported increased funding of higher education and services related to mental health and special education.

Kroger proposed legislation aimed at making the state's Lobbyist Disclosure Law stronger. She championed the creation of legislation allowing anyone over the age of 18 to establish an advance healthcare directive (living will). She co-sponsored legislation to ban corporal punishment at schools.

Kroger left the state house in order to attend law school.

== Vermont Senate ==
In 1990, Kroger was elected to the Vermont Senate. She served two terms. During one of these terms, she was minority party assistant leader (whip). Coinciding with her time in the state senate, she served as moderator of Essex Junction from 1990 through 1994.

Kroger was the sponsor of successful legislation which increased funding affordable housing, created a prohibition on sex discrimination in public spaces, allowed workers to take uncompensated family leave, and required that insurance cover mammograms.

Kroger was chair of a conference committee for successful legislation to allow Burlington to redevelop lands on its Lake Champlain waterfront for cultural activities, arts education, water research facilities, and dining facilities.

== Judicial career ==
In 1995, Kroger was elected an assistant judge of Chittenden County. In this position, she served as a judge on the family court judge and as Chittenden County Administrator. The state house considered impeaching her in 1996, launching an impeachment inquiry. In July 1997, in re:Kroger No. 96-495, the Vermont Supreme Court found that Kroger had perjured by giving false statements under oath in testimony before VACJ hearings and suspended Kroger from her judgeship for a year. In December 1997, Kroger resigned. The court reprimanded Kroger on August 31, 1998.

== Later life and death ==
After resigning her judgeship, Kroger took a trip to Poland, after which she decided to move permanently to that country. In 1999, she received a certification to teach English as a second language from the International House World Organisation in Kraków. after which she founded and taught for ten years at the Althea Institute in Dębica.

In 1996, Kroger had been diagnosed with advanced colon cancer, but was able to successfully fight her ailment. In July 2012, she was diagnosed with aggressive lung cancer and bone cancer, which she died from on August 30, 2012.
