= Article of impeachment =

Legal concept

An article of impeachment is a documented statement which specifies the charges to be tried in an impeachment trial as a basis for removing an officeholder. Articles of impeachment are an aspect of impeachment processes of many governments that utilize a bifurcated (two-part) impeachment process that sees a vote to "impeach" followed by an impeachment trial on whether to remove an officer.

In an impeachment trial, an article of impeachment serves the same role that an indictment would in a criminal trial. Articles of impeachment are adopted prior to an impeachment trial by the legislative body with authority to invoke the impeachment that triggers the trial. In the trial, the accused party generally attempts to counter the elements of the article(s) of impeachment through arguments.

== United States ==
=== Federal government ===
In the United States federal government impeachments, the articles of impeachment are adopted by the United States House of Representatives. After the articles are sent to the United States Senate, the Senate holds an impeachment trial on the charges of the article, sitting as the "High Court of Impeachment".

==== Adoption ====
An article of impeachment may be preceded by a separate article first declaring an impeachment. In such an instance, an official is already impeached and pending a trial even before the adoption of any articles to provide specific charges to be tried on. This was standard practice in the 19th century. Alternatively, in more modern impeachment, article(s) of impeachment are instead directly adopted without any such preceding impeachment resolution, in which case the first article of impeachment to be adopted is what officially impeaches the official.

In the past, proposed articles have both been first approved by a committee or have gone to a direct floor vote without committee approval. In order for any article of impeachment to advance from a committee to a full vote of the House, a simple majority vote of the committee is typically needed so that the committee can forward the article. A committee may forward multiple articles, with each one usually requiring a separate vote of the committee. Often articles are created by a committee that has been tasked with running an impeachment inquiry. In this instance, they are typically considered in a meeting called a "markup".

After the House has approved articles of impeachment by a simple majority, the United States Senate will be presented with the matter, leading to an impeachment trial.

=== State ===
Articles of impeachment have also been used in impeachment at the state level.

=== Other government bodies ===
Many tribal governments have impeachment processes, some of which make use of articles of impeachment.

== Philippines ==
Articles of impeachment are utilized in the impeachment process of the Philippines.

== United Kingdom ==
When impeachment was a practice in the United Kingdom, articles of impeachment were, by convention, utilized in the impeachment process.

== See also ==
- Articles of impeachment adopted against Andrew Johnson
