= Impeachment trial =

Trial of a public official triggered by impeachment

An impeachment trial is a trial that functions as a component of an impeachment. Several governments utilize impeachment trials as a part of their processes for impeachment. Differences exist between governments as to what stage trials take place in their processes for impeachment, and how such trials are held.

== Trial as an earlier stage of an impeachment process ==
In some countries, the term "impeachment" refers to the ultimate removal of an officeholder. In some such countries, a trial process is a component of the process related to impeachment, and occurs prior to an "impeachment" vote. An example of a government where this is the case is Brazil.

== Trial as the final stage of a two-stage impeachment process ==
Several other governments use a two-stage process in which a vote to "impeach" triggers a subsequent trial in which the "impeached" individual is tried to determine whether they should be removed from office.

=== United States ===
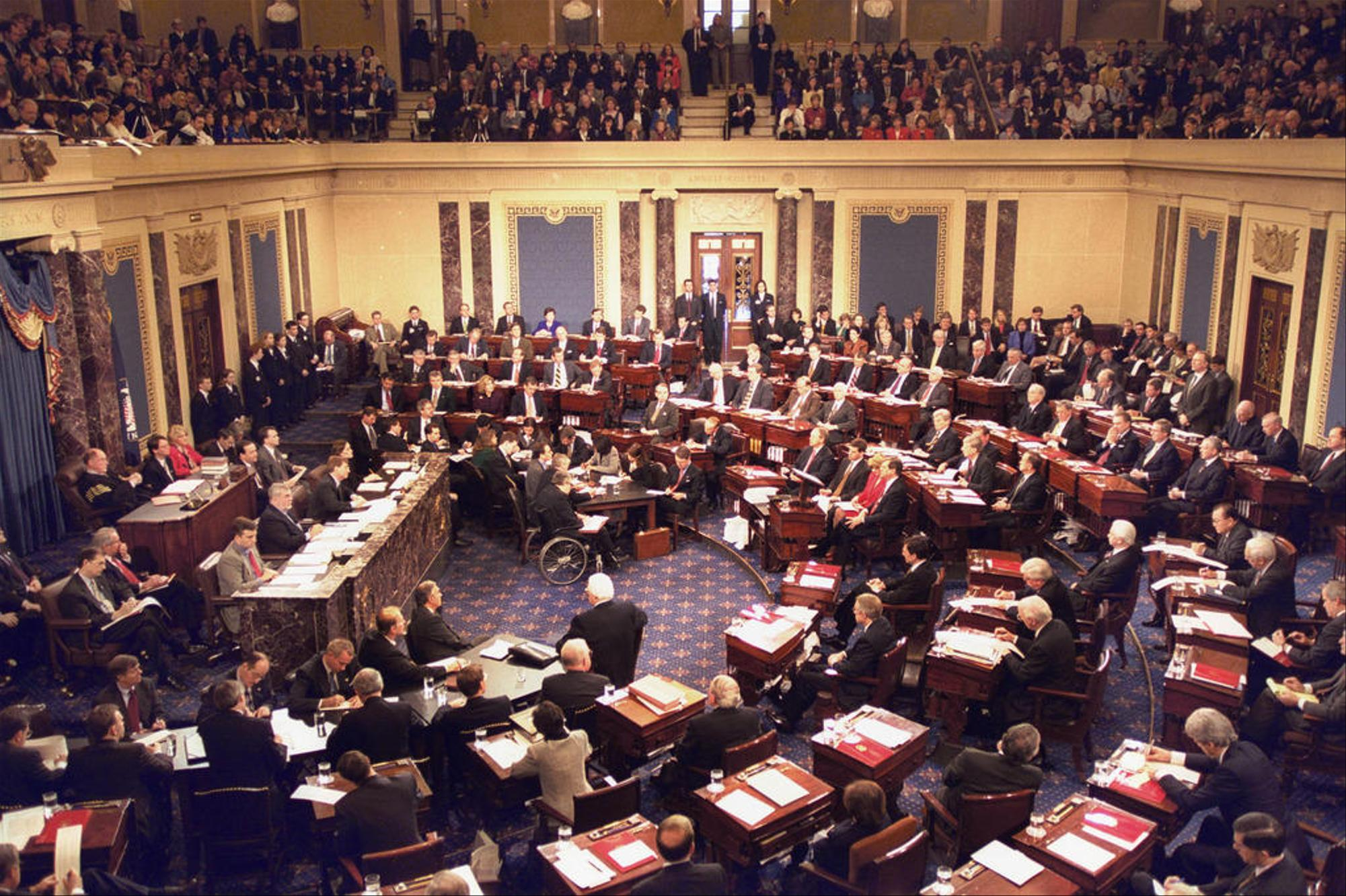
Photograph of the United States Senate Chamber during the 1999 impeachment trial of President Bill Clinton, who was acquitted and stayed in office

One of the more prominent examples of a trial being the final stage of a two-stage impeachment process is found in the United States, where this is the case both for impeachments by federal and state governments. Federal impeachment trial in the United States takes place after the United States Congress' lower chamber, the United States House of Representatives, has voted to "impeach" an official. The impeachment trial takes place in the upper chamber of the United States Congress, the United States Senate, with members of that body serving as jurors in the trial. all fifty state governments in the United States have impeachment processes, and all hold trials as part of their processes. Most states follow the same model as the United States federal government of having the lower chamber of their legislatures hold a vote to "impeach", thereby triggering an impeachment trial held in the upper chamber of their legislatures. However, several states do differ from the convention of holding the impeachment trial in the state legislature’s upper chamber. In a reverse, in Alaska it is the upper chamber of the legislature that votes to impeach while the lower chamber acts as the court of impeachment. In Missouri, after the lower chamber votes to impeach, an impeachment trial is held before the Supreme Court of Missouri, except for members of that court or for governors, whose impeachments are to be tried by a panel of seven judges (requiring a vote of five judges to convict), with the members of the panel being selected by the upper legislative chamber, the Missouri State Senate. In Nebraska, which has a unicameral legislature, after the Nebraska Legislature votes to impeach, an impeachment trial takes place before the Nebraska Supreme Court. In Oklahoma, after an impeachment vote, both chambers of the Oklahoma Legislature act together as a court of impeachment in a joint session. In addition to all the members of its upper chamber, the state of New York's Court of the Trial of Impeachments also includes all seven members of the state's highest court, the New York Court of Appeals. Other governments in the United States also utilize impeachment trials in impeachment processes, one example being many tribal governments.

=== Denmark ===
Denmark has a Court of Impeachment, a formal court dedicated to holding impeachment trials. After a vote to "impeach" by the Danish Parliament, officials go before this court. The court consists of the fifteen most senior justices on the Danish Supreme Court as well as fifteen further members selected by the Danish Parliament. The members appointed by Parliament serve on the court for six-year terms, and members of the Parliament cannot serve or be chosen to serve on the panel.

=== France ===
France’s procedure of "destitution" (a process to remove the president of France which is similar to impeachment) has a slightly similar process to the United States with a two-stage process that involves a legislative body acting as a "court" in the second stage. After the destitution process is formally acknowledged by both chambers of the legislature, completing the first step, the two chambers together form a "High Court" tasked with reaching a verdict on whether to remove the president.

=== Hungary ===
Hungary also has a two-stage process for removal of a president through impeachment. After a president is impeached, their powers are suspended and proceedings are held before the Constitutional Court of Hungary, which is tasked with reaching a decision on whether or not to remove the president from office.

=== Italy ===
In Italy, after a president is impeached through a majority vote of the Parliament in joint session for high treason and/or for attempting to overthrow the Constitution, the president is tried by a panel including the justices of the Constitutional Court of Italy as well as sixteen citizens older than forty chosen by lot from a list that is compiled by the Parliament every nine years.

=== Norway ===
In Norway, for impeachments, a Court of Impeachment tries impeached individuals.

=== Paraguay ===
In Paraguay, presidential impeachment similarly sees the lower chamber of the Congress of Paraguay (the Chamber of Deputies) first hold an impeachment vote, which triggers a trial in the upper chamber (the Senate), which votes as to whether to remove the president.

=== Peru ===
Several presidents of Peru have faced impeachment hearings regarded to be impeachment trials. These hearings have come following formal impeachment votes by the Congress of the Republic of Peru to launch proceedings.

=== Philippines ===
Impeachment in the Philippines functions very similarly to the United States federal impeachment as well.

=== South Korea ===
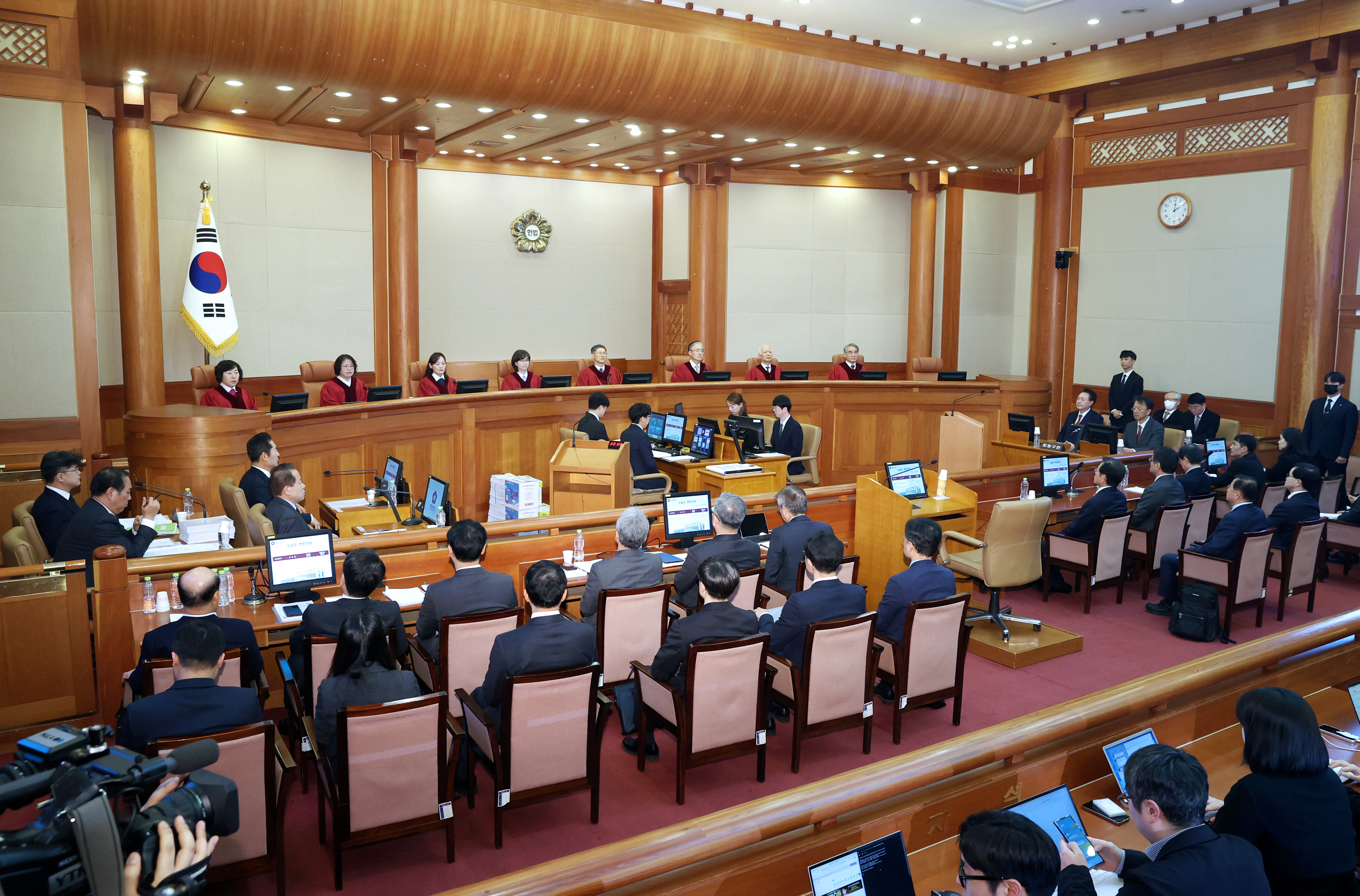
The Constitutional Court of South Korea holding a hearing in the impeachment trial for President Yoon Suk Yeol, with Yoon in attendance (on the right) as the defendant, January 21, 2025.

In South Korea, a successful impeachment vote of the President by two thirds of the National Assembly (while only a simple majority is required, for other officials) is followed by suspension of duties, while an impeachment trial in the Constitutional Court of Korea takes place. Six of the nine Constitutional Court judges must find the impeachment case valid, for the defending official to be removed from office.

=== Turkey ===
In Turkey's presidential impeachment process, the president is tried before Constitutional Court after being impeached by the Turkish Parliament.

=== United Kingdom ===
In the United Kingdom, any individual can, in principle, be prosecuted and face trial in an impeachment by the two Houses of Parliament for any crime. However, this process has long since been, in practice, rendered obsolete, and has been supplemented by other forms of oversight including select committees, confidence motions, and judicial review. The privilege of peers to trial only in the House of Lords was abolished in 1948 (see Judicial functions of the House of Lords § Trials). This power of the Parliament of the United Kingdom, while obsolete, is still considered extant.

== See also ==
- Impeachment manager
