= Croshaw =

Croshaw is a surname. Notable people with the surname include:

- Ben "Yahtzee" Croshaw (born 1983), British comedic writer, video game journalist, humorist, author, and video game developer
- Christine Croshaw (born 1942), British pianist and music teacher
- Glenn R. Croshaw (1950–2021), American politician and judge
- Joseph Croshaw (1610–1667), British planter in the Colony of Virginia
- Raleigh Croshaw (c. 1584 – 1624), British planter and politician in the Colony of Virginia
- Unity Croshaw (c. 1636–1693 or fl. 1707), British daughter of a planter in the Colony of Virginia (the first surviving European colony in North America)
