= John West III =

Colonel John West III

Member of the House of Burgesses for King William County
- In office 1702–1706 Serving with Nathaniel West, Thomas Oliphant West
- Preceded by: position created
- Succeeded by: John Waller

Personal details
- Born: after 1665 West Point Plantation, New Kent County, Colony of Virginia
- Died: before 1710 West Point Plantation, King William County, Colony of Virginia
- Spouse: Judith Armistead
- Children: Charles West (d. 1734)
- Parents: John West II (father); Unity Croshaw (mother)
- Occupation: Planter, militia officer, politician

John West III (1666–bef. 1710) inherited West Point plantation from his father, and served in the House of Burgesses, representing the newly created King William County 1702-1706. He was the eldest son of Colonel John West, and grandson of John West (governor).

== Early life ==
The first born son of Unity Croshaw, the daughter of Major Joseph Croshaw, who represented York County in the House of Burgesses and her husband Col. John West was born between 1665 and 1669. He had two younger brothers who like him also later served in Virginia's legislature, as well as owned vast estates farmed by indentured (and increasingly by enslaved) labor.

== Career ==
John West inherited the West Point plantation established by his grandfather, Governor John West, which in this man's lifetime changed from New Kent County (which his father had represented in the House of Burgesses) to in 1691 King and Queen County, before the split in 1702 which created King William County (which it remains today). In 1692, this John West was appointed justice of the peace for King and Queen County and he also served as sheriff for that county. Beginning in 1702 (the fourth session of the Assembly that began in 1700), West represented the newly formed King William County in the House of Burgesses, initially alongside his brother Nathaniel West. He also won re-election at least twice (unlike Nathaniel), and so served in the part-time legislative position alongside his brother Thomas West from 1703 to 1706. Neither brother served in the Assembly session of 1710-1712, voters instead electing John Waller and Henry Fox.

== Personal life ==
On October 15, 1695, in Elizabeth City County, he married Judith Armistead, the daughter of Captain Anthony Armistead, who after his death remarried, to John Butts of New Kent County. Their son, Charles West lived to inherit the West Point estate. His sister Susanna also reached adulthood and married William Ingram Pace.

== Death and legacy ==
West died after 1706 and before 1710, and was probably buried on his plantation near his father. The plantation under entail (either by this man's will or that of his father) passed to his son Charles, who died three decades later unmarried and without issue. Charles West bequeathed 'West Point' to his mother, and after her death to his first cousin Thomas West (son of his father's brother Thomas) "and the heirs male of his body lawfully begotten, for ever..." The entail was broken in November 1761, when a trust was established to enable 1000 acres of the land to be sold in order to purchase slaves. A courthouse fire in 1787 destroyed most county records, including his and his father's wills.

== Ancestry ==
Ancestors of John West III

William West, 1st Baron De La Warr
Thomas West, 2nd Baron De La Warr
Lady Elizabeth Strange
John West of Virginia
Francis Knollys (the elder)
Anne Knollys
Catherine Carey
John West of West Point
Henry Percy, 8th Earl of Northumberland
George Percy
Lady Katherine Neville
Anne Percy
Anne Floyd
John West III
Raleigh Croshaw
Joseph Croshaw of York
Ursula ...
Unity Croshaw
Ann Hodges
