= Impeachment in the Thirteen Colonies =

Legislative bodies in several of the Thirteen Colonies belonging to England that later formed the original states of the United States held impeachments to remove officeholders and bring other penalties. Impeachment was a process carried over from England. Unlike in modern America but similarly to the practice of impeachment in England, in at least some of the colonies, impeachment was a process that could also be used to try non-officeholders and give criminal penalties. However, in practice, the colonies primarily limited their impeachments to officeholders and punishment to removal from office. Most charges in impeachments were related to misconduct in office. Impeachments in the colonies used a similar bifurcated process to the contemporary English and modern American practice of an impeachment vote followed by an impeachment trial. Like both the English impeachment practice and modern United States federal impeachment practice, the charges would be brought by a colonial legislature's lower chamber and tried in its upper chamber.

In England itself, after falling out of fashion by the mid-15th century, impeachment began to be used again by the Parliament of England in the early 17th century. Likewise, in 1635, the Thirteen Colonies saw what has come to be considered its first impeachment action when the Colony of Virginia moved to initiate the removal of its governor, John Harvey.

The American colonies developed their own distinctive processes of impeachment. Colonial impeachments were largely limited to officeholders and misconduct that had been committed in office. Colonial impeachments inspired most of the colonies to include impeachment initial state constitutions. When the United States Constitution was authored to create a federal government, a clause was included allowing for federal impeachments.

== Individuals impeached by colonial governments ==
Date	Government	Accused	Office (and other notability)	Result	Notes	Cite
April 1635	Colony of Virginia	John Harvey	Governor of Virginia	After the colony voted to initiate a removal, Harvey was effectively suspended and was returned to England to face trial before the House of Lords, however he never faced trial as the House of Lords did not consider the colony to have the authority to initiate such an action	Removal effort has only retrospectively been considered an impeachment	
1669	Province of Maryland	John Morecroft	Member of the Assembly of Free Marylanders	Acquitted		
1676	Province of Maryland	Thomas Trueman	Member of Proprietor's Council and justice of Provincial Court	Found guilty on May 27, 1676. Removed from office; fined and released.		
May 27, 1676	Province of Maryland	Charles James	Sheriff of Caecill County, Maryland	Found guilty of battery and perjury on June 1, 1676, and removed from office; no criminal penalty given		
1682	Province of Maryland	Jacob Young	Indian interpreter	Found guilty and removed from office in 1663		
May 15, 1685	Province of Pennsylvania	Nicholas More	Chief justice of Pennsylvania	Impeachment never tried		
1706	Massachusetts Bay Colony	John Borland, Roger Lawson, William Rouse, Samuel Vetch	No office (merchant captains)	Found guilty and given criminal sentences; sentences later invalidated by the Privy Council of England		
1707	Province of Pennsylvania	James Logan	Member of the Provincial Council	Impeachment abandoned for lack of a venue described by law to try the impeachment in (law at the time had allowed for impeachment by the Assembly, but omitted prescription of a venue to try impeachments in)		
April 1719	Province of South Carolina	Nicholas Trott	Chief justice of South Carolina	Found guilty and removed	Some scholars dispute that Trott's trial and removal was formally an impeachment	
1754	Province of Pennsylvania	William Moore	Justice of the peace (also a landowner and militia leader)	Impeachment process halted after Privy Council of England ruled that the Pennsylvania Assembly did not have the authority		
1774	Massachusetts Bay Colony	Peter Oliver	Chief justice of Massachusetts	Impeachment process abandoned		

== See also ==
- Federal impeachment in the United States
- Impeachment by state and territorial governments of the United States
- Impeachment inquiry in the United States

Individual colonies:

- Connecticut Colony
- Delaware Colony
- Province of Georgia
- Massachusetts Bay Colony
- Provence of New Hampshire
- Province of Maryland
- Providence of New Jersey
- Providence of New York
- Province of North Carolina
- Province of Pennsylvania
- Province of South Carolina
- Colony of Rhode Island and Providence Plantations
- Colony of Virginia
