= John West (governor) =

Colonial governor of Virginia

6th Crown Governor of Virginia
- In office 1629–1630
- Preceded by: John Pott
- Succeeded by: Francis Wyatt

Member of the House of Burgesses for the Plantations over the Water
- In office 1628–1630 Serving with John Burland, Robert Fellgate
- Preceded by: Edward Blaney
- Succeeded by: constituency abolished

Personal details
- Born: December 14, 1590 Testwood, Hampshire, England
- Died: c. 1659
- Spouse: Anne
- Children: John West
- Parent(s): Thomas West, 2nd Baron De La Warr; Anne Knollys
- Profession: Governor
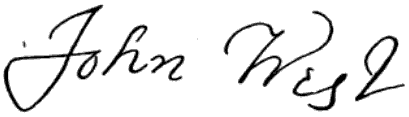
- Signature

John West (December 14, 1590 – c. 1659) was an early member of the Virginia General Assembly and acting colonial Governor of Virginia from 1635 to 1637, the third West brother to serve as Governor and one of the founders of the West Family of Virginia, which would include many politicians.

== Early and family life ==
The fifth son and twelfth child of Thomas West, 2nd Baron De La Warr, was born at Testwood in Hampshire, England. His brother Thomas West, 3rd Baron De La Warr was the largest investor in the London Company which received a charter to establish settlers in the New World, then financed several voyages, including those which founded a settlement at Jamestown in 1609. Thomas West, Lord Delaware, was the first governor of what became the Virginia colony, serving from 1608 until 1618. However, first John West was educated, including beginning in 1609 at Magdalen College, from which he received a degree in 1613.

== Virginia ==
John West arrived in Virginia on the Bonny Bess, a small supply ship that departed England in April and arrived in Virginia in August of 1624., several years after his brother Francis West who served on the Governor's Council. Fellow colonists thrice elected John West a member of the House of Burgesses (1628–30), and he represented the "Plantations over the water" alongside John Burland, then Robert Fellgate, until the end of that constituency.

In 1630, authorities made the decision to plant a settlement on the York River:

"... for the securing & taking in of a tract of Land called ye fforest bordering uppon the cheife residence of ye Pamunkey King the most dangerous head of the Indian enemy ..."

John West received one of the first grants issued for this purpose, 600 acres "on the east side of Felgates". "Felgates" refers to Robert Felgate's 1632 grant of "350 acres lying at Kiskeyacke upon Pamunkey". West sold the 600 acres, along with adjoining land, to Edward Digges in 1650. It became known as the "E.D." Plantation, renamed by later owners as "Bellfield".

Meanwhile, in 1635, after the "thrusting out" of Governor Sir John Harvey, John West was chosen as temporary replacement, and served until 1637 when Harvey was restored to his position. In the spring of 1637 West was ordered to England to answer related mutiny charges in the Star Chamber, along with neighbor John Utie, Samuel Matthews (captain), and William Peirce (burgess). All four were eventually cleared, and most returned to Virginia.

In May 1651, West patented 1,550 acres even further upstream on the York River's south branch that he would later sell to Major William Lewis. West patented 850 acres further upstream on the York River in 1652, which patent was granted the following year. In 1654 West also patented 1,000 acres in Gloucester County. Thus, he owned approximately 3,300 acres near the junction of the Mattaponi and Pamunkey Rivers, which thereby become the York River. The site eventually developed into a town first called "West Point" to acknowledge his family, then for much of the 19th century was called "Delaware" to honor his brother the Baron De La Warr, before returning to the initial name of West Point. By 1655, West was living on the plantation he had established near West Point, called Richmond West Plantation.

== Marriage and children ==
Most published sources give his wife's name as Ann but surname "unknown". There are a couple of publications that state, without any source citations, that John West married Anne Percy, daughter of George Percy and Anne Floyd. Neither of these books cite any actual primary sources. Sources for George Percy do not make that claim. At least two other published books assert that George Percy died unmarried in 1632. The most authoritative source for George Percy, confirms he never married or had children, and cites as its sources the actual records of the Percy (Lords of Northumberland) family. This old myth is further addressed and discredited in detail in George Percy's profile.

West's only known son with wife Anne, Col John West, married Unity Croshaw, a daughter of Joseph Croshaw before November 1664. Their sons Thomas West and Nathaniel West also became burgesses, as did other relatives.

== Death and legacy ==
The former Governor John West died in the winter of 1659/1660, and was buried at the Jamestown church. In March 1659/1660, the Virginia Assembly passed the following act in recognition of his family's services to the colonial enterprise:

WHEREAS the many important favours and services rendred to the countrey of Virginia by the noble family of the West, predecessors to Mr. John West, their now only survivor, claim at least that a gratefull remembrance of their former merrits be still continued to their survivor, It is ordered, That the levies of the said master West and his family be remitted, and that he be exempted from payment thereof during life.

West's 3,000-acre land grant on the York River became the location of the present town of West Point, Virginia. After his death the land passed to his son John West (who also served as a burgess), then to his grandson John West III and to his great-grandson Charles West. Charles West had no issue. His will (dated 28 September 1734) left the West Point estate to his mother, and after her death to his first cousin Thomas West (son of his father's brother Thomas) "and the heirs male of his body lawfully begotten, for ever ..." The entail was broken in November 1761, when a trust was established to enable 1,000 acres of the land to be sold in order to purchase slaves.

== Ancestry ==
Ancestors of John West (governor)

Sir Thomas West, 8th Baron De La Warr
Sir George West
Eleanor Copley
William West, 1st Baron De La Warr
Sir Anthony (not Robert) Morton of Lechlade
Elizabeth Morton
Thomas West, 2nd Baron De La Warr
Thomas Strange of Chesterton
Lady Elizabeth Strange
John West
Robert Knollys
Sir Robert Knollys of Rotherfield Greys
Francis Knollys (the elder)
Thomas Peniston
Lettice Peniston
Alice Bulstrode
Anne Knollys
Thomas Cary (or Carey or Carye) of Chilton Foliat
Sir William Carey
Margaret Spencer
Catherine Carey
Sir Thomas Boleyn, 1st Earl of Wiltshire
Mary Boleyn
Elizabeth Howard

== See also ==
- Bellfield Plantation
- West Point, Virginia

Government offices
Preceded by John Harvey	Colonial Governor of Virginia; 1635–1637	Succeeded by John Harvey, George Reade (acting)
