= Unity (given name) =

Unity is a rare female given name in English-speaking countries.

- Unity Croshaw (about 1636 – fl. 1707), colonist of British Colonial Virginia, the first surviving European colony in North America
- Unity Dow, née Diswai (born 1959), Motswana lawyer, author, and human rights activist
- Unity Mitford (1914–1948), British fascist and aristocrat known for her relationship with Adolf Hitler, and a prominent supporter of Nazism, fascism and antisemitism
- Unity Phelan (born 1995), American ballet dancer
