= Robert Ellyson =

Legislator, lawyer, and physician

Member of the Virginia House of Burgesses representing James City County
- In office 1655–1656
- Preceded by: Thomas Dipnall
- Succeeded by: William Corker
- In office 1660–1665
- Preceded by: Mathew Edlowe
- Succeeded by: Robert Holt

Sheriff of Saint Mary's County
- In office January 1643 – February 1643

Personal details
- Born: Lanarkshire, Scotland (presumed)
- Died: c. 1671 James City County, Colony of Virginia, British America
- Spouse: Elizabeth (née unknown)
- Children: Gerrard • Hannah • Eleanor
- Occupation: Politician • physician • lawyer

Military service
- Branch/service: Virginia militia
- Rank: Colonel • Lieutenant Colonel • Captain • Major

Robert Ellyson (c. 1615/20–1671) was a legislator, lawyer, military officer, and physician who served as a member of the Virginia House of Burgesses representing James City County from 1655 to 1656 and from 1660 to 1665.

Ellyson was selected sheriff of St. Mary's County, investigated the Richard Ingle uprising, and served as a physician in Kent County. By 1646, he had moved to York County, Virginia and began practicing law. In 1655, he was elected a burgess for James City County and appointed a justice of Gloucester County in 1657. An officer in the Virginia militia, accepted various local positions and was re-elected as a burgess in subsequent sessions. By the 1660s, he had patented hundreds of acres on the Virginia Peninsula. Ellyson died about 1671 in James City County.

== Background ==
Ellyson's origins are disputed. He may have been born between 1615 and 1620 in Lanarkshire, Scotland, although this has not been confirmed. Ellyson's descendant, Elizabeth Allison Ervin, claimed in her family bible in the late 18th century that he was the son of Robert Allison and Sarah (née Spence) Allison, although this claim has been questioned.

According to Ervin, Ellyson's paternal grandparents were John Allison and Ellin (née Hamilton) Allison, and that following their marriage they emigrated from Lanark to Virginia prior to 1625. While a John Ellison arrived in the colony aboard the Prosperous and his wife, Ellin, on the Charitie about 1623, a familial connection to Robert Ellyson has not been verified.

Douglas W. Ellyson Wagner claimed that Ellyson was descended from Robert Elysson of Northumberland, England, and that he was a cousin of Robert Ellison, an influential member of the Merchant Adventurers of Newcastle upon Tyne and the Parliament of England. Wagner also suggested that Ellyson gained a "considerable education," although no evidence has been found to substantiate this claim.

== Pursuits as a physician ==
Ellyson initially appeared in the tax levy for Saint Mary’s Hundred, Maryland of August 2, 1642, which assessed him to pay thirty pounds of tobacco as taxation. In September of that year, he appeared in nearby Kent County, where he may also have owned land. Identified as a “barber-chirurgeon” in January 1643, Ellyson attended to patients on Kent Island. He sued several of his patients who failed to pay for his medical services.

During his residency in Virginia, Ellyson testified that he attended to Fortune Perkins when he received wounds on his arms and sides and a dislocated shoulder. In August 1661, he treated Perkins by reducing his shoulder, and he affirmed he did not how Perkins acquired his injuries. Prior to being received by Ellyson, Perkins had become the subject of an altercation in York County led by Benjamin Rucker, in which an incited multitude encouraged him by shouting "Beat out his eyes and do not let him breathe." In 1657, Ellyson received as a bequest from his friend and fellow physician, Henry Waldron of York County, "all my Library and Books whatsoever in this country and my horse together with my chest of physicall means."

== Political career ==
Elected as sheriff of St. Mary’s County, Ellyson assumed office in January 1643. His tenure lasted less than two months, until February 9, 1643. During his service as sheriff, he investigated the case of treason of Richard Ingle, who later spearheaded an uprising against Cecil Calvert, 2nd Baron Baltimore, the proprietary colony's Catholic governor, during the Plundering Time (1644–1646). Ellyson's final mention in Maryland was in February 1644.

By 1646, Ellyson had moved to York County, Virginia where he was listed as a lawyer. He settled several estates and claimed 1,030 pounds from Robert Jackson. During the 1650s, he resided in Jamestown and surrounding James City and Gloucester counties. In 1657, he was listed as a Gloucester County justice and served as High Sheriff of James City County around this time. He was elected to the House of Burgesses, the lower house of the General Assembly of Virginia, to represent the electoral constituency of James City County during the 1655-56 session, which convened in March 1654-55 and adjourned on March 10, 1655-56 and December 1, 1656. During this assembly, he served on the Leavie and Private Causes committees. From 1657 to 1658, he served as sergeant-at-arms of the House of Burgesses.

In March 1660, Ellyson was re-elected as a burgess and was appointed to a committee to act during the recess of the assembly under the direction of William Berkeley. In the same year, he was selected to serve with Walter Chiles on a Virginia Governor's Council and General Assembly committee to draft plans for the construction of the third state house at Jamestown. Ellyson and members of the committee selected a site subsequently adjoining property owned by Philip Ludwell and Robert Beverely Jr. in 1694.

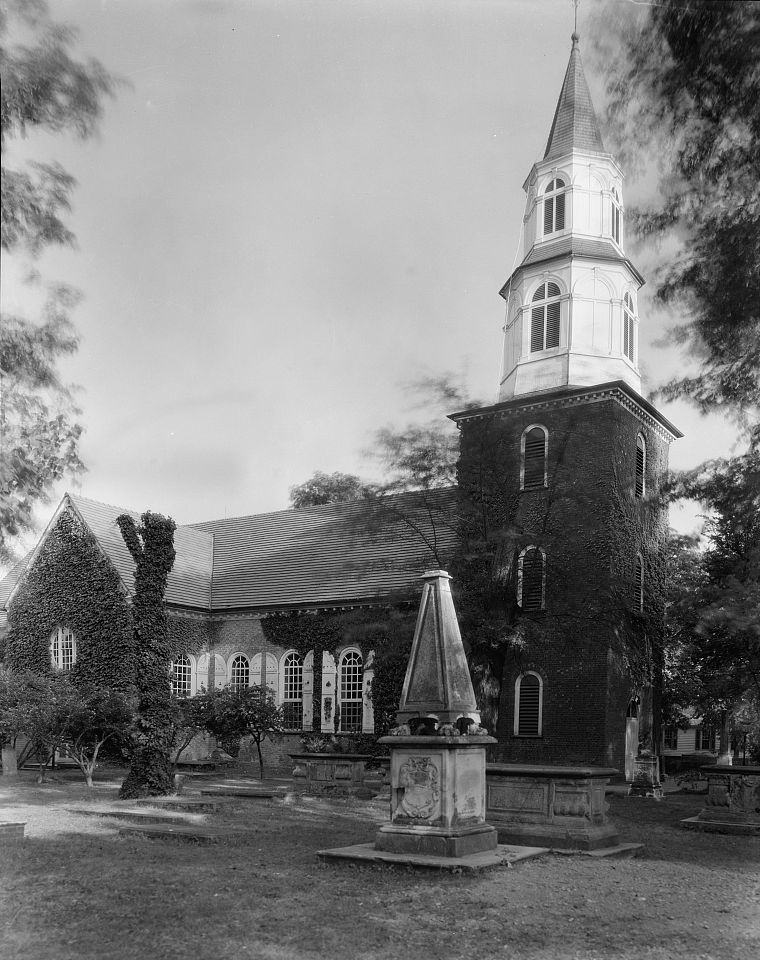
Bruton Parish, formed in 1674.

On March 23, 1661-62, Peter Beverley noted Ellyson engaged in a dispute with Joseph Croshaw concerning the boundaries of Marston and Middletown parishes. The debate concluded when the assembly ordered the boundaries to remain in accordance with York County legislation from August 25, 1656. On September 11, 1663, he was appointed to a committee to examine the elections of burgesses, and on September 19 of that year he inspected the burgesses of the "king of Potomack." To resolve a boundary dispute that had arisen on the Pocomoke River in Somerset County, Maryland, he accompanied Edmund Scarborough to consult other commissioners. While he actively participated in the local militias and was referred to as Colonel, Lieutenant Colonel, Captain, and Major, documentation concerning his military engagements are lacking.

== Landholdings ==
Following a patent for 577 acres on August 26, 1657, Ellyson increased his acquisitions by securing 377 acres in New Kent County on the narrows of the York River by importing a headright of 12 indentured servants. In addition to these holdings, Ellyson also obtained a 200-tract on a branch of Birchen Swamp in James City County. His additional property included land on Ware Creek, which he had secured by the 1660s. Following his death, several of his holdings were re-patented by his eldest son and heir, Gerrard Robert Ellyson.

Ellyson appeared to have been closely associated with Henry Soane, Speaker of the House of Burgesses. On March 10, 1653, he was listed as a headright of Soane's for a 200-acre patent in Gloucester County on the Mattaponi River. On March 25, 1656, he was listed among 32 of Soane's headrights for a 2,800-acre patent in New Kent County on the Mattaponi River. Subsequently, he assigned 1,200 acres on the Mattaponi River to him. Considering Ellyson had previously risen to prominence in Virginia by the 1650s, it has been suggested that Ellyson illegally assisted Soane in securing the aforementioned properties by arranging his inclusion in Soane's headrights.

== Marriage and family ==
Ellyson married Elizabeth (née unknown) in 1642. While it has been suggested that she was the daughter of Thomas Gerrard, a noted Catholic physician from Maryland, due to the first name of her eldest son, no documentation confirms that connection between the two families. Ellyson’s wife was a sponsor at the baptism of William Randolph, the son of Henry Randolph, on October 24, 1658. They had three children who survived into adulthood, namely Hannah (1644–1728), Gerrard Robert (1656–1749), and Eleanor (1665–1722). Gerrard Robert married Anne Myhill, the daughter of John and Mary (née Lockey) Myhill. She was the niece of Edward Myhill, a burgess representing Elizabeth City County from 1680 to 1682. Hannah married Captain Anthony Armistead, an Elizabeth City County burgess during the 1696-97 session, on July 18, 1698.

== Death and legacy ==
Ellyson may have died in September 1671 in James City County, though his exact death date is unknown. On September 28, 1671, the General Court ordered Captain George Lyall to pay a debt of 593 pounds of tobacco from Ellyson's estate to John Harloe. On October 2, 1672, Thomas Viccars was selected guardian of Ellyson's orphaned son, Gerrard Robert Ellyson.

Among Ellyson's notable descendants include John Tyler, the tenth President of the United States, and Lyon Gardiner Tyler, the 17th president of the College of William & Mary and member of the Virginia House of Delegates, who published an article concerning Ellyson in Tyler's Quarterly Historical and Genealogical Magazine in 1929. Henry K. Ellyson, Virginia House of Delegates member and the Mayor of Richmond, Virginia, and James Taylor Ellyson, the Lieutenant Governor of Virginia, were also descendants. Ellyson is a qualifying ancestor of the Jamestowne Society.
