= John West (colonel) =

American 17th century politician

Colonel John West II

Member of the House of Burgesses for New Kent County
- In office 1680–1691 Serving with Charles Turner, Richard Littlepage, Joseph Foster, William Leigh
- Preceded by: George Morris
- Succeeded by: John Lyddal

Personal details
- Born: circa 1632 Bellfield Plantation, York County, Colony of Virginia
- Died: 1691 New Kent County, Colony of Virginia
- Spouse: Unity Croshaw
- Children: John West III; Thomas West; Nathaniel West
- Parent: John West (father)
- Occupation: Planter, militia officer, politician

Colonel John West, Jr. (or John West II) of West Point, Virginia (1632–1691) was an ancient planter, commander of the New Kent Militia in the Colony of Virginia and represented the county in the House of Burgesses, as would his sons. Complicating matters, while this man sided with Governor William Berkeley during Bacon's Rebellion and had his property at West Point severely damaged, his cousin of the same name (John West, son of Anthony West) who lived on Virginia's Eastern Shore sided with the rebels and briefly (in 1676) represented Accomack County as a burgess, and received a pardon after the conflict (as well as had two sons named John and one named Jonathan with the names of his later sons Anthony and Alexander West not being used in the other West family).

== Early and family life ==
John West was born on June 6, 1632, at Bellfield Plantation, York River, Virginia. He was the child of Captain John West, Virginia Governor and his wife Ann (surname unknown). His father received an extra land grant because John was the first child of English parents born in the York River area. He had an elder brother, Nathaniel West (1622-1670/1) who was sent as a child to Borwick Hall in Lancaster, England and raised by his first cousin, Cecily West, the wife of Sir Francis Bindloss, then married and remained in the mother country. Because this man was listed as a headright by his father in 1651, he also probably traveled to England for his education, and returned in that year.

== Career ==
Like his father, John West farmed using indentured and enslaved labor. In 1659, West's father died, the last of the four sons of Thomas West, 2nd Baron De La Warr who came to Virginia. In recognition of the family's contributions to the colonial enterprise, the Virginia Assembly passed the following Act:

WHEREAS the many important favours and services rendred to the countrey of Virginia by the noble family of the West, predecessors to Mr. John West, their now only survivor, claim at least that a grateful remembrance of their former merrits be still continued to their survivor, It is ordered, That the levies of the said master West and his family be remitted, and that he be exempted from payment thereof during life.

John West also served in the militia, as was required for all white men in that era, from 1652 to 1673, receiving promotions from captain to major and ending with the rank of lieutenant colonel. West supported Governor Berkeley during Bacon's Rebellion in 1676, during which rebels imprisoned him and damaged his property. After its suppression, West also served as a member of the courts-martials which tried captured rebels. However, the rebellion caused an official investigation and the report of the Commissioners noted:

Col. John West a person greatly impaired in his stock & goods by the Rebells, and a most constant Loyall Gentleman during the late Rebellion, and was for some time after Bacons death Imprisoned by the Rebell Partie.

Beginning in 1680 until his death in 1691 West represented New Kent County (part-time) in the House of Burgesses.

== Personal life ==
By November 1664, West married Unity Croshaw, daughter of Major Joseph Croshaw of York, member of the House of Burgesses. The children of Colonel John and Unity Croshaw were:

- John West III; married Judith Armistead and lived at West Point, which in his lifetime changed from New Kent County to newly created King and Queen county in 1691 and finally in 1702 became King William County (which it remains today).
- Nathaniel West, married Martha Woodard, widow of Gideon Macon and grandmother of Martha Washington.
- Anne West; married Henry Fox.
- Captain Thomas Oliphant West (1670 West Point, VA – 23 December 1740, New Kent, VA); married Agnes Frances Estes Burton (1670–1720). They had five children.

This John West was said to have fathered a son with the Pamunkey leader Cockacoeske about 1656, several years before his marriage to Unity Croshaw. The child became known as Captain John West. Although there is evidence that Col. West was living apart from his wife in 1685, the year before Cockacoeske's death, the reasons for their separation remain unknown.

== Death and legacy ==
West died in 1691, because records show his will dated November 15, 1689, was probated in that year. However, a courthouse fire in 1787 destroyed most county records, including that will. All three of his sons would become major landowners as well as serve in the House of Burgesses.

== Ancestry ==
Ancestors of John West (colonel)

Sir George West
William West, 1st Baron De La Warr
Elizabeth Morton
Thomas West, 2nd Baron De La Warr
Thomas Strange of Chesterton
Lady Elizabeth Strange
John West of Virginia
Sir Robert Knollys of Rotherfield Greys
Francis Knollys (the elder)
Lettice Peniston
Anne Knollys
Sir William Carey
Catherine Carey
Mary Boleyn
John West of West Point
Anne

== Sources ==
- "The Powhatan Indians of Virginia: Their Traditional Culture. Rountree, Helen C., University of Oklahoma Press, 1989.
- "Cockacoeske, Queen of Pamunkey: Diplomat and Suzeraine." W. Martha W. McCartney.
- "Powhatan's Mantle: Indians in the Colonial Southeast by Peter H. Wood.
- "A General and Heraldic Dictionary of the Peerage and Baronetage of the British Empire" by John Burke, Esq. Fourth Edition. In Two Volumes. VOL. I. London: Henry Colburn and Richard Bentley, New Burlington Street. 1834. Delaware, Earl Pg. 333-335 (pdf pg. 373-375)

Notes on the ancestral pedigree of the West family: https://play.google.com/books/reader?printsec=frontcover&output=reader&id=Cq8KAAAAYAAJ&pg=GBS.PA333

- "A General and Heraldic Dictionary of the Peerage and Baronetage of the British Empire" by John Burke, Esq. Fourth Edition. In Two Volumes. VOL.I. London: Henry Colburn and Richard Bentley, New Burlington Street. 1834. House of La Warr. Pg. 335-336. (pdf pg. 375-376)

Notes on the ancestral pedigree of the La Warr family: https://play.google.com/books/reader?printsec=frontcover&output=reader&id=Cq8KAAAAYAAJ&pg=GBS.PA333
