= William Armistead (burgess) =

American lawyer and politician (1762–1799)

Member of the Virginia House of Burgesses from Elizabeth City County
- In office 1712–1716 Serving with Nicholas Curle, Robert Armistead, Henry Jenkins
- Preceded by: Francis Ballard
- Succeeded by: Thomas Wyth
- In office 1700–1710 Serving with William Wilson, Anthony Armistead, Nicholas Curle, Anthony Armistead Jr.
- Preceded by: Anthony Armistead
- Succeeded by: Francis Ballard
- In office 1692–1693 Serving with William Marshall, Willis Wilson Jr.
- Preceded by: Thomas Allomby
- Succeeded by: Anthony Armistead

Personal details
- Born: Elizabeth City County, Virginia
- Died: circa 1716 Elizabeth City County, Virginia
- Parent: Anthony Armistead (father)
- Occupation: planter, politician

William Armistead (died circa 1716) was a Virginia planter and politician in Elizabeth City County, Virginia, which he represented in the House of Burgesses for multiple terms. Complicating matters, several relatives shared the same name in the colonial era, and four more men of the same name would serve in the Virginia House of Delegates following the Revolutionary War, the first of them being William Armistead of New Kent County.

== Early and family life ==
The son of the former Hannah Ellyson and burgess Anthony Armistead (who had helped try rebels after Bacon's Rebellion), William was born into what had become one of the First Families of Virginia and received an education appropriate to his class. He was likely named for his grandfather, who had emigrated from York County in England, although previous generations had emigrated from Hesse in Germany, and so called the family's first plantation "Hesse" (at the mouth of the Pianketanke River in what was then Gloucester County, Virginia, but now is Mathews County, Virginia). His uncle John had served on the Governor's Council, and his brother Anthony Armistead Jr. also served in the House of Delegates.

He married several times, and acquired land thereby. His first wife was Hannah (1673–) the daughter of Thomas Hinde. His last wife was Rebecca, daughter of Edward Moss, a justice of the peace of nearby York County.

== Career ==
Elizabeth City County voters first elected Armistead as one of the men representing them in the House of Burgesses in 1692 and re-elected him in 1693. Although he was not reelected a second time then (his father regaining the seat), this William Armistead again won re-election in 1700 and was re-elected every year until 1710, when a court ruled that he had lost the close contest, then voters again re-elected him in 1712 and re-elected him until his death.

== Death and legacy ==
His will was dated January 5 but lacked a year. Nonetheless it was admitted to probate on February 17, the winter of 1715-1716.
