= Unity Croshaw =

American colonist

Unity Croshaw was a colonist of British Colonial Virginia, the first surviving European colony in North America. Born in the colony, she was one of five daughters of Major Joseph Croshaw, and a granddaughter of Raleigh Croshaw, who came to the Colony of Virginia in 1608 with the Second Supply to Jamestown.

== Biography ==
Unity Croshaw is believed to have been born about 1636 to Joseph Croshaw and his 1st wife, whose name is unknown. Unity was a middle child and had as many as six sisters and brothers. She married Colonel John West, son of Captain and Governor John West, sometime before 4 November 1664, at the age of about 28. As a result of the marriage, and the early death of Unity's half-brother Joseph (1667-1682), the intended heir per Joseph Croshaw's 1667 will, Croshaw's 600 acre plantation at "Poplar Neck" passed to John West. Between 1682 and 1687, a legal dispute regarding the terms of Joseph Croshaw's will between West and the widowed 2nd husband of Croshaw's 5th wife, mother of his son Joseph, Jr., delayed the final sale of "Poplar Neck". On 24 April 1687, after the York County Court confirmed all right to it to West and his wife Unity, and approved its sale, "Poplar Neck" was sold by West "and Unity his wife" to Edmund Jenings, who then renamed it "Ripon Hall".

Unity Croshaw and John West had the following children:

- John West III, married Judith Armistead, daughter of Anthony Armistead.
- Thomas West 1669–1714, married Agnes 1670-1720
- Nathaniel West, married Martha Woodward, widow of Gideon Macon.
- Anne West, married Henry Fox.

One source says Unity died after 30 October 1693, when she relinquished dower in "Poplar Neck." However, she was still living on June 20, 1707, "for on that date the Feofees of Delaware Town, King William County, conveyed to Madam Unity West, of King William County, Lot 46 in the said town."

Having married at age about 28 to John West, and her sister Rachel marrying to Ralph Graves by December of 1654, and sister Mary to Henry White by March 1660/61, there has been some debate about a possible earlier marriage of Unity. But that theory is based on circumstantial evidence, and has not yet been substantiated.

== Sources ==
- "Records of York County, Croshaw, vol. 1664-1672, p. 257"
- "Notes and Queries", The William and Mary Quarterly, Vol. 2, No. 4 (Apr., 1894)
- "Tax Rolls, March 1660. 3 March 1659."
