= George Morris (burgess) =

American politician (1616–1685)

Member of the House of Burgesses
- In office 1680–1682
- Constituency: New Kent County

Personal details
- Born: England
- Died: c. 1685 Virginia Colony
- Spouse: Eleanor Morris
- Children: William Morris, Catherine Morris (1638–1713)
- Occupation: Surveyor, Planter, Military Officer, Politician

Military service
- Allegiance: British Empire
- Rank: Major

George Morris (23 October 1616 – c. 1685) was an English born surveyor, planter, military officer and member of the House of Burgesses for New Kent County.

== Virginia career and land grants ==
It is unclear what event prompted George to move to the James River, but it could have been 1649, sailing alongside fellow Cavaliers including Major Morrison. He is mentioned in a court filing on 4 April 1661 between Harquip, chief of the Chickahomini tribe, as having surveyed a 743-acre tract alongside Lt. Col. Abrahall and James Cole on property claimed by Philip Mallory. On 2 March 1661, George Morris was requested by Lt. Col. Nathaniel Bacon to survey land claimed by Capt. Martin Palmer and John Prosyer concerning one-thousand acres.

On 14 December 1660, George Morris alongside John Pigge received 1,000 acres in New Kent County as payment for transporting 20 persons.

In 1662, then acting governor of Virginia, Francis Morrison Esq., with the consent of the Council of State granted George Morris and William Lane 2,500 acres of land in Rappahannock County. As part of the agreement, Morris and Lane agreed to transport 40 settlers from England.

19 July 1663, George Morris received 1,350 acres New Kent Co. on the North side of the Mattaponi River part thereof on the branches of Chescaack Path, the land bordered that of Anthony Arnold, payment for the transport of 15 persons. Arnold was hung on 14 March 1667 for participation in the Bacon Rebellion.

A second transaction was recorded on 19 July 1663, George Morris received 933 acres also in New Kent Co., described as "South Side of Narrows of York River upon branches of Black Creek, beginning at a corner Tree by Westover Path belonging to land of Mr. Jones and Jonathan Higby, formerly William Pullams, along land of Mr. Brereton and Anthony Arnold."

1667: 1,600 Acres. A joint grant with John Long, located on branches of Major Andrew Gilson's Creek, payment for transporting 32 settlers.

29 Apr 1668: George Morris, 860 acres, New Kent County, Stratton Major Parish, on north side of Mattapony River, by an Indian path to John Madison's house, adjoining Anthony Arnell.

8 May 1674, for 3,000 acres in (Old) Rappahannock County.

1679: 700 acres in Rappahannock County.

In 1680, George Morris founded the Jasmine Plantation located in Providence Forge. It was used as the Headquarters for the Revolutionary Army in 1779 by General George Washington.

1683: 5,000 Acres located within New Kent and Rappahannock County for transporting 40 settlers.

Of those that Morris sponsored, some were members of his extended family including Edward Morris, Anne Morris, Mary Morris, and William Morris.

== Bacon's rebellion and House of Burgesses ==
From 1676 to 1677, Nathaniel Bacon attempted to overthrow the governor William Berkeley. Morris, a Royalist and friend of Berkeley, served as a Major either before or during the revolt.

Among the co-conspirators were John Langston, who was a member of the House of Burgesses for New Kent. Langston was expelled and George Morris took his place beginning on 9 June 1680, serving on the Private Causes Committee. On George's swearing in he was listed as Major George Morris. "Major George Morris tooke the Oathes of Alleigance & Supremacie and ye oath of a Burgess which was administered to him by Mr Secretary Spencer & Colonel William Cole"

Morris served alongside Charles Turner. Morris served as a member from 1680 until 1682 and stepped down likely due to his health. He was replaced by John West. George died around 1685. West also served during the revolt as a captain.
