= Parliamentary motion to impeach Tony Blair =

Efforts to impeach the UK Prime Minister

In November 2004, a cross-party group of British members of parliament tabled a motion in the House of Commons to impeach the prime minister of the United Kingdom at the time, Tony Blair for "high crimes and misdemeanours". The motion was never debated.

== Viability ==
In the UK the most recent previous impeachment motion was made in 1848 (by Thomas Chisholm Anstey against the Foreign Secretary Lord Palmerston, who was accused of concluding a secret treaty with Russia). The campaigners first needed to establish that impeachment was still viable in modern politics. On 17 November 2004 the speaker ruled their motion in order and it was tabled for the next session.

== Initial presentation ==
In August 2004, Plaid Cymru MP Adam Price commissioned and published the report: A Case to Answer: a first report on the potential impeachment of the Prime Minister for High Crimes and Misdemeanours in relation to the invasion of Iraq. The document was written by Dr Glen Rangwala (lecturer of politics at University of Cambridge) and Dan Plesch (Honorary Fellow of Birkbeck, University of London).

== Legal opinion ==
The campaign hired solicitor Phil Shiner of Public Interest Lawyers to represent their case. They also asked Matrix Chambers to draw up a legal opinion. Matrix is known for its advocacy of human rights cases and for being the barristers' chambers of Blair's wife and Queen's Counsel, Cherie Booth. Booth was not involved in the case due to the obvious conflict of interest.

== Impeachment motion ==
Impeachment Motion – Conduct of the Prime Minister in relation to the war against Iraq

That a select committee of not more than 13 Members be appointed to investigate and to report to the House on the conduct of the Prime Minister in relation to the war against Iraq and in particular to consider;

(a) the conclusion of the Iraq Survey Group that in March 2003 Iraq did not possess weapons of mass destruction and had been essentially free of them since the mid 1990s

(b) the Prime Minister's acknowledgement that he was wrong when in and before March 2003 he asserted that Iraq was then in possession of chemical or biological weapons or was then engaged in active efforts to develop nuclear weapons or was thereby a current or serious threat to the UK national interest or that possession of WMD then enabled Iraq to inflict real damage upon the region and the stability of the world

(c) the opinion of the Secretary General of the United Nations that the invasion of Iraq in 2003 was unlawful

(d) whether there exist sufficient grounds to impeach the Rt Hon Tony Blair on charges of gross misconduct in his advocacy of the case for war against Iraq and in his conduct of policy in connection with that war.

That the Committee shall within 48 days of its appointment report to this House such resolutions, articles of impeachment or other recommendations as it shall think fit.

The legal advisers to the Speaker of the House of Commons, Michael Martin, approved the wording of the motion on 17 November 2004. The motion was tabled for the first day of the next session (the day after the Queen's Speech) on 24 November 2004. However, the main three parties forbade their MPs from signing the motion and it was never selected for debate.

If the motion had been selected, it would have allowed MPs to debate matters that parliamentary language otherwise forbids. For example, on 17 March 2005, the anniversary of going to war, Price accused Tony Blair of misleading the house. Because this breached the rules of parliamentary language, he was required to leave the House for the remainder of the day. However, such rules only apply to debate within the House. In press and radio and television interviews, other MPs have accused Blair of lying to the House and to the British people, including then opposition leader Michael Howard.

== See also ==
- British war crimes
- Casualties of the Iraq War
- Civilian casualties in the war in Afghanistan (2001–2021)
- Efforts to impeach George W. Bush – Talks and activities of a possible impeachment of George W. Bush
- Iraq War – 2003–2011 conflict in Iraq
- Opposition to the Iraq War
- Opposition to the War in Afghanistan (2001–2021)
- Taking Liberties – 2007 British documentary film
- War crimes in Afghanistan – 1979 to present, multiple conflicts
