= Thomas West (captain) =

American 18th century politician

Member of the House of Burgesses for King William County
- In office 1703–1706 Serving with John West
- Preceded by: Nathaniel West
- Succeeded by: Henry Fox

Personal details
- Born: circa 1670 West Point plantation, Colony of Virginia
- Died: circa 1710 Colony of Virginia
- Spouse: Agnes
- Children: Thomas West
- Parents: John West (father); Unity Croshaw (mother)
- Occupation: Planter, militia officer, politician

Thomas West of Poplar Neck (c. 1670 – 1710) was a planter, military officer and politician of King William County in the British Colony and Dominion of Virginia who for two consecutive terms represented the county in the House of Burgesses (1703–1706). He followed the planter, military officer and burgess traditions of his father John West and brothers John West and Nathaniel West. His wife Agnes bore a son, also Thomas West, who also served (briefly) in the House of Burgesses.
