= John Harvey (Virginia governor) =

English governor of Virginia colony

Sir John Harvey
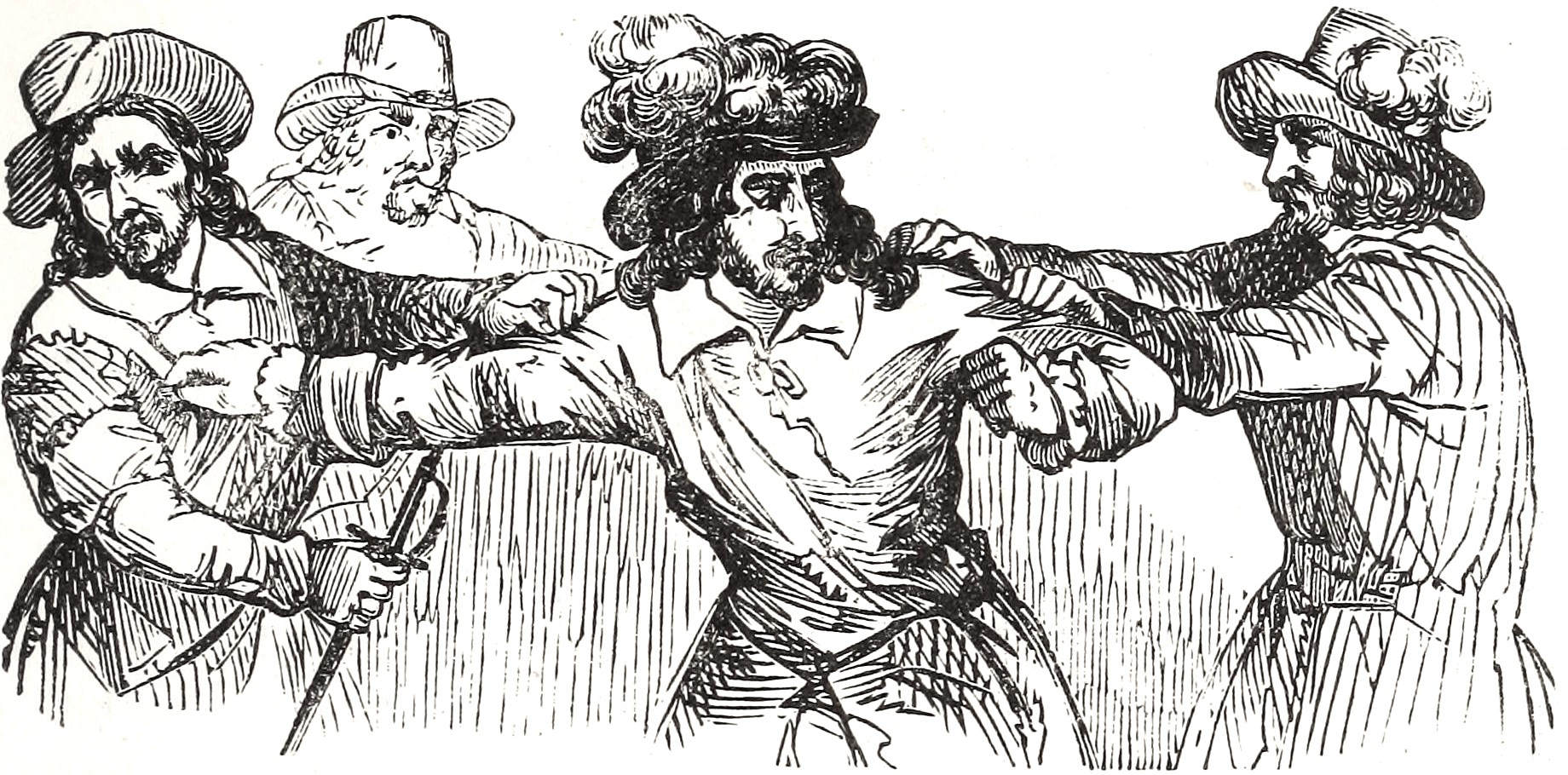
- Depiction of the arrest of John Harvey, 1635

Crown Governor
- Appointed by: Charles I of England
- Preceded by: George Yeardley
- Succeeded by: John West
- In office 1628–1635
- In office 1636–1639

Personal details
- Born: fl. 1582
- Died: 1646 Kingdom of England
- Spouse: Elizabeth Peircey [sic] Stephens (m. 1638)
- Relatives: Sir Simon Harvey (brother)
- Occupation: Sea captain

Sir John Harvey (fl. 1582 - d. 1646) was a Crown Governor of Virginia. Before becoming involved in Virginia politics, he was a transporter of settlers from England, owning a ship called the Southampton. In 1624, Harvey reported to the royal commissioner that the colony had recovered faster than expected from the Indian massacre of 1622. Harvey traveled back and forth between North America and England. Harvey was appointed to the governor position on March 26, 1628 by Charles I of England.

In autumn 1629, Harvey departed England aboard the Friendship with 300 other settlers to Virginia. Harvey appointed several inexperienced politicians, including Samuel Matthews and William Claiborne to the Virginia Governor's Council.

The captain, officers, and sailors of the ship that transported the governor to Virginia sued in admiralty court for their pay. His government has been described as tyrannical and Harvey himself has been called "an obnoxious ruler" and was generally held to be unpopular.

In 1635 Harvey was suspended and impeached by the Council of Virginia (who named John West as a temporary replacement), and he returned to England under the escort of John Pott and Thomas Harwood. He claimed a conspiracy to change the charter of the colony by John Wolstenholme was the reason for the failures of his administration.

The English precursor to the Board of Trade restored Harvey to his post in 1636. Harvey returned to Virginia in January 1637. Harvey requested transport on a royal vessel as a "mark of honor", but ended up on the unseaworthy Black George, eventually switching to a commercial ship for his return. Harvey served until November 1639.

In 1639, Harvey was replaced as governor by Sir Francis Wyatt.

Harvey married Elizabeth Peircey [sic] Stephens (widow to Harvey's rival, Richard Stephens) in 1638, and owned Boldrup Plantation for a time.

== See also ==
- Colony of Virginia
- Governor's Palace
- History of Virginia
