= Thomas Trueman =

Member of the Upper House of the Maryland Assembly
- In office 1683-1684
- Appointed by: Maryland Assembly
- In office 1671–75
- In office 1669
- In office 1666

Member of the Proprietor's Council
- In office 1683-1685
- In office 1665-1676

Justice of the Provincial Court
- In office 1683-1685
- In office 1665-1676

Sheriff of Calvert County
- In office 1662-1663

Member of the Lower House of the Maryland Assembly for Calvert County
- In office 1661-1662

Justice of Calvert County
- In office 1661-1662

Personal details
- Born: circa 1625 Nottingham, England
- Died: December 6, 1685 Trent Hall on the Patuxent River, St. Mary's County, Maryland
- Resting place: Trent Hall on the Patuxent River, St. Mary's County, Maryland
- Spouse: Mary Lashley Bogue
- Relatives: James and Nathaniel Trueman (brothers)
- Occupation: Military officer, attorney, planter, politician

Thomas Trueman (ca. 1625-December 6, 1685) was an English attorney who also became a merchant, planter, politician and controversial military officer in the Maryland Colony. He was impeached on one of three counts by the Upper House of the Maryland Assembly for killing several Susquehannock emissarys under a flag of truce months before Bacon's Rebellion in Virginia. Trueman had served in both houses of the Maryland Assembly before that conflict, and although dismissed from the Governor's Council after being impeached in 1676, he served another term in 1683–84.

== Early and family life ==
Trueman was probably born in Nottingham, England, around 1625. His father was also named Thomas Truman and the family included two additional brothers who also emigrated to the Maryland colony, as well as two daughters who remained in England. The eldest brother, Dr. James Truman (1622–1672), a physician, became a justice of the peace and commissioner in Calvert County, Maryland by 1669. He married Ann Storer and had three daughters who became this man's heirs, as discussed below. In 1665 Nathaniel Truman (d. 1676) arrived in Maryland and became a judge in Calvert County by 1669. He ultimately left his estate to his sisters Mary Truman and Eliza Stringer in England, and to this man as well as Nathaniel's sister in law Jane Skinner and the same three nieces as would this man nearly a decade later. They also had a Nottingham-born cousin, Henry Truman (1628–1696), son of Rev. Henry Truman, who emigrated to Maryland in 1677 and died about two decades later.

== Career ==
Truman emigrated to the Maryland colony as a free adult in 1651, accompanied by two servants. By 1666 he was considered a "gentleman". His emigration occurred during a tobacco boom, which ended in the early 1660s as the Navigation Acts of 1660 forced tobacco sales to be made to British merchants, which led to massive oversupply and a crash in prices. Nonetheless "Esq." was attached to Truman's name by 1667.

In 1655 Trueman (although a Protestant) was imprisoned for a role in Stone's Rebellion against the colony's Puritan government. The next year, Lord Baltimore rewarded him for his faithfulness by awarding him 1000 acres of land. By the time of his first election, he had patented 2000 acres in St. Mary's County. By the time of his death, Trueman had patented over 7,200 acres in Calvert, St. Mary's and Anne Arundel counties. Trueman became a justice of the peace in Calvert County in 1658 and continued to serve until 1662. He also served as sheriff in the 1662–1663 term, and as the county's deputy surveyor in 1665. Calvert County voters first elected Trueman as one of their representatives to the Lower House of the Maryland Assembly in 1661, and re-elected him the following year. He became a member of the Upper House in 1666 and 1669 and sat on the Aggrievances committee. In the 1671-1674 session he was on the Accounts and Laws committees). Appointed lieutenant of the local militia in 1659, Trueman was promoted to captain the following year. In 1676, he held the rank of major. Maryland's proprietor commissioned Trueman to command militiamen as well as negotiate a peace settlement with the Susquehannock tribe displaced from the upper Susquehanna River watershed by the Iroquois in 1673. Although blamed on both sides of the Potomac River for raids on European settlements that the Susquehannock said were committed by the Seneca (an Iroquoian tribe), they sought to settle along the Potomac River (nearly across from what later became Mount Vernon plantation). However, this resettlement did not have the support of the local Piscataway and Mattawoman peoples, who were already there and considered friendly by the Maryland government. On the other bank of the Potomac River, in the Colony of Virginia, local Doeg people were being displaced by English settlers. In July 1675, Thomas Hen, a herdsman who worked for Virginia planter Thomas Mathews, was found dying of apparent tomahawk wounds, and identified his attackers at Doeg. Soon local Stafford County militiamen attacked and killed 10 Doeg in revenge. Another Virginia militia group led by Colonel George Mason and Captain George Brent attacked a cabin in which some Susquehannock had taken refuge, killing 14 before one convinced Mason that they were not Doegs. By September, Major Trueman and his Maryland militia and Virginians led by Capt. John Washington and Isaac Allerton surrounded the Susquehannock fort in Maryland for seven weeks before five chiefs came out under a flag of truce. Truman's troops killed them despite the truce flag, which months later led to impeachment charges against Trueman in the Maryland Assembly. The remaining Susquehannock managed to leave under cover of darkness not long after, but continuing raids contributed to Bacon's Rebellion the following summer. Truman lost his position on the Proprietor's Council as a result of his conviction by the Upper House in 1676 on one of three counts brought by the Lower House. Perhaps as indicator of his loss of social standing, in 1677 a land dispute he and his brother Nathaniel had with Thomas Sprigg, factor for Timothy Keyser, reached the Maryland courts. However, Trueman was released from his bond for good behavior in 1678 and again appointed to the Governor's Council in 1683, so he served the remainder of the session which ended in 1684.

== Personal life ==
Trueman married Mary, the daughter of Robert Lashley (d. 1680) and widow of Capt. John Bogue (d. 1667), who survived him for about a year, but the couple had no children who survived them. She had a sister Katherine who had married Richard Brightwell, and two other sisters who married Philip Cooksey and Richard Southerne.

== Death and legacy ==
Trueman died on December 6, 1684, and was buried at the Trent Hall plantation on the Patuxent River. The estate's administrator was attorney and planter Thomas Greenfield, who had married James Trueman's daughter Martha and sat in the Upper House of the Maryland Assembly from 1708 to 1715 after representing Calvert County in the lower house in 1692-1693 and Prince George's County in the 1699–1700, 1701-1704 and 1704-1707 sessions. The other heirs were James Truman's daughters Mary who had married Thomas Hollyday (who represented Prince George's County in Maryland's Lower House in 1696), and Ann who married John Bigger (who represented Calvert County in Maryland's Lower House in 1699–1702). This Patuxent River peninsula was developed as Golden Beach beginning in 2002, but part is protected by a conservation easement.
