= Nathaniel West (captain) =

Early Virginia colonist and burgess

Lieutenant-Colonel Nathaniel West

Member of the House of Burgesses for New Kent County
- In office 1705–1706 Serving with Nicholas Merriwether
- Preceded by: Joseph Foster
- Succeeded by: John Stanup

Member of the House of Burgesses for King William County
- In office 1700–1702 Serving with John West III
- Preceded by: position established
- Succeeded by: Thomas West

Personal details
- Born: circa 1670 West Point plantation, Colony of Virginia
- Died: circa 1723 New Kent County, Colony of Virginia
- Spouse: Martha Macon
- Children: Unity West
- Parent(s): John West; Unity Croshaw
- Occupation: Planter, militia officer, politician

Nathaniel West of Poplar Neck (b. c. 1670 – d. 1723) was a planter, military officer, and politician of the English Colony of Virginia who was one of the first two representatives for King William County in the House of Burgesses, and later represented New Kent County in that legislative assembly.

== Early and family life ==
West was born into the First Families of Virginia, the third son of Colonel John West and his wife Unity Croshaw. He had a sister, like their mother named "Unity," who would marry Henry Fox, who later served in the House of Burgesses. His parents married in late 1665, and his elder brothers John West and Capt. Thomas West would also represent King William County in the House of Burgesses. The family's main plantation house, founded by his grandfather John West, was near the confluence of the Mattiponi and Pamunkey Rivers (which thereby form the York River), and the town now known as West Point, Virginia, but which beginning in 1705 was called "Delaware" to honor his relative Thomas West, 3rd Baron De La Warr.

== Career ==
Nathaniel West farmed using indentured and (increasingly) enslaved labor. He owned 2000 acres in King William County and 6370 acres in New Kent County in 1704. West traded as well as grew tobacco, and also held various local offices, particularly within the militia as required of all white males in the area. He received promotions from Captain to Lieutenant-Colonel. He became a member of the Virginia House of Burgesses: first as one of the first two representatives from King William County, Virginia (1700–1702), and in the 1703–1705 session was one of the delegates representing New Kent County) (as had his father years earlier).

== Marriage and issue ==
On May 14, 1702, Nathaniel married Martha Woodward Macon (1665–1727) in York County, Virginia. Martha was the widow of Gideon Macon, who represented New Kent County several times in the House of Burgesses. They lived at Poplar Neck plantation and had one daughter, Unity, presumably named to honor women in this man's family. The younger Unity West married, as his second wife, William Dandridge II (1689–1743),; brother of John Dandridge, both sons of Colonel John Dandridge and Bridget Dugdale. William Dandridge was appointed by George I to the Governor's Council; was a surveyor of the Dividing Line of North Carolina and Virginia. Through this marriage William Dandridge acquired Elsing Green plantation.

== Death and legacy ==
Nathaniel West died in 1723 in New Kent County, Virginia. Sources differ as to whether his widow died the same year, or remarried a man named Biggers.

Martha Woodward first married William J. Bigger and they had a son named William. Martha and Gideon did not have two sons named William together. Gideon raised William as his own son but was in fact the son of Martha and William J. Bigger who was Scotsman merchant.
