= Anthony Armistead =

Colonial Virginia planter and politician

Member of the Virginia House of Burgesses from Elizabeth City County
- In office 1693–1705 Serving with William Wilson, Mathew Watts, Willis Wilson
- Preceded by: William Armistead Jr
- Succeeded by: William Armistead
- In office November 1682 – 1684 Serving with Baldwin Shepherd, Edward Mihill
- Preceded by: Thomas Jarvis.
- Succeeded by: Thomas Allomby

Personal details
- Born: Elizabeth City County, Virginia
- Died: spring 1705 Williamsburg, Virginia
- Spouse: Hannah Ellyson
- Children: William Armistead
- Occupation: planter, politician, militia officer, justice of the peace

Captain Anthony Armistead (ca. 1645–before 1705) was a planter, militia officer, politician and Justice of the Peace in the Colony and Dominion of Virginia in the British Empire. He may be best known for participating in the courts-martial after Bacon's Rebellion in 1676, for his own multiple terms in the House of Burgesses representing Elizabeth City County, Virginia, or for increasing the wealth and political prominence of his Tidewater Virginia family.

== Early and family life ==
The youngest of three sons of William Armistead and his wife Anne, who had emigrated from Yorkshire, England to Elizabeth City County, Virginia in the 1730s. He was named to honor his English grandfather. His father proved shrewd in amassing land and influence for the family, in part by strategic marriages. His eldest brother John Armistead eventually served on the Governor's Council.

This Captain Armistead married Hannah Ellyson, daughter of Dr. (and burgess) Robert Ellyson, of James City County, Virginia and a confidente of Governor Sir William Berkeley.

Their children were:

- Lieutenant Colonel Anthony Armistead Jr., who also served in the House of Burgesses.
- Captain Robert Armistead
- Major William Armistead who married Hannah Hines (and others)
- Judith Armistead who married John West III
- Hannah Armistead who married William Shelton

== Career ==
By the mid-1670s, Armistead was a member of the Elizabeth City County Court (whose members jointly administered the county, in addition to their judicial service) and captain of the county militia. During Bacon's Rebellion he supported Governor William Berkeley and later served on a court-martial that condemned one rebel to death (by hanging). Elizabeth City County voters first elected him as one of their representatives to the House of Burgesses in the final session of the General Assembly of 1680-1682, and his initial committee assignment was to Public Claims. Voters re-elected him in 1693, at which time he introduced his first bill (regulating tanners, and which did not pass). After a brief lapse, Anthony Armistead served on every session of the General Assembly beginning in 1696 through 1700, usually assigned to the important Committee of Propositions and Grievances. In 1700 he was appointed to the committee that revised the legal code in 1705, although he died shortly before it was enacted. However, Armistead also became known for lapses ion attendance, for which received reprimands from his colleagues.

== Death and legacy ==
Anthony Armistead was in Williamsburg attending the legislative session which began on April 17, 1705 when he died, for the House asked to governor to issues a warrant for the election of a new burgess from the county on Mary 2, 1705. Two of his sons also served as burgesses, as did a son-in-law.
