= Thomas West (burgess) =

American 18th century politician

Member of the House of Burgesses for King William County
- In office 1742–1743 Serving with Francis West
- Preceded by: Leonard Claiborne
- Succeeded by: Bernard Moore

Personal details
- Born: circa 1704 West Point plantation, Colony of Virginia
- Died: 1743 Chatham County, North Carolina
- Spouse: Martha Cole
- Children: John West
- Parent: Thomas West (father)
- Occupation: Planter, militia officer, politician

Thomas West of West Point (c. 1704–1743) was a Virginia planter who like his father Captain Thomas West represented his native King William in the House of Burgesses, but only for the year before his death (1742–1743), whereupon he was succeeded by Bernard Moore. This Thomas West also inherited the 4000 acre ancestral plantation, West Point, after the death of his cousin Charles West. This Thomas West married Martha Cole, daughter of William Cole, and had children, including John West.
