= Maryland General Assembly =

Legislative branch of the state government of Maryland

Type
- Type: Bicameral
- Houses: Senate; House of Delegates
- Term limits: None

Leadership
- Senate President: Bill Ferguson (D) since January 8, 2020
- House Speaker: Joseline Peña-Melnyk (D) since December 16, 2025

Structure
- Seats: 188; 47 senators 141 delegates
- Senate political groups: Democratic (34); Republican (13)
- House of Delegates political groups: Democratic (102); Republican (39)
- Length of term: Both chambers: 4 years

Elections
- Last Senate election: November 8, 2022
- Last House of Delegates election: November 8, 2022
- Next Senate election: November 3, 2026
- Next House of Delegates election: November 3, 2026
- Redistricting: Legislative control

Motto
- Fatti maschi, parole femmine

Meeting place
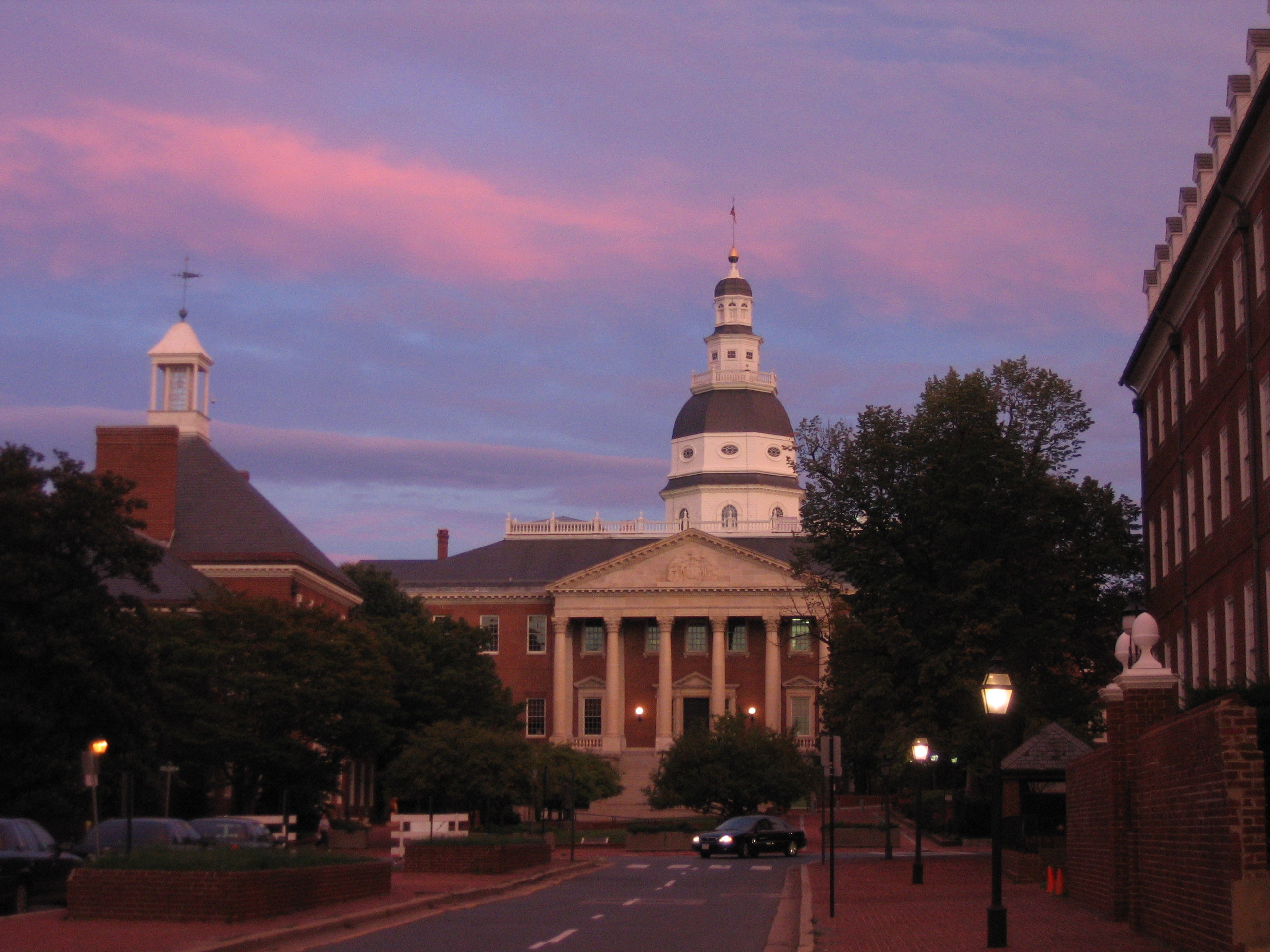
- Maryland State House; Annapolis

Website
- Maryland General Assembly

Constitution
- Constitution of Maryland

The Maryland General Assembly is the state legislature of the U.S. state of Maryland that convenes within the State House in Annapolis. It is a bicameral body: the upper chamber, the Maryland Senate, has 47 representatives, and the lower chamber, the Maryland House of Delegates, has 141 representatives. Members of both houses serve four-year terms. Each house elects its own officers, judges the qualifications and election of its own members, establishes rules for the conduct of its business, and may punish or expel its own members.

The General Assembly convenes its legislative session for 90 days each year to act on more than 2,300 bills including the state's annual budget, which it must pass before adjourning sine die. The General Assembly's 446th session convened on January 10, 2024.

== History ==
The forerunner of the Maryland General Assembly was the colonial institution, an Assembly of Free Marylanders (and also Council of Maryland). Maryland's foundational charter created a state ruled by the Palatine lord, Lord Baltimore. As ruler, Lord Baltimore owned directly all of the land granted in the charter, and possessed absolute authority over his domain.

However, as elsewhere in British North America, British political institutions were re-created in the colonies, and the Maryland General Assembly fulfilled much the same function as the House of Commons. An act was passed providing that:

from henceforth and for ever everyone being of the council of the Province and any other gentleman of able judgement summoned by writ (and the Lord of every Manor within this Province after Manors be erected) shall and may have his voice, seat, and place in every General Assembly ... together with two or more able and sufficient men for the hundred as the said freedmen or the major part of them ... shall think good.

In addition, the Lord Proprietor could summon any delegates whom he desired. In 1639, noting that Parliament had not been summoned in England for a decade, the free men of Maryland passed an act to the effect that "assemblies were to be called once in every three years at the least", ensuring that their voices would be regularly heard. During the American Revolution the colonial Assembly ceased to exist, and was replaced by its modern successor.

Starting in 1867, the Assembly became increasingly unrepresentative. As the population of Baltimore increased, it and other urban areas were not granted additional seats. By 1918, the city's population had increased 175% while the entire state gained only 46% with no reallocation of political power. Due to the COVID-19 pandemic, the General Assembly adjourned early on March 18, 2020, for the first time since the Civil War.

== Qualifications and membership ==
Each senator or delegate must be a U.S. citizen and a resident of Maryland for at least one year preceding his or her election. A prospective legislator must have resided in the legislative district the candidate seeks to represent for the six months prior to election. A senator must be at least twenty-five years of age at the time of election and a delegate at least twenty-one. Military officers other than members of the reserves are not eligible for election to the General Assembly.

Each term lasts four years. However, members of the General Assembly are not term-limited. If a vacancy occurs in either house through death, resignation, or disqualification, the Governor of Maryland appoints a replacement whose name is submitted by the State Central Committee of the same political party as the legislator whose seat is to be filled.

== Legislative districts ==
Map of Maryland house of delegates electoral districts: 3 sub-districts / 2 sub-districts / 1 sub-district; 3 dem. 2 dem., 1 rep. 1 dem., 2 rep. 3 rep. / 2 dem. 1 dem., 1 rep. 2 rep. / 1 dem. 1 rep. 1 ind.

Current partisan composition: Democratic senator Republican senator

The current pattern for distribution of seats began with the legislative apportionment plan of 1972 and has been revised every ten years thereafter according to the results of the decennial U.S. census. A Constitutional amendment, the plan created 47 legislative districts, many of which cross county boundaries to delineate districts relatively equal in population. Each legislative district elects one senator and three delegates. In most districts, the three delegates are elected at large from the whole district via block voting. However, in some more sparsely populated areas of the state, the districts are divided into subdistricts for the election of delegates: either into three one-delegate subdistricts or one two-delegate subdistrict and one one-delegate subdistrict.

== Leadership ==
The Senate is led by a President and the House by a Speaker whose respective duties and prerogatives enable them to influence the legislative process significantly. The President and the Speaker appoint the members of most committees and name their chairs and vice-chairs, except in the case of the Joint Committee on Investigation whose members elect their own officers. The President and Speaker preside over the daily sessions of their respective chambers, maintaining decorum and deciding points of order. As legislation is introduced, they assign it to a standing committee for consideration and a public hearing. The president pro tempore appoints majority and minority whips and leaders.

== Overview of legislative procedure ==
A bill is a proposal to change, repeal, or add to existing state law. A House Bill (HB) is one introduced in the House of Delegates (for example: HB 6); a Senate Bill (SB), in the Senate.

Bills are designated by number, in the order of introduction in each house. For example, HB 16 refers to the sixteenth bill introduced in the House of Delegates. The numbering starts afresh each session. The names of the sponsor (and co-sponsors, if any), the legislator who introduced the bill, becomes part of the title. Bills listed as "The Speaker (By Request of Administration)", "The President (By Request of Administration)", "Minority Leader (By Request of Administration)", or "Committee Chair (By Request of Department)" are bills proposed by the Governor and his agencies and are not proposals of the Speaker of the House, the President of the Senate, the Minority Leader, or the respective Committee Chair. They are listed with the official title of a legislator rather than the Governor due to requirements in the Maryland Constitution.

The legislative procedure, is divided into distinct stages:

- Drafting. The procedure begins when a Senator or Delegate decides to author a bill. A legislator sends the idea for the bill to the Department of Legislative Services' bill drafting division, where it is drafted into bill form. The draft of the bill is returned to the legislator for introduction.
- Introduction or First Reading. A bill is introduced or read the first time when the bill number, the name of the sponsor, and the descriptive title of the bill are read on the floor of the house.
- Committee hearing. After introduction, a bill is assigned to the appropriate policy committee, appropriate to the subject matter, for its first hearing. Notice of the hearing is published in the Maryland Register to allow for public comment. During the committee hearing the sponsor presents the bill to the committee, and testimony may be heard in support or opposition to the bill from any member of the public. The committee then votes on whether to pass the bill out of committee, or that it be passed as amended. Bills may be amended several times. It takes a majority vote of the committee membership for a bill to be passed and sent to the next committee or to the floor.
- Second reading. A bill recommended for passage by committee is read a second time on the floor of the house. Legislators, not on the committee where the bill received its public hearing, may only offer amendments to the bill at this stage. House bills in the Senate may be amended by senators on second or third reading and Senate bills in the House may also be amended on second or third reading. After all amendments are considered, the presiding officer orders the bill to be printed for third reading. This printing would include any committee or floor amendments.
- Third reading. A roll call vote is taken. An ordinary bill needs a majority vote to pass. An emergency bill requires a three-fifths vote, and a bill requiring the Maryland Constitution to be amended requires a three-fifths vote.
- Second house. If the bill receives a constitutional majority from the first house, the bill repeats the same steps in the other house. If the second house passes the bill without changing it, it is sent to the governor's desk.
- Resolution of Differences (concurrence or conference). If a measure is amended in the second house and passed, it is returned to the house of origin for consideration of amendments. The house of origin may concur with the amendments and send the bill to the governor or reject the amendments and submit it to a two-house conference committee. Appointed by the Senate President and the House Speaker, a conference committee consists of three members of each house. The committee sends a report of its recommendations to each chamber which then can adopt or reject it. If the report is adopted, the bill is voted upon for final passage in each house. If the report is rejected by either house, the bill fails.

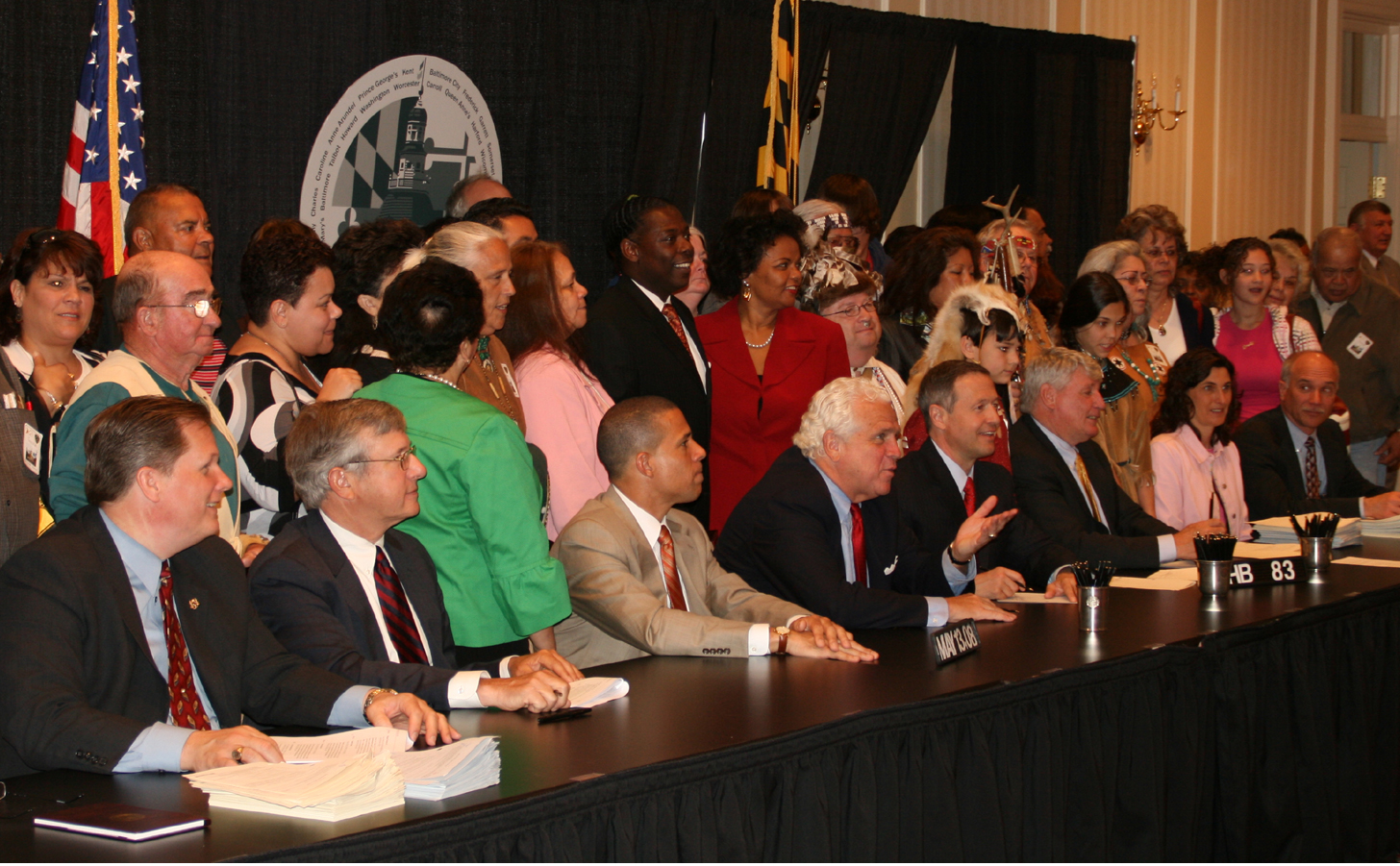
Legislators pose as Governor O'Malley signs a bill into law at a signing ceremony in Annapolis, Maryland, on May 13, 2008.

- Governor's action. All passed bills, except the budget bill and constitutional amendments, must be presented to the Governor within twenty days following adjournment of a session. The Governor may veto bills within thirty days after presentation. If a passed bill is not vetoed, it becomes law. The budget bill, however, becomes law upon its final passage and cannot be vetoed. Constitutional amendments also cannot be vetoed; they become law only upon their ratification by the voters at the next general election.
- Veto overrides. A vetoed bill is returned to the house of origin, where a vote may be taken to override the governor's veto; a three-fifths vote of both houses is required to override a veto.
- Effective date. Each bill that is passed by the Legislature and approved by the Governor is assigned a chapter number by the Secretary of State. These chaptered bills are statutes, and ordinarily become part of Maryland law. Ordinarily a law passed during a regular session takes effect October 1 of the same year. Emergency bills go into effect as soon as the governor signs them; these include acts calling for special elections and emergency measures necessary for the immediate preservation of the public peace, health, or safety.

== See also ==
- Annotated Code of Maryland: codification of the statutory laws of Maryland
- List of current members of the Maryland Senate
- List of current members of the Maryland House of Delegates
- Legislative Black Caucus of Maryland
- Impeachment in Maryland
- List of Maryland General Assemblies
