= George Percy (governor) =

Colonial Governor of Virginia

The Honourable George Percy
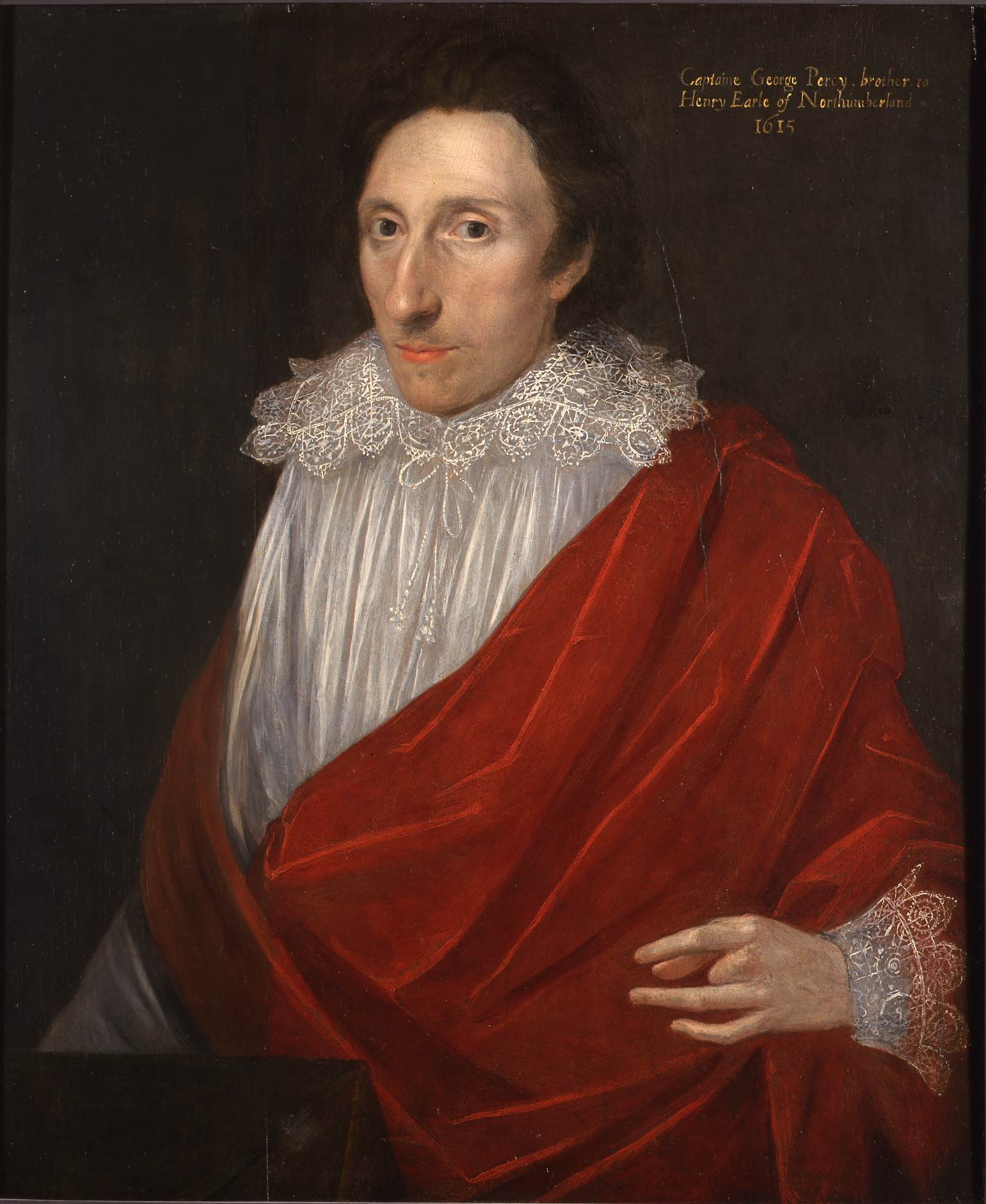
- Painting of George Percy (Syon House)

Governor of the Colony of Virginia
- In office 1609–1610
- Preceded by: John Smith
- Succeeded by: Thomas Gates
- In office 1611–1612
- Preceded by: Thomas West
- Succeeded by: Thomas Dale

Personal details
- Born: b. 1580 Kingdom of England
- Died: 1632 (aged 51–52) Dutch Republic
- Spouse: Anne Floyd
- Children: Anne Percy
- Known for: "Discourse of the Plantation of the Southerne Colonie in Virginia" (c. 1608) "True Relation of the Proceedings in Virginia" (c. 1624)

The Honourable George Percy (b. 1580 – d. 1632) was an English explorer, writer, and early Colonial Governor of Virginia.

== Early life ==
Master George Percy (sometimes written as "Percie" or "Percye") was born in England, the youngest son of Henry Percy, 8th Earl of Northumberland and Lady Catherine Neville. He was sickly for much of his life, possibly suffering from epilepsy or severe asthma. He graduated from Oxford University in 1597. While at university, he gained admission to Gloucester Hall and the Middle Temple.

Percy's vocation was the military. His first service came in the Dutch struggle for independence from Spain in the early 1600s. He also served in Ireland.

== Life in Virginia ==
Coat of Arms of George Percy

Percy was part of the first group of 105 English colonists to settle the Jamestown Colony. It is thought he was sent to the warmer climate of Virginia to benefit poor health. He departed England in December 1606 and kept a journal of his voyage. He arrived in Virginia in April 1607 and recorded the struggles of the colonists to cope with the American environment, disease, and the Powhatan Native Americans. "Thus we lived for the space of five months in this miserable distress," he wrote in his journal, "not having five able men to man our bulwarks upon any occasion."

Although Percy had a higher social rank than all of the other first colonists, he was initially denied a seat on the Virginia Council. Nevertheless, he took the lead in the early life of the colony, taking part in the expedition to the James River falls in May and June 1607. In autumn 1607, he sided with the President of the colony, Edward Maria Wingfield, who was subsequently deposed by John Ratcliffe, Gabriel Archer, and Captain John Smith. From late 1607 until autumn 1609, Percy had little power in Jamestown but served as Smith's subordinate.

When Smith left the colony in September 1609, Percy assumed the presidency of the colony. However, his persistent illness kept him from executing his office, leaving the duties of the presidency to Ratcliffe, Archer, and John Martin. It was during Percy's tenure that the colony suffered through the "Starving Time" in the winter of 1609–10. "Now all of us at James Town beginning to feel that sharp prick of hunger, which no man truly describe but he which hath tasted the bitterness thereof," he recounted later. Percy accomplished little while President, other than to order to construction of Fort Algernon at Old Point Comfort. When Sir Thomas Gates arrived in May 1610, Percy happily surrendered control of the colony to him.

In June 1610, Thomas West, 3rd Baron De La Warr arrived in Jamestown and with a commission to serve as the colony's governor. De la Warr appointed Percy to the council and named him captain of the Jamestown fort. In August 1610, De la Warre sent Percy and seventy men to attack the Paspahegh and Chickahominy tribes. The force ravaged the tribal settlements, burning their buildings, decimating their crops, and indiscriminately killing men, women, and children. Percy also led the successful defense of the Jamestown fort against a Native American attack and earned the praise of De La Warr. When the Governor returned to England in March 1611, he appointed Percy to lead the colony in his absence. "But the winds not favoring them, they were enforced to shape their course directly for England—my lord having left and appointed me deputy governor in his absence, to execute martial law or any other power and authority as absolute as himself."

Percy's term as Governor lasted until shortly before 25 May 1611, when Sir Thomas Dale, his replacement, wrote to the Virginia Company from Jamestown, that he was received by Percy, who, after hearing his commission read, surrendered up his own, 'it being accordingly so to expire.'.

On 22 April 1612, he departed Virginia for England.

== After Virginia ==
After his service as Virginia colony governor, Percy returned to England but remained interested in colonization schemes. In 1615, he proposed an expedition to Guiana but found no supporters. In 1620, he sold his four shares in the Virginia Company and returned to military service.

Percy returned to the Netherlands in 1621 when war between Spain and the Dutch Republic resumed. He was the commander of a company in the Low Countries in 1627..

Percy returned to England, where died before 19 March 1632, where and when he was buried at London St Giles without Cripplegate, Middlesex (London), England. He most likely died while living in London at Syon House, the London home of his brother the Duke of Northumberland. It was located in the Parish of St Martin in the Fields, Westminster. Syon House remains in the family of the Dukes of Northumberland, the latest of which still resides there.

== Marriage and Family ==
First, to address a long standing myth perpetuated on some more recent genealogy websites:

Only one book asserts, with no dates, places or any sources cited, that George Percy married a woman named Anne Floyd, and they had a daughter, Anne Percy, who married Governor John West. The authors also caveat this passage with: "This however, is not absolutely certain. Ann Floyd remained behind in America after her husband’s return to England". However, even their own caveat is suspect because there are no females named Percy or Floyd in the Jamestown Lists of Living & Dead in 1623, and none in the 1624/25 Muster.

These authors also contradict other, and more authoritative, published sources that do include convincing primary source references. At least two other published books assert that George Percy died unmarried in 1632. In this work, following the list of sons of the Eighth Earl, George being at the very end, are listed the three daughters of Henry Percy, the Eight Earl, and were therefore sisters of George Percy: Lady Anne Percy, who died an infant, Lady Lucy Percy and Lady Eleanor Percy. The last two married and had issue. It could be that from this list of the sisters of George Percy, misinterpreted as being his family, the myth of a wife Ann and daughter Ann may have first arisen. This author cites one of his primary sources thusly: "This account of the issue of the eighth Earl of Northumberland, so full and accurate, is chiefly given from MS Collections of the late Thomas Butler, Esq. agent to his Grace the Duke of Northumberland, and clerk of the peace for the county of Middlesex, who died 1777. The births, & c are chiefly from Petworth Register.". This seems to indicate primary sources from the family register were actually used for their work. Those manuscripts are now held privately in England, probably at The Archives of the Duke of Northumberland at Alnwick Castle.

Many more books and other sources do not mention a wife or children at all, inferring that there were neither.

Based on the two credible sources now available, one being derived from the Percy family's own Petworh Register, he clearly could not have had a wife or a daughter.

== Ancestry ==
Ancestors of George Percy (governor)

Henry Percy, 5th Earl of Northumberland
Sir Thomas Percy
Catherine Spencer
Henry Percy, 2nd/8th Earl of Northumberland
Guiscard or Wychard (or Guicciard or Richard) Harbottle of Beamish
Eleanor Harbottle
Jane (or Joan) Willoughby
George Percy
John Nevill, 3rd Baron Latymer
John Nevill, 4th Baron Latymer
Dorothy de Vere
Lady Katherine or Catherine Nevill
Henry Somerset, 2nd Earl of Worcester
Lucy Somerset
Elizabeth Browne

== Sources ==
- Jeffrey D. Groves, "George Percy," in American National Biography, ed. John A. Garraty and Mark C. Carnes (New York: Oxford University Press, 1999), 17:318–19.
- John W. Shirley, "George Percy at Jamestown, 1607–1612," Virginia Magazine of History and Biography 57 (1949): 227–43.
- Philip L. Barbour, "The Honorable George Percy, Premier Chronicler of the First Virginia Voyage," Early American Literature 6 (1971): 7–17.
- Brenan, Gerald (1902). A History of the House of Percy, from the Earliest Times Down to the Present. London: Freemantle. pp. 208–9.

Government offices
Preceded by John Smith	Colonial Governor of Virginia; 1609–1610	Succeeded by Thomas Gates
Preceded by Baron De La Warr	Colonial Governor of Virginia; 1611	Succeeded by Thomas Dale
