= Christine Croshaw =

British pianist and music educator

Christine Croshaw is a British pianist and a professor at Trinity Laban Conservatoire of Music and Dance, London, England.

== Career ==
Croshaw studied initially with Harold Craxton through an award from the composer Arthur Benjamin and was later awarded a full scholarship to study at the Royal Academy of Music, London, with Vivian Langrish and Gordon Green. As a student, she received many major awards and prizes culminating, in the coveted Chappell Gold Medal.

Croshaw has enjoyed a distinguished career as a solo pianist, chamber musician, and accompanist. She has enjoyed partnering many eminent musicians in concerts at musical centres around the world, most notably Nathan Milstein, Alan Civil, Peter-Lukas Graf, Jacques Zoon, Michel Debost, Robert Winn, Antontio Janigro and in numerous chamber music groups including the Nash Ensemble. She has performed regularly at all the major venues in London (Wigmore Hall, Queen Elizabeth Hall, Purcell Room, Kings Place, Barbican) and festivals throughout Europe and North America, including Cheltenham, Chelsea, Rye, Chichester, Edinburgh, Lichfield, Lisbon, Taormina, and Bermuda.

Croshaw's critically acclaimed series of CDs of music by Hummel (two volumes), Weber, Czerny, Dussek, and Moscheles with Meridian Records is frequently heard on BBC Radio 3 and Classic FM.

A CD of music for cello and piano by Camille Saint-Saëns was awarded 5* in 'Musical Opinion' magazine in 2011, and was a recommended recording in Gramophone magazine.

Her latest recording for Meridian Records, of piano music by Gabriel Faure, was released in 2016 to critical acclaim:

Her phrases are beautifully shaped without excessive lingering, her voicing is clear, but not exaggerated, and her naturally flowing tempos are perfectly gauged. These readings are comparable in quality to Angela Hewitt's and Jean-Phillipe Collard's.' (Fanfare magazine, USA, June 2016)

In recent years, she has devised and performed in 'Words and Music' concerts featuring some of the UK's most distinguished actors including, Edward Fox, Sir Derek Jacobi, Charles Dance, Robert Powell, Prunella Scales, and author and raconteur Sir John Mortimer.

Croshaw has developed an international reputation as an inspirational performance coach and teacher. She has been Professor of Piano, Chamber Music and Accompaniment for numerous years at Trinity College of Music, having previously taught at the Royal Academy of Music. She has also served on the teaching panels of the International Musicians' Seminar (Prussia Cove) and for numerous years at the Oxford Flute International Summer School.

Croshaw is a Master Practitioner of Neuro-Linguistic Programming (NLP), which she often incorporates into her performance coaching, helping musicians of all levels to overcome common fears, including performance anxiety, sight-reading, and lack of motivation or belief.

Among numerous awards she has received are an Associateship of the Royal Academy of Music and Honorary Fellowship of Trinity College of Music; also numerous awards and prizes for piano solo, chamber music and accompaniment.

In 2014, Christine Croshaw was awarded a Lifetime Achievement Award for her seminal contribution to music education at a dinner hosted by Classic FM and Music Teacher magazine at London's Barbican Centre.
