= Impeachment in Maryland =

In the American state of Maryland, the practice of impeachment has existed since its colonial era as the Province of Maryland and has been legally permitted during Maryland's statehood. Impeachment allows a legislative body to remove an official from office after a trial.

== Colonial-era impeachments ==
=== John Morecroft (member of the Assembly of Free Marylanders and judicial officer) in 1669 ===
In 1699, John Morecroft, a member of the Assembly of Free Marylanders (Maryland's lower house) and St. Mary's Parish judicial officeholder, was impeached by the assembly. Hoffer's impeachment was initiated by a petition brought by influential trader Robert Morris. Petition was a method of impeachment carried over from English impeachment. This means was used by Morris because Morris was not a member of the assembly himself. This petition came after Morecroft had sued Morris in provincial court for libel.

The articles of impeachment brought against Morecroft accused Morecroft of having:

1. Brought "Westminster" law to Maryland's Assembly (charges which Peter Hoffer and N. E. H. Hull write was "an example of colonial dislike for trained English Law")
2. Demanded exorbitant fees as a lawyer (implicit that he leveraged his judicial office to obtain them)
3. Simultaneously defended opposing parties in a lawsuit

The true motivation Morecroft's fellow assembly members had in bringing these charges against him, however, was that Morecroft acted as a spokesperson for the council (the upper house) during earlier debate regarding the colony's charter. Maryland's charters, patents, and statues all lacked provisions for impeachment.

The Assembly forwarded the articles of impeachment to the council. However, the Assembly diverged from English practice by not sending any impeachment managers (prosecutors) from its body. Per the research of Hoffer and Hull, this was the first impeachment in the Thirteen Colonies to lead to an impeachment trial.

During the impeachment trial before the council, in addition to refuting the charges brought against him, Morecroft centered his defense on deviations that the impeachment action had taken from what he argued to proper procedure, including the lack of impeachment managers from the Assembly. He argued that the Assembly had acted in a manner that he called, "not any ordinary and just way of impeaching." He argued that the manner that the Assembly had acted, "is prosecuted to this honourable House in such a Form and manner it is unusual in matters of this kind to be observed and prosecuted." He also argued that the matter should instead be resolved in provincial court where Morris would be able to legally sue him. The Council agreed with Morecroft's arguments, including those about improper procedure having taken place. The Council acquitted Morecroft and advised the Assembly of the procedural errors it believed had been made.

=== Thomas Trueman (Proprietor's Council member and Provincial Court justice) in 1676 ===
In 1676, Thomas Truman, a landholding aristocrat who represented Calvert County in the Proprietor's Council and the Provincial Court and was a justice of the Provincial Court, impeached by the lower house in 1876., While commissioned by the Proprietor's Council to negotiate a peace settlement with native tribes, Trueman had led a militia in a failed siege of a fortress belonging to Susquehannock natives and had ordered five sachems that were held as hostages to be executed. He had captured these sachems by luring them oput of their fortress under a deceitful flag of truce. Peter Hoffer and N. E. H. Hull wrote that the reason for impeachment by the assembly to have been "partly for his bungling, partly to placate other tribes, and partly for an obvious felony." The impeachment accused Trueman of "diverse and Sundry Enormous Crimes and Offenses", and three articles of impeachment were adopted against him. The first article, which Trueman was ultimately found guilty of in the impeachment trial, accused him of complicity in "the late barbarous and inhumane murder of five Susquehannough Indians".

Involved in the impeachment as an Assembly member was John Morecroft, who had himself been impeached years earlier. In his impeachment trial before the council, Trueman was defended by attorney Kenelm Cheseldyn. Cheseldyn's signature had, incidentally, also appeared on the articles of impeachment. Similar to Morecroft's defense in his impeachment, Cheseldyn argued on Trueman's defense that the impeachment had not followed what he insisted would be proper procedure for an impeachment. He argued that no testimony had been taken from Trueman prior to his impeachment and that the petition for the impeachment was illegal. Nevertheless, on May 26, 1676 the Council found Trueman to be guilty. The Council requested for the Assembly to pass a bill of attainder to impose criminal punishment on Trueman, proposing an execution. However, the Assembly instead desired to only impose a fine on Trueman, in addition to removing him from office. Trueman was fined, and in 1678 released under a bond for good behavior.

=== Charles James (sheriff of Caecill County) in 1676 ===
Charles James, the sheriff of Caecill County, was impeached on May 27, 1676, for battery and perjury. Peter Hoffer and N. E. H. Hull wrote that,

The indictment of James on May 27, 1676 for falsely swearing before a justice of the peace, inducting two other witnesses to follow his lead, and then assaulting another settler, Edward Pinne, may have arisen from a police officer's overzealousness or from an obscure political struggle.

Nevertheless, on June 1, 1676, the Council found James to be guilty and removed him from his office. The Council did not consider a criminal penalty.

=== Jacob Young (Indian interpreter) in 1682 ===
In 1682, Jacob Young, a Delaware resident that worked for Maryland's prominent Calvert family as an Indian (Native American) interpreter, was impeached. Peter Hoffer and N. E. H. Hull recount that Young had upset the Calverts by siding too often with the Susquehannocks. Hoffer and Hull write that,

From September 1681 to November 1683, the executive and both houses of the colonial assembly wrestled with the problem of bringing Young to justice. The issues raised in that long controversy suggest that the case against Young was no mere partisan squabble. The quasi-diplomatic role of the Indian interpreters and traders, with their powerful influence upon the tribes, affected the security of the colony. The survival of Maryland, at least in the eyes of its government, depended upon the loyalty of these men, and Young was a would-be warlord of the frontier counties.

It was first sought by the Calverts for Young to be tried for treason before a special court of oyer and terminer. Hearings before special courts of oder and terminal was a regular practice in Colonial America for quickly addressing important cases. The Council gave this some consideration, but ultimately judged against it. English statute had forbidden trials for treason to take place without two witnesses to the act in question. The Council forbid to allow any natives to testify against a white man such as Young. As of the fall of 1682, those against Young could only bring forth Colonel Henry Coursey (a fellow Indian negotiator and member of the council) to testify against Young. Since an impeachment trial was decided against, the Council suggested that the Assembly might perhaps impeach Young for "high misdemeanors". After some discussion between the two houses, the Assembly decided to impeach.

The Assembly wrote articles of impeachment. Young did not help his case by drunkenly having declared that he could do whatever he wanted in regards to natives. Hoffer and Hull write that,

The assembly impeached him for bringing the proprietary into disrepute among the Indians, urging the Northern Indians to war against the Piscattaway in the province, speaking for the Indians at times likely to cause mischief, failing to mediate between the Northern Indians and other parties according to his instructions as an officer of the government, marrying an Indian, and, in a charge specified when the case came to the upper house, leading raids against the Piscattaway. These charges were well within the scope of a "constructive treason" under the statute of 25 Edward III, but the lower house did not choose to accuse him of that offense. His crimes, if he was guilty of the charges, were nevertheless more serious than misdirected personal allegiance. One must recognize the great extra-legal power he wielded. The Northern Indians had once before brought the colony to its knees. If, in the employ of the colony, he had violated his duties as an interpreter, he could be accused of malfeasance in office. In addition, the Maryland books were filled with statutes regulating commerce with the Indians; Young seems to have ignored these laws. Finally, Maryland, like England, imposed stiff penalties on the raisers of riots and tumults. These were common in late seventeenth-century Maryland, and one gathers that Young was practiced in them.

Kenelm Cheseldyn refused to act as Young's defense. Thomas Bland was named to help Young in preparing Young's reply. On November 14, 1682, Young submitted what Hull and Hoffer characterize as having been a "rambling, highly personal, defense plea."

Young wanted Northern Indians witnesses to be permitted to testify in his defense in the impeachment trial. The Council did not allow this, but did permit for a message from them to be read. Furthermore, Bland was only permitted by the council to speak on behalf of Young if a "matter of law should arise upon trial." English precedent for impeachment did not allow for counsel to speak on behalf of a defendant.

Young was imprisoned for much of his trial. His defense ended with him petitioning for a speedy conclusion to his sufferings or freedom on bail. However, it took nearly another year, until October 1683, until a verdict was reached. The Council found Young guilty, thereby removing him from his office. The Council further requested for the Assembly to pass a bill of attainer against him, which the Assembly refused to do. The two houses then reached an agreement to pass a bill of punishment with an effective clause allowing for Young's freedom upon recognizances for his good behavior, with the further punishment of banishment.

== State impeachment law ==
Per the current language of the (fourth) Constitution of Maryland, adopted in 1867 and amended since, the House of Delegates has the sole power to impeach and all impeachments shall be tried in the Senate. An absolute majority is the threshold required for an impeachment by the House of Delegates. For impeachment trials in the Senate, all senators are required to take an oath or affirmation to "do justice according to the law and evidence." An absolute two-thirds is the threshold required for a conviction in an impeachment trial.

The constitution explicitly states that the governor and lieutenant governor and judges are subject to impeachment. It is unclear whether other officers, including local officials, can be impeached. However, a 1973 opinion written by the Office of the Attorney General of Maryland argued that the Maryland Constitution's impeachment provision can be interpreted to allow the impeachment of sheriffs. The opinion was written at the prompting of Marvin Mandel in response to a scandal involving a sheriff of Frederick County.

== Statehood-era impeachment efforts ==
In February 2022, Dan Cox, a Republican state house member who was running for governor in that year's gubernatorial election, introduced a resolution to impeach incumbent Republican governor Larry Hogan. The resolution was seen as highly unlikely to be adopted. The resolution included six proposed articles of impeachment which made dozens of allegations against Hogan. The resolution alleged that Hogan had infringed the individual liberties of Maryland residents with safety measures he imposed in the early onset of the COVID-19 pandemic, including vaccine mandates for healthcare workers, closures for non-essential businesses, and restrictions on in-person religious gatherings. The resolution also alleged that Hogan had, "awarded procurement contracts based on political relationships, misspent Marylanders’ tax dollars on unusable COVID-19 test kits, and intentionally misled the legislature and the public on the status of the inadequate test kits." It also alleged that Hogan had used disappearing message mobile applications in circumvention of state law. The resolution was referred to the House of Delegates' Rules Committee. On March 3, 2023, the House Rules Committee, without holding any debate, unanimously voted to reject the resolution.

== See also ==
- Impeachment by state and territorial governments of the United States
- Impeachment in the United States
