= Impeachment in the United Kingdom =

Ancient English/UK parliamentary procedure

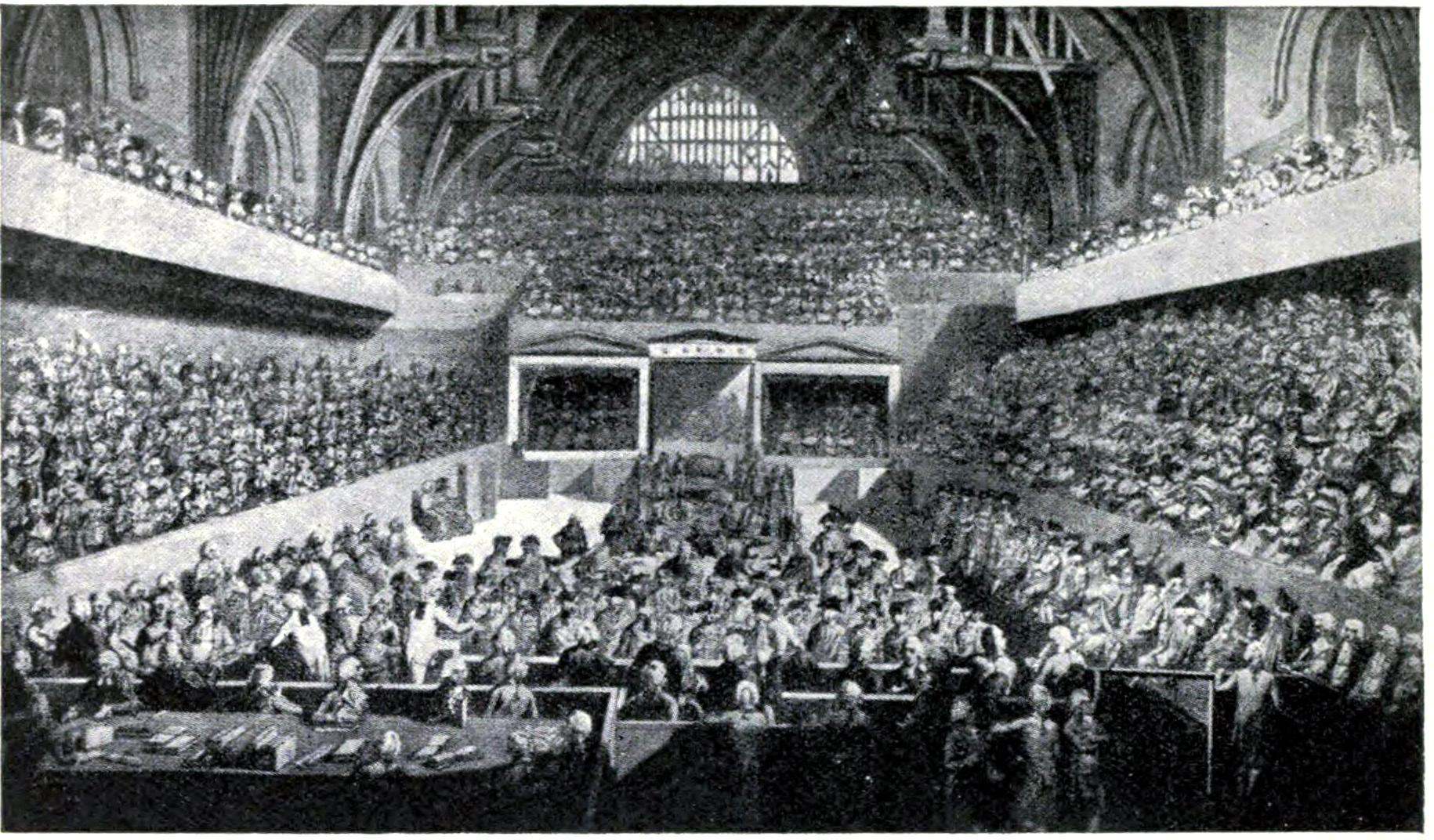
The impeachment of Warren Hastings, 1788

Impeachment is a now obsolete process in which the Parliament of the United Kingdom may prosecute and try individuals, normally holders of public office, for high treason or other high crimes and misdemeanours. First used to try William Latimer, 4th Baron Latimer, during the English Good Parliament of 1376, it was a rare mechanism whereby Parliament was able to arrest and depose ministers of the Crown. The last impeachment was that of Henry Dundas, 1st Viscount Melville, in 1806; since then, other forms of democratic scrutiny (such as the doctrine of collective cabinet responsibility and the recalling of members of Parliament) have been favoured, and impeachment has been considered as an obsolete—but still extant—power of Parliament.

This is in contrast to several other countries, where impeachment developed into a means to try officeholders for various misdeeds and has become a common process to the present day.

== Procedure ==
The procedure for impeachment was described in the first edition of Erskine May thus: any member of the House of Commons with proof of an individual's crimes could charge them of said crime and move for their impeachment. If the House of Commons voted to impeach, the mover would be ordered to go to the Bar of the House of Lords to impeach them "in the name of the House of Commons, and of all the commons of the United Kingdom" and "to acquaint them that this house will, in due time, exhibit particular articles against him, and make good the same."

In practice, the Commons would usually select a committee to draw up the charges and create an "Article of Impeachment" for each. Once the committee had delivered the articles to the Lords, replies go between the accused and the Commons via the Lords. If the Commons have impeached a peer, the Lords take custody of the accused; otherwise, Black Rod takes custody. The accused remains in custody unless the Lords allow bail. The Lords set a date for the trial while the Commons appoints managers, who act as prosecutors in the trial. The accused may defend by counsel.

The House of Lords hears the case. The procedure used to be that the Lord Chancellor presided (or the Lord High Steward if the defendant was a peer); but this was when the Lord Chancellor was both the Lords' presiding officer and head of the judiciary of England and Wales. Since both these roles were removed from that office by the Constitutional Reform Act 2005, which created the Lord Speaker of the House of Lords to preside over the Lords and made the Lord Chief Justice head of the judiciary, it is not certain who would preside over an impeachment trial today. If parliament is not in session, then the trial is conducted by a "Court of the Lord High Steward" instead of the House of Lords (even if the defendant is not a peer). The differences between this court and the House of Lords are that in the House all of the peers are judges of both law and fact, whereas in the Court, the Lord High Steward is the sole judge of law and the peers decide the facts only; and the Bishops are not entitled to sit and vote in the Court. Traditionally, peers would wear their parliamentary robes during the hearings.

The hearing resembles an ordinary trial: both sides may call witnesses and present evidence. At the end of the hearing the lords vote on the verdict, which is decided by a simple majority, one charge at a time. Upon being called, a peer must rise and declare "guilty, upon my honour" or "not guilty, upon my honour". After voting on all of the articles has taken place, and if the Lords find the defendant guilty, the Commons may move for judgment; the Lords may not declare the punishment until the Commons have so moved. The Lords may then decide whatever punishment they find fit, within the law. A royal pardon cannot excuse the defendant from trial, but a pardon may reprieve a convicted defendant. However, a pardon cannot override a decision to remove the defendant from the public office they hold.

== Legal basis ==
The UK has no codified constitution, and the legal basis for parliamentary impeachment derives not from statute law but from constitutional convention dating to 1376. As with all conventions, however, the scope of impeachment can be and has been modified by Act of Parliament.

The Act of Settlement 1701 restricted the exercise of royal power by preventing the sovereign from using the royal prerogative of mercy to nullify an impeachment: "That no Pardon under the Great Seal of England be pleadable to an Impeachment by the Commons in Parliament."

Whilst historically judges were removed by impeachment (and constitutionally still may be), the 1701 Act of Settlement provided that a judge of the High Court or the Court of Appeal may be removed by both Houses of Parliament petitioning the Sovereign. This power is now contained in Section 11(3) of the Senior Courts Act 1981: "A person appointed to an office to which this section applies shall hold that office during good behaviour, subject to a power of removal by Her Majesty on an address presented to Her by both Houses of Parliament."

== History ==
=== Instances of use ===
Parliament has held the power of impeachment since medieval times. Originally, the House of Lords held that impeachment could apply only to members of the peerage; however, in 1681 the Commons declared that they had the right to impeach anyone, and the Lords respected this resolution. Offices held "during good behaviour" are terminable by the writ of either quo warranto (e.g. R v Richardson) or scire facias, which has even been employed by and against well-placed judges.

After the reign of Edward IV, impeachment fell into disuse, the bill of attainder becoming the preferred form of dealing with undesirable subjects of the Crown. However, during the reign of James I and thereafter, impeachments became more popular, as they did not require the assent of the sovereign, while bills of attainder did, thus allowing Parliament to resist royal attempts to dominate Parliament. In 1715 the former Lord Treasurer Lord Harley was impeached for high treason, much of it relating to his agreement of the Peace of Utrecht and his alleged support for the Jacobite pretender James Francis Edward Stuart. After two years in the Tower of London he was acquitted in 1717.

The most recent cases of impeachment were of Warren Hastings, governor-general of India between 1773 and 1786 (impeached in 1788; found not guilty by the Lords in 1795), and Henry Dundas, 1st Viscount Melville, First Lord of the Admiralty, in 1806 (also acquitted). The last attempted impeachment occurred in 1848, when David Urquhart accused Lord Palmerston of having signed a secret treaty with Imperial Russia and of receiving money from the Tsar. Palmerston survived a vote in the Commons which meant that the Lords did not need to hear the case.

=== Queen Caroline ===
Queen Caroline, the consort of George IV, was tried by the House of Commons and acquitted. The process began as impeachment proceedings, but then became a different procedure as a bill of pains and penalties.

== Other parliamentary powers ==
In addition to the power of impeachment, the House of Commons claims the right to discipline offenders, both members and non-members, a right that has been accepted by the courts. John Junor, editor of The Sunday Express, was admonished in 1957 for an article which cast doubt on the honour and integrity of Members; he apologised and no further action was taken. In 1968 the House admonished one of its own members, Tam Dalyell.

== Proposals for abolition ==
The impeachment procedure has not been used for more than two hundred years, and some legal authorities, such as Halsbury's Laws of England, consider it now to be probably obsolete. The principles of "responsible government" require the prime minister and other executive officers to answer to Parliament, rather than to the sovereign. Thus the Commons can remove such officers through motions of no confidence without a long, drawn-out impeachment, although if such officers refused to stand down in such cases, it remains to be seen what other devices can be used to remove them from office other than impeachment. However, it is argued by some that the remedy of impeachment remains as part of British constitutional law, and that legislation would be required to abolish it. Furthermore, impeachment as a means of punishment for wrongdoing, as distinct from being a means of removing a minister, remains a valid reason for accepting that it continues to be available, at least in theory.

The Select Committee on Parliamentary Privilege in 1967 recommended "that the right to impeach, which has long been in disuse, be now formally abandoned". Their recommendation not having been implemented in the meantime, the Select Committee on Privileges in 1977 declared it "to be of continuing validity" and again urged that the recommendation to abolish be adopted.

The Joint Committee on Parliamentary Privilege in 1999 noted the previous recommendations to formally abandon the power of impeachment, and stated that "The circumstances in which impeachment has taken place are now so remote from the present that the procedure may be considered obsolete".

== Potential instances in modern politics ==
In April 1977 the Young Liberals' annual conference unanimously passed a motion calling on the leader of the Liberal Party, David Steel, to move for the impeachment of Ronald King Murray, the Lord Advocate, over his handling of the Patrick Meehan miscarriage of justice affair. Steel did not move any such motion but Murray (who later became Lord Murray, a Senator of the College of Justice of Scotland) agreed that the power still existed.

On 25 August 2004 the Plaid Cymru MP Adam Price announced his intention to move for the impeachment of Tony Blair for his role in involving Britain in the 2003 invasion of Iraq. He asked the Leader of the House of Commons, Peter Hain, whether he would confirm that the power to impeach was still available, reminding Hain that as the president of the Young Liberals he had supported the attempted impeachment of Murray. Hain responded by quoting the 1999 Joint Committee's report, and the advice of the Clerk of the House of Commons that impeachment "effectively died with the advent of full responsible parliamentary government".

On 29 September 2019 The Sunday Times reported that opposition politicians in the Commons were considering impeachment proceedings against the prime minister, Boris Johnson, "on charges of gross misconduct in relation to the unlawful prorogation of parliament", as well as his threat to break the law by failing to comply with the European Union (Withdrawal) (No. 2) Act 2019 (which required him in certain circumstances to seek an extension to the Brexit withdrawal date of 31 October 2019).

== See also ==
- Impeachment in the Thirteen Colonies
- Impeachment of Warren Hastings
- Impeachment of Robert Harley, Earl of Oxford
- Parliamentary motion to impeach Tony Blair
- Popish Plot
