= Gideon Macon =

American settler and political figure

Gideon (or Gedeon) Macon (c. 1648–1702) was an early American settler and political figure.

== Life in England ==
There are conflicting theories regarding Gideon Macon's lineage. The one which has been commonly set forth is that his parents were from Loire, France, (Note: The name Macon derives from Mâcon, France. The family became well-known, "occupying large estates on the Loire River and intermarrying with the prominent families", but spread beyond this area. Because Gideon Macon's family coat of arms is that of Auvergne, a family researcher speculates that his more immediate ancestors may have lived there.) but Gideon had to have either been born in England or have become an English citizen to have been permitted to come to Virginia because only English citizens could live in the colony at the time. Because his family was believed to have been of Huguenot descent, they may have lived for a time in England. Many Huguenots fled France during the French Wars of Religion.

A second theory is that Gideon Macon is the son of William Macon and Ann Garland. William was born in Nottingham, England, in 1615 and sailed to Virginia Colony aboard the merchant ship Bonaventure in 1634. There, William held a Royal Patent for 400 acres in the Powhatan County (Land Office of Patents and Grants of Virginia). William also owned a tavern house in James City. Following Bacon's Rebellion, he leased the tavern house to the Colonial Government of Virginia because its office buildings had been burned down during the rebellion. Upon William Macon's death, income from the building was paid to his widow, Ann (Garland) Macon. Upon her death in 1699, her will left items to Gideon Macon and his children. This will provides additional evidence as proof that Ann (Garland) Macon was the mother of Gideon Macon. Similar evidence is unavailable to prove that Gideon Macon is of Huguenot descent.

Gideon Macon moved to Virginia sometime before 1672.

== York County ==
The first records showing that Gideon Macon lived in Virginia come from the Court Records of York County in 1671 when he was an attorney at law.

=== Secretary to Governor William Berkeley ===
Gideon Macon's father, William Macon of James City, Virginia, (formerly of Nottinghamshire, England) owned a Tavern House. Following Nathaniel Bacon's rebellion which burned down the Virginia government offices, William rented his Tavern House to the Colonial Government of Virginia. It is possible that Gideon Macon met the governor of Virginia in this building. Following William's death in 1684, the government continued leasing the property from William's widow, Ann Macon, for "...an allowance of 12,000 pounds of Tobacco for the use of her Tavern House as committee chambers, assembly roome, clk's office, and council chamber, etc.", until her death in 1699.

Macon was secretary to Sir William Berkeley, who was appointed Governor of Virginia by King Charles I for two nonconsecutive terms. Macon's tenure came at the end of Governor Berkeley's second administration (1660–1677), and Macon served as his secretary in 1677.

=== Additional roles ===
From 1671 to 1681, Macon was also an attorney in York County, Virginia. He was a sub-sheriff of the county in 1672, under Daniel Wild, who was by some accounts his brother-in-law. He had land patents in the counties of New Kent, for 545 acres (2.21 km^{2}), Henrico for 148 acres (0.60 km^{2}), and two grants in King and Queen county for 172 and 425 acres (1.72 km^{2}).

He also served as a vestryman of Bruton Parish Church (which is located in the restored area of Colonial Williamsburg) in 1678.

== Move to New Kent County ==
=== New Residence at Mount Prospect ===
In 1680, Macon married Martha Woodward (King William County, c. 1648-?), daughter of William Woodward (England, 1620-Wright, Virginia, 1702), interpreter to the Pamunkey tribe, and wife Martha West (England, 1615-England).

Gideon Macon built a home in New Kent County (established in 1654 from York County) on Macon's Island along the Pamunkey River on land Marth Woodward inherited from her parents. He named the estate Prospect Hill or "Mount Prospect". That same year, Gideon was given the title of colonel as the commander-in-chief of the New Kent County Military.

Martha's father, William Woodward, owned a large tract of land along the Pamunkey River above Johns Creek. Martha and her sister inherited the land.

=== Churchwarden ===
In 1684 William Macon (likely Gideon's father) died, and on November 14, 1684 Gideon Macon left "a large sum" of money to the church. In the same year, he was named Churchwarden in St. Peter's Parish and was actively involved in managing affairs in that post until the time of his death. He was also commander-in-chief of the military in New Kent County.

The vestry had the duties of appointing the clergymen, investigating cases of suspected moral delinquency, and setting and collecting the parish levy to cover expenses.

The members of the vestry would rotate in the position of the churchwarden. The two churchwardens would be the representatives of the vestry. They would ensure that the church was properly maintained, collect and pay the minister's dues, and keep all the church accounts. It was also their responsibility to ensure that illegitimate children were provided for, that indigent orphans were indentured, and that the sick and elderly were lodged and boarded at the parish's expense.

=== House of Burgesses ===
Gideon Macon quickly became prominent in the affairs of New Kent County. In 1693, and from 1696 to 1702 he was elected to the General Assembly and served in the House of Burgesses.

=== Death ===
He died in Saint Peter, New Kent County. There are conflicting reports regarding Gideon Macon's burial. One report says he is buried at the foot of the chancel in Bruton Parish Church in Williamsburg. Another report says he was buried in the family plot on Macon's Island, and that the gravestone was destroyed by the Federal Army in 1862 during the American Civil War 160 years after his death.

Macon was an early Vestryman at Bruton Parish Church, and a brass tablet in the church in Colonial Williasburg marks a pew in his name.

== Other facts ==
Gideon Macon was the father of Martha Macon, who was the mother of Frances Jones. Frances was, in turn, the mother of Martha Dandridge Washington (wife of George Washington).

He was also a great-grandfather of Nathaniel Macon, who was Speaker of the House of Representatives from 1801–1808 and senator from North Carolina from 1815-1828.

Upon Gideon Macon's death in 1702, his widow, Martha Woodward Macon, married Captain Nathaniel West of West Point (named for his family), who was also a representative in the House of Burgesses. They had two children, and their daughter, Unity West, married Frances Jones's brother-in-law, William Dandridge.

== Family ==
Gideon Macon married Martha Woodward in 1680. They had eight children:

- Elizabeth Macon
- Gideon Macon (1682–c.1704)
- Ann Macon (1684 or 1685–1728) (married James Christian)
- Martha Macon Jones (1687–1716), wife of Orlando Jones, mother of Frances Jones and grandmother of Martha Dandridge (wife of George Washington). Martha Macon Jones was buried on Prospect Hill, but her remains were moved in to Bruton Parish Church in Williamsburg where they were re-interred with her original tombstone beside those of her husband.
- Unnamed daughter (b. c.1690)
- William Macon (1693 or 1694–1773)
- John Macon (1695–1752) (married Ann Hunt and was grandfather of Nathaniel Macon)
- Unnamed daughter (b. c.1698)
- James Macon (1701–1768)

== See also ==
- List of members of the Virginia House of Burgesses

== Bibliography ==
- Warren, Charles. A History of the American Bar. New York: Cosimo, 2006. Print. "Thus in York County Records, of the names of thirteen men who appeared on the docket as attorneys between 1640 and 1675, with the exception of William Sherwood (who was a trained lawyer) and John Holdcraft and William Swinnerton, all were either planters or merchants prominent in the community: Francis Willis, James Bray, Thomas Bullard, John Page and Daniel Parke becoming members of the Virginia Council; William Hockady, Thomas Bushrod, Dr. Robert Hllyson, Gideon Macon being at different times members of the House of Burgessess and Karby Kiggars. (See William and Mary College Quarterly, Vol. VIII.)
- The Edward Pleasants Valentine Papers. Richmond, Va.: Published by the Valentine Museum, 1927. Print. "Capt. John Lydall and Mr. John Parke succeeded as Church Wardens by Mr. Gideon Macon and Mr. Wm. Clopton Apr 10, 1696." P. 25.
- Hatcher, William E., and Virginia D. Cox. The Sneads of Fluvanna. Fork Union, Va.: Sneads of Fluvanna, 1959. Print. 99, 101
- Harris, Malcolm Hart. Old New Kent County: Some Account of the Planters, Plantations, and Places. Vol 1. Baltimore, Md.: Reprinted for Clearfield by Genealogical, 2006. Print.
