= Raleigh Croshaw =

Early Virginian colonist

Captain Raleigh Croshaw
- Born: c. 1580; Lancashire, Kingdom of England
- Died: c. 1624; Old Point Comfort, Elizabeth City County, Colony of Virginia
- Other name: Rawley Crashaw
- Occupations: merchant, militia officer, politician, Indian translator
- Children: Joseph Croshaw

Member of the House of Burgesses for Elizabeth City County
- In office 1624–unknown Serving with Jabez Whitakers
- Succeeded by: Francis Chamberlaine

Captain Raleigh Croshaw or Rawley Crashaw (b. c. 1580 – d. 1624) was an English merchant and early immigrant to the Colony and Dominion of Virginia who represented Elizabeth City County in the House of Burgesses in 1624.

== Virginia settler ==
Although Croshaw is believed to be from the Crashaw family of Crawshawbooth, Lancashire, England; his parentage and date of birth are not known. The Reverend William Crashaw was a member of the Virginia Company, as was William's son Richard Crashaw the poet. In any event, Raleigh (or Rawley) Croshaw [sic] arrived in Jamestown, Virginia in the Mary and Margaret, with the Second Supply in September, 1608.

First listed as a member of the Virginia Company of London in 1609, Capt. Crashaw was still listed as an adventurer in the Company in both 1618 and 1620. He was one of the authors of the complimentary verses prefixed to The Generall Historie of Virginia, New-England, and the Summer Isles (1624) of John Smith.

== Family ==
Raleigh's wife's name is unknown.

He did not name or claim or receive a headright for his wife in his land grant (see above). She is not listed on the known passenger rolls of any ship from England to Virginia. She is not listed in any of the Lists of Living and Dead, generated after the 1622 Indian massacre. She is not with him in Elizabeth City in the 1623 Census/Muster of the Colony, from which most of the ship passenger rolls were generated, as there were very few surviving actual passenger lists or manifests from those early times. Since no reference exists to Crashaw's wife, nor any other person named Croshaw or Crashaw or the like, in land transactions, court records, nor any other records in Virginia from 1608 to 1625, she presumably died before he submitted his grant application, or may have never gone to Virginia in the first place, or as some people seem to believe, without any proof, she may have been an unnamed and unacknowledged Native woman. It is known that Raleigh sometimes traveled from Virginia to Bermuda, but unknown whether he may have also returned to England at any point. There is no evidence that he was in the entourage of John Rolfe and Pocahontas when they went to England in 1616 to be introduced to the Queen and Society.

Katherine Crowshaw (Graves) (c 1585-1636), was too close to Raleigh's age to be his daughter, as was previously thought. She was the wife of Thomas Graves, whom she married c 1604/5 in England. Their eldest son, also a Thomas Graves, was born ca 1606 in England. Katherine may have been a sister, or perhaps a cousin, maybe a daughter of his presumed relative Rev. William Crashaw. There is no known evidence of her birth date or place.

His Presumed Sons

Raleigh Croshaw and his unknown wife are presumed by most researchers to have had at least three sons, Joseph and Richard as identified in Dorman, and in several York County land transactions where they are identified as brothers. A 3rd son, Noah, is identified in later York County Court records. However, these men have not been positively proved to be Raleigh's sons by any empirical evidence or reliable contemporaneous sources, only by presumption, as even Dorman notes.

- Joseph Croshaw (c1610–1667), married 5 times, the last four all being widows. 1. Unknown; 2. Widow ___ Finch, probably one of the three Finch women named as headrights by his brother Richard Croshaw in his 27 February 1649 Virginia Patent. They were Mary Finch, Elizabeth Finch, and another Mary Finch. Their relationships to the Richard, William and John Finch men who were also headrights in that same patent, is unknown.; 3. Anne ____, widow of Augustine Hodges; 4. Margaret ____, widow of Daniel Tucker; 5. Mary Ballard, widow of Thomas Bromfield.
- Noah Croshaw (c1614–1665), married Elinor (Unknown)
- Richard Croshaw (1621–1667), brother and executor for estate of Noah Croshaw in an April 1665 York County, VA proceeding, in which Major Joseph Croshaw was the Attorney for Capt Richard Croshaw. Richard married Elizabeth (unknown), named as his widow and executor for his estate, in an October 1668 York County Court proceeding.

== Indian trader and fighter ==
Raleigh Croshaw was mentioned as being a member of the group with Captain John Smith in January 1609 who, while attempting to trade for corn with the Indigenous Powhatan People at Chief Opechancanough's village, were almost overcome by a surprise attack, only to be thwarted in part by Croshaw's quick reactions.

At the time of the Indian massacre of 1622, Croshaw was trading on the Potomac River. According to Captain John Smith's General History, Croshaw challenged Chief Opchanacanough or any of his warriors to fight him naked (without armor), an offer that was not accepted. When Captain John Smith published his General History in 1624, one of the verses in Volume III of the book was written by Croshaw.

In The History of the First Discovery and Settlement of Virginia (1747), William Stith wrote, "Captain Raleigh Croshaw was in the Potomac River trading in a small bark, commanded by Captain [Henry Spilman]. There an Indian stole aboard and told them of the massacre, (1622) and that Opchanacanough had been practicing with his King and Country to betray them, which they refused to do, but that the Indians of Werowocomoco had undertaken it. Captain Spilman went there, but the Indians after seeing that his men were so vigilant and well armed, suspected that they had been discovered, therefore, to delude him, they gave him such good deals in trade, that his vessel was soon nearly overloaded."

== Ancient planter ==
His Land Grant

Important Note: The following account is slightly different from the minimal abstracts previously cited by some researchers, because it is straight from the pages of Land Patents Book 1, 1623-1643, State of Virginia. On page 2 is a typed transcript by a Virginia archivist. On page 4 is the original hand written, badly damaged and barely readable grant, digital images of the original pages of that book, digitized by the LDS Church, and now available and searchable on the FamilySearch.org website. The key difference is that there were four individuals identified in that grant, not just the three that are described in previous abstracts.

His one and only known Virginia land grant / patent application was submitted probably about Fall of 1620, shortly after the "Bona Nova" arrived that year, and was granted by the Council in about 1623. In the grant he is identified as: Captain Rawleigh Cranshaw (sic: Raleigh Crowshaw) Kecoughtan (Kecoughtan,_Virginia) Gent. "An Ancient Planter who hath remained in this country 15 years complete and performed many a worthy service to the Colony,". The total of land he claimed in his application was for 250 acres: 100 ac for "his own Adventure" and his unnamed servant who came with him in 1608, plus 100 ac for a man named George (surname unreadable, but not identified as a servant) and "his wife", previously thought to be Raleigh's wife, but now believed to be the unnamed wife of George, both of them coming at Crowshaw's expense in 1620 on the "Bona Nova", plus 50 ac for the 25 pounds sterling he had invested in the Virginia Company.

Nowhere in his grant application does he specifically name his own wife, which he surely would have done, and very explicitly, if she was in fact one of his headrights. The 250 acres he claimed was doubled by the Company to 500 acres in recognition of his 15 years of exceptional service to the Company. The 500 acres of land finally granted had to have been surveyed, on his behalf and at his expense, as part of the 2-3 year grant review and approval process, and was near Old Point Comfort, originally in James City, and now within the modern Independent City of Hampton, Virginia. One of the conditions of the grant included: for him and his said heirs and assign when he or they shall have sufficiently planted and peopled the same. In later grants and patents, that was further limited to no more than three years after the grant approval, or the patent would be void and forfeited.

He must have planted and had servants and/or slaves residing on and helping him work at least some of that 500 acre grant well before it was officially approved, as the Corporation of Elizabeth City (chartered in 1619 by the Virginia Company of London) states: "Captain Raleigh Croshaw planted by Patent 500 acres between Fox Hill and the Pamunkey River to establish Elizabeth City.". How that statement could have been in the 1619 Elizabeth City Charter is a mystery, as it was not yet patented in 1619. What is now the York River was originally called the "Pamunkee" by the Indians, then in 1634 it became the Charles River, then in 1643, when York County was formed, it was renamed to the York River.

Kecoughtan (Kiccoughtan or Kiquotan) was the first settlement in Elizabeth City (Virginia Company) County, the name of a Native American village on the site of Hampton.

In the February 1623 Lists of Living after the 1622 Indian massacre, he is listed as Capt Rawleigh Crashaw, and is in Elizabeth City, which included Old Point Comfort and Kecoughtan. In early 1624, citizens of Elizabeth City County elected Crashaw as one of the Burgesses representing them in the House of Burgesses. He was not listed in the 1625 Census / Muster of the Colony because he was on a trading mission, as follows. In March 1624/25 Crashaw received a commission to trade with the Indians for corn. On this voyage he purchased a "great canoe" for 10,000 blue beads.

His Death

Captain Raleigh Croshaw was last referred to on 27 December 1624, when Captain Francis West was ordered by General Court of Virginia to inventory the estate of Raleigh Croshaw, deceased. What happened to his 500 acres of land and who it may have passed to is unknown at this time. The details of the settlement of his estate by the Council or Court are unknown. Elizabeth City records prior to 1684 were destroyed by fires and wars, so we may never know.

== Death ==
On December 27, 1624, Captain Francis West was instructed to take an inventory of Raleigh Croshaw's estate.

Richard and Joseph Croshaw of York County (adjacent to Elizabeth City County) are listed in several records dating from the colony's first five or six decades.

By 1637, the York County settlers had already begun to breach their own palisade and move into Indian land on the other side. The area between Queens Creek and Ware Creek was called the "Indian Fields," referring to its use by Native Americans for planting corn communally. Again, it was Joseph Croshaw and Richard Croshaw who were the first to move into the area. In 1637 and 1638, they each patented a few thousand acres about where the Camp Peary government center is located today. They controlled most of the land in that area for the next 20–25 years.

== Additional sources ==
- Crowshaw, by Martha Woodroof Hiden; William and Mary Qtrly (2), XXI, pp265 70.
- The Generall Historie of Virginia, New-England, and the Summer Isles, by John Smith, 1624, Vol III, pp 78 81, Vol IV, pp. 151 154.
- The Complete Works of Captain John Smith, edited by Philip L. Barbour; Vol II, University of North Carolina Press, Chapel Hill, NC, 1986.
- Hotten's Lists, Virginia Musters.
- Letter, dated May [16], 1621, from Jabez Whittaker, in Virginia, sent to Sir Edwin Sandys, London, on the departing Bona Nova. (S.M. Kingsbury, "Records of the Virginia Company", 1933, v.III, page 297)
