= Joseph Croshaw =

American planter

Major Joseph Croshaw (c. 1610-12–1667) was a planter living near Williamsburg in the Colony of Virginia. He is believed by most historians and researchers to be the son of Captain Raleigh Croshaw. However, there does not seem to be any historical source or record to prove that relationship.

== Poplar Neck Plantation ==
There is no historical record of him in England or Virginia until his first known Virginia Land Patent on 22 May 1638, in what was then Charles River County, later renamed to York County. Because land patents could take up to 3 years after application to be surveyed, approved and recorded, this means he probably had arrived from England around 1635. He became a prominent planter and lived a few miles northeast of present-day Williamsburg, Virginia. In this May 1638 Patent, the location of that land was described as being 600 acres about 2 miles above Queen's Creek, with no other landmarks given. However, from modern maps we know the location as the mouth of the Bigler's Mill Creek and Pond. In Joseph Croshaw's later patents and deeds, including his December 1651 Patent cited below, that creek is identified as "a creek called Croshaw's Desire". A Deed of Sale from Joseph Croshaw to his brother Richard Croshaw on 12 September 1648, refers to "building a fence to secure Poplier Necke (sic: Poplar Neck)". From these several source records and facts, it is now proved that his Poplar Neck plantation existed well before 1648, and almost certainly was established by the May 1638 Patent cited above, and not in 1651 as many researchers have previously believed and have asserted.

On December 10, 1651, he appears to have re-patented the same 600 acres of land as described in his May 1638 Patent, plus an additional 400 acres he had acquired later, consolidating those tracts into his now larger Poplar Neck Plantation:

1000 a. in York Co., upon the side of York River, commonly known by the name of Poplar Neck, abutting n. w. upon the mouth of St. Andrew's Creek" (later called Carter's Creek) "n. e. upon York River, s. e. upon a small creek called Croshaw's Desire (almost exactly 2 miles above Queen's Creek, as described in the 1638 Patent above) dividing this land & the land now in possession of Richd. Croshaw into the woods, w. s. w. & by s. and s. w. along the Indian Field upon the land of Jas. Harris, w. by n. upon the land of Samuel Snead, n. w. by w. upon a line of marked trees leading along to St. Andrew's Creek.

.

After Joseph Croshaw's death in 1667, and after resolution of a contentious legal battle between John West and Joseph Croshaw's 5th wife and widow Mary, the Poplar Neck plantation came to be owned by Colonel John West through West's marriage to Croshaw's daughter Unity. On 24 April 1687, West sold what was described in the deed as 600 acres of Poplar Neck to Edmund Jenings. From its acreage described in this sale, Croshaw appears to have sold off at least part of the Poplar Neck plantation before he died, leaving only the 600 acres of the original May 1638 Patent.

== Family ==
Joseph Croshaw married five times, the last four all being widows, and had eight children

1. The name of his first wife (m c1631) English wife's name was not recorded in Early VA History and is unknown. See: William & Mary Historical journal.

Joseph Croshaw is often, but erroneously, connected to Elizabeth Yeardley, daughter of Governor Sir George Yeardley and Temperance Flowerdew. None of the scholarly books on either the Yeardley or the Croshaw families make this claim. There is in fact strong evidence that disproves that assertion: a) Soon after both of her parents died, she was sent to England, along with her two young brothers, to reside with their designated uncle and guardian, per George Yeardley's will, his brother Ralph Yeardley. b) She was born c1618, per her age in the 1624 Census/Muster of the Colony. So she would have been only 13 years old when Joseph Croshaw started having children with his first unknown wife in 1631.

Croshaw's children by his first wife (all dates estimated / presumed, none supported by any sources) were:

- Mary Croshaw (c1631-1687), married 1. Henry White; 2. Thomas Taylor.
- Ursula Croshaw, (c1633-before Nov 1664) married Robert Blackwell (c1620-before Nov 1664)
- Rachel Croshaw (c1635-1670), married 1. Ralph Graves (grandson of Captain Thomas Graves); and 2. Richard Barnes.
- Betty Croshaw (c1636-1637), died young
- Unity Croshaw (c1636-1707), married Colonel John West.
- Benjamin Croshaw (c1640-c1659), died without issue.
- Joseph Croshaw (c1642-c1650), died young.

A Richard Croshaw, previously believed to be his son, has since been disproved, as there are no supporting sources for him, and he had been confused and conflated with Joseph Croshaw's brother Richard Croshaw due to an erroneously transcribed York County court record.

2. Widow Finch. She was probably one of the three Finch women named as headrights by his brother Richard Croshaw in a 27 February 1649 Virginia Land Patent. They were Mary Finch, Elizabeth Finch, and another Mary Finch. Their respective relationships to the Richard, William and John Finch men who were also headrights in that same patent, is unknown.

3. Mrs. Anne Hodges (d.1663), widow of Augustine Hodges

4. Mrs. Margaret Tucker (d.1664), widow of Daniel Tucker

5. Mrs. Mary Ballard (d. bef. 28 May 1673), widow of Thomas Bromfield. She survived Joseph Croshaw, and married 3rd, after April 1667, Clement Marsh

== Death ==
Joseph Croshaw died on April 10, 1667, the same day his will was written and recorded in York County, Virginia. The inventory of his estate was substantial and included numerous household objects made of both pewter and silver. One large silver tankard was valued at four pounds sterling (equivalent to about £330 in 2017). The inventory of 1668 also listed the Croshaw estate as having 1000 bricks manufactured either by their own servants or by transient laborers.

== Sources ==
- "Crowshaw", by Martha Woodroof Hiden; William and Mary Qtrly (2), XXI, pp265 70.
- The Generall Historie of Virginia, New-England, and the Summer Isles, by John Smith, 1624, Vol III, pp 78 81, Vol IV, pp. 151 154.
- "The Complete Works of Captain John Smith", edited by Philip L. Barbour; Vol II, University of North Carolina Press, Chapel Hill, NC, 1986.
