= Orlando Jones (politician) =

Virginian politician (1681–1719)

Member of the House of Burgesses from King William County
- In office 1714
- In office 1715
- In office 1718

Personal details
- Born: 31 December 1681 (O.S.) Colony of Virginia
- Died: 12 June 1719 (aged 37) Queen's Creek, Colony of Virginia
- Resting place: Bruton Parish; Williamsburg, Virginia, U.S.
- Spouses: Martha Macon (1703 – 1716); Mary Elizabeth Williams (1716 – 1719)
- Relations: Martha Washington (granddaughter); Gideon Macon (father-in-law)

Orlando Jones (31 December 1681 – 12 June 1719 O.S.) was a planter and politician who served in the House of Burgesses of the Colony of Virginia. He was the son of Rowland Jones, the first minister of Bruton Parish. Jones was educated at the College of William & Mary's grammar school in Middle Plantation. There, he likely played a role in the 1699 May Day orations that led to the colonial capital being moved from Jamestown to Middle Plantation, which became Williamsburg. He represented King William County in the House of Burgesses in 1714, 1715, and 1718. He was the maternal grandfather of Martha Washington. His house in Williamsburg was reconstructed in the 1940s by Colonial Williamsburg.

== Biography ==
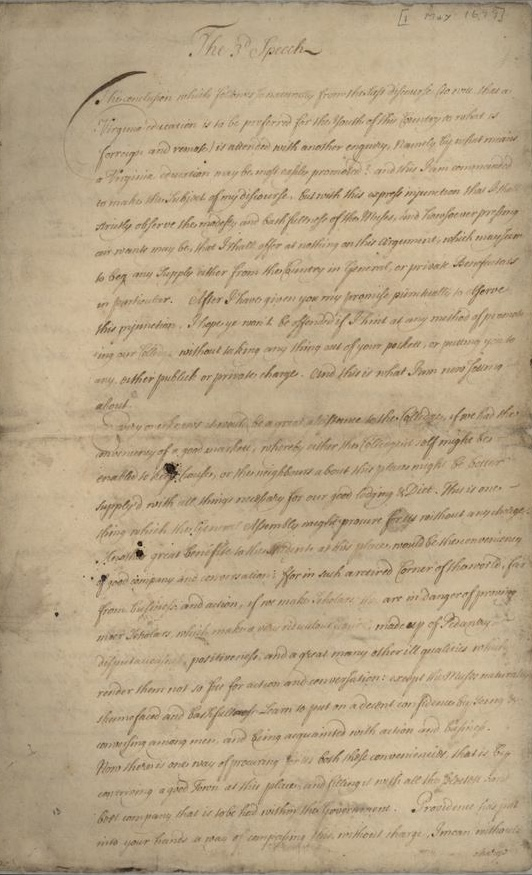
The first page of a transcript of the speech likely given by Orlando Jones on 1 May 1699

Orlando Jones was born to Rowland and Anne (probably née Lane) Jones on 31 December 1681 (O.S.) in the Colony of Virginia. Rowland Jones had been born in 1644 in Swinbrook and educated at Merton College, Oxford, before moving to Virginia and became the first minister of Bruton Parish, a Church of England parish church in Middle Plantation. Anne Jones was her husband's second wife. On Rowland Jones's 1688 death, he willed that some of his land – totaling 400 acres (160 ha) – and property would be given as a life-right to Anne, which would pass to Orlando on her death.

Jones was educated at the grammar school of the College of William & Mary in Middle Plantation. The college had been recently established when Jones began his attendance. In 1698, the statehouse at the colonial capital of Jamestown burned. Francis Nicholson, the governor of Virginia, and James Blair, the college's president, conceived a plan to convince the Virginia General Assembly to move the capital to Middle Plantation. The subsequent 1699 May Day orations, performed in front of leading Virginians at the College Building in Middle Plantation, featured five student speeches ("Scholastick Exercises") that discussed the importance of the college and proposed moving the capital. Jones is believe to have delivered the third oration, which directly proposed Middle Plantation as a suitable candidate for becoming the colony's new capital. The third oration was again read before the General Assembly on 18 May 1699. Later that day, the House of Burgesses – the General Assembly's lower house – voted in favor of moving the capital to Middle Plantation, which was renamed to Williamsburg.

By 1702, Nicholson and Blair had become political rivals. Following a barring out – a ritual in which students lock a school to faculty in order secure an earlier beginning to the Christmas vacation – by the students of the grammar school in early December 1702, Blair claimed that Nicholson had instructed the students to use a loaded firearm and to kill Blair. As part of the investigation that followed, Jones gave an affidavit in May 1705 that said barring out the faculty had been an annual event at the grammar school (except for in 1700) and that these events had never been performed with the intention of doing harm. Jones was not in Virginia during the 1702 barring out, having travelled to England earlier that year. In his statement, Jones also indicated that he had been an usher at the grammar school, a position he held from 1700 until his 1702 resignation before his trip to England. Following the barring out allegations, Blair succeeded in ousting Nicholson from the governorship in 1705.

On 31 January 1703, Jones married Martha Macon, the daughter of the burgess Gideon Macon. Their first surviving child was born in 1707 in the territory of St. Peter's Parish in New Kent County and was named Lane (also spelled "Lain") Jones. It is partially through this son's name that Orlando Jones's mother's maiden name is inferred as "Lane". They also had a daughter, Frances, who was born in 1710. Through Frances and her husband, the politician John Dandridge, Orlando Jones became the maternal grandfather of Martha Washington, the wife of George Washington.

Jones owned land in both King William County and Williamsburg. He also held land and lived in an area known later as Timson's Neck (later Travis's Neck) along the York River in York County. The Jones family enjoyed the growing wealth of the planter class in the early 18th-century, living in a superior house to those of both Rowland Jones and Gideon Macon. Their brick house of five or six rooms was near to both Queen's Creek – which permitted access to the York River – and to the urban amenities of Williamsburg. They also owned a rental tenement house on Duke of Gloucester Street in Williamsburg. Though he was not a major planter, Jones owned 21 enslaved persons. A house, in ruins by 1939, on the road between Barhamsville and Slaterville in New Kent County has been traditionally described as having belonged to the Jones family.

In 1714 and 1715, Jones was elected as a burgess representing King William County. In 1716, Martha Jones died. In keeping with the conventions of the period, Orlando Jones soon remarried later that year. His second wife was Mary Elizabeth Williams from King and Queen County, with whom he had no children. Jones was elected as a burgess from King William County again in 1718. Shortly before his death, Jones may have moved to James City County. Jones produced a will on 4 June 1719, which was put on record in Yorktown. He died at his Queen's Creek property on 12 June 1719 and was buried inside Bruton Parish. Martha Jones had been initially buried in New Kent County but the body was reinterred next to her husband under a tombstone in the chancel erected by his second wife.

His will had instructed Mary Jones to sell the rental property in Williamsburg and live on his plantation. She sold the rental property to John James Flournoy, a Huguenot watchmaker, in 1719. She then married Flournoy and moved her children with her to Williamsburg. To his daughter Frances, Jones left property that included ten enslaved persons. Though the Williamsburg house was destroyed – probably soon after Orlando Jones's death – by fire or to accommodate a change to the street's grading, it was reconstructed in the 1940s by Colonial Williamsburg.
