= John Dandridge (delegate) =

American lawyer and politician (1762–1799)

Member of the Virginia House of Delegates from New Kent County
- Preceded by: John Clopton
- Succeeded by: Robert B. Armistead
- Preceded by: William H. Macon
- Succeeded by: John Clopton

Personal details
- Born: 1762 New Kent County, Virginia
- Died: 1799 (aged 36–37) New Kent County, Virginia
- Spouse: Rebecca Minge
- Relations: Martha Dandridge Washington (aunt)
- Children: Lucy
- Parent(s): Bartholomew Dandridge, Mary Burbridge
- Occupation: lawyer, planter, politician

John Dandridge (born 1758 or 1762–1799) was a Virginia lawyer, planter and politician in New Kent County, Virginia, which he represented in the Virginia House of Delegates for four terms.

== Early and family life ==
Coat of Arms of William Dandridge II

He was the first son born to the former Mary Burbridge, the second wife of prominent lawyer, politician and planter Bartholomew Dandridge. His name honors his paternal grandfather, John Dandridge, also a prominent planter and politician in the area (serving as New Kent County's Clerk for 26 years), who had died two years earlier. His uncle William Dandridge and his family inherited the main "Chestnut Grove" plantation. His maternal grandfather Julius King Burbridge had acquired the nearby "Pamocra" plantation where this man lived most of his life (as did his paternal grandmother Frances Jones Dandridge from Chestnut Grove's sale in 1768 until her death in 1785), before moving to nearly Prince George County a few years before his death. As an adult this John Dandridge remembered spending considerable time at the nearby "Eltham" estate, the home of his aunt Anna Marie Dandridge Bassett (who died in 1777) and her husband, Burwell Bassett Sr. Eltham was one of several plantations inherited by John Bassett, who briefly served in the Virginia House of Delegates a decade before this man. His sister Judith Bassett married Peter Lyons, who became a member of the Virginia Supreme Court. Complicating matters, this John Dandridge also had two distant cousins of the same name: one born 1756 (one of the four sons of Capt. Nathaniel West Dandridge who served in the House of Burgesses from Hanover County) and one the son of Francis Dandridge and who with his brother William Dandridge III inherited and sold the Huntington estate in New Kent County.

This John Dandridge had three younger brothers, none of whom married. The most notable of them may have been Bartholomew Dandridge Jr. who became the personal secretary to President George Washington (whose wife, the former Martha Dandridge Custis, was their aunt) and then began a diplomatic career, dying as the American consul in Haiti in 1802. His brother William Dandridge worked many years as the cashier of the Bank of the United States in Richmond. Junius Burbridge Dandridge also died unmarried. Their three sisters all married. Martha Washington Dandridge to Scotland-born Dr. William Halyburton, Mary Dandridge to Mr. Willison, and Frances Dandridge to George Minge, brother of this man's wife. The family also included two elder half-sisters.

A member of the First Families of Virginia, this John Dandridge received an education appropriate to his class, then read law with his father's encouragement.

He married Rebecca Jones Minge, daughter of David Minge of Charles City County. Their daughter Lucy would marry James Walker Murdaugh of Williamsburg, who would serve in the House of Delegates representing Norfolk a decade after this man's death.

== Career ==
Dandridge began a legal career in New Kent County and adjacent Tidewater counties, including Charles City County. After his father's death in 1785, he inherited considerable property, including at least 33 enslaved adults and 31 younger enslaved people, 5 horses and 40 cattle, as well as assumed responsibility for his younger siblings.

New Kent County voters elected John Dandridge as one of their delegates (part-time) to the Virginia House of Delegates in 1788, though unlike his cousin (and future multi-term Congressman) Burwell Basset Jr., he was not re-elected the following year. Dandridge again won election to represent New Kent County in the House of Delegates in 1792, and with his co-delegate John Chamberlayne won re-election twice.

One of the delicate cases Dandridge handled as a Virginia lawyer involved the estate of William Armistead, who had died in 1793, and had previously served as one of New Kent County's delegates. During the Revolutionary War, Armistead had acted for several years as commissary, helping to provision Virginia's troops, for which service he had been promised 35,000 lbs of tobacco. However, he had not been paid, because a fire had destroyed his books and records for 1780 and 1781, so he was unable to submit the necessary accounting. They had been at the New Kent County clerk's office, which burned down along with the nearby jail in 1783 during an escape attempt of John Price Posey, who had been steward of the White House plantation for the underage George Washington Parke Custis, and had been arrested and jailed there for stealing from the estate (rearrested and convicted on the testimony of his accomplice, Posey hanged in 1788). Dandridge submitted a petition to the Virginia General Assembly seeking compensation for his client, which succeeded in 1801 (after his death).

== Death and legacy ==
Dandridge sold Pamocra to Lydall Apperson in 1797 and moved to Prince George County. This John Dandridge died in 1799. The special collections division of the College of William and Mary's Swem library holds his papers.
