= 1699 May Day orations =

Series of speeches in Virginia

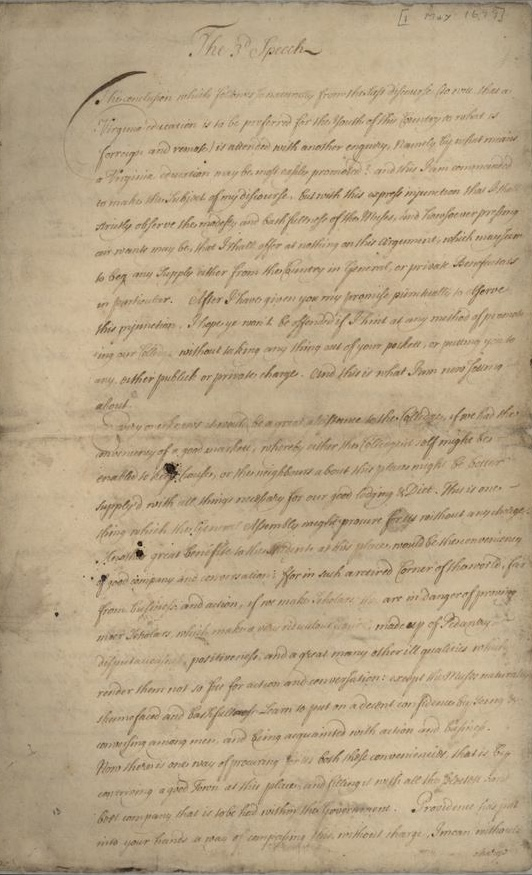
The first page of a transcript of the third oration

A series of five speeches were given by five students of the College of William & Mary's grammar school on May Day (1 May O.S.) 1699 as part of "Scholastick Exercises" before an audience of local political leaders with the purpose of convincing members of the Colony of Virginia's General Assembly to move the colony's capital from Jamestown to Middle Plantation and support the college. Organized by Virginia's governor Francis Nicholson and the college's president James Blair, the orations followed the burning of the statehouse in Jamestown in 1698. The speeches were well received by the representatives of the House of Burgesses, leading to the establishment of Williamsburg at Middle Plantation and the moving of the colony capital to the new city.

Nicholson, who had briefly served as Virginia's lieutenant governor before being replaced by Edmund Andros, had returned as Virginia's governor in 1698 after serving as the governor of Maryland. While in Maryland, Nicholson succeeding in moving that colony's capital to Annapolis. The College of William & Mary was chartered in 1693. Established in Middle Plantation under Blair, the college and its president had been opposed by Andros before his removal as governor. Upon Nicholson's return to Virginia, he allied with Blair in supporting moving the capital to Middle Plantation, where wealth and influence had gradually shifted over the preceding decades.

The five speeches were given at the Main Building (now the Wren Building) of the college in front of government officials, the college's trustees, and others. The May Day exercises were a well-organized event. The first speech discussed the importance of education and the second speech praised the presence of a school in Virginia. The third speech directly openly addressed the benefits of moving the capital of the colony to Middle Plantation. The fourth speech thanked the supporters of the college and the fifth speech encouraged the colonial government to support the college and promote its success.

The speeches succeeded in spurring the capital to be moved, establishing the city of Williamsburg, and developing the community around the college. The original manuscripts of the speeches have been held by the Society for the Propagation of the Gospel in London. In 1999, a recreation of the event was held at William & Mary to commemorate the 300th anniversary of Williamsburg's establishment.

== Background ==
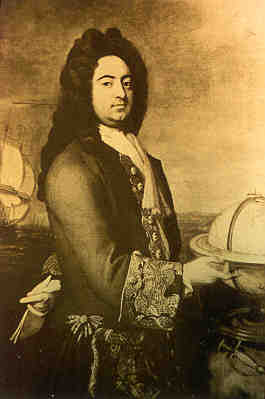
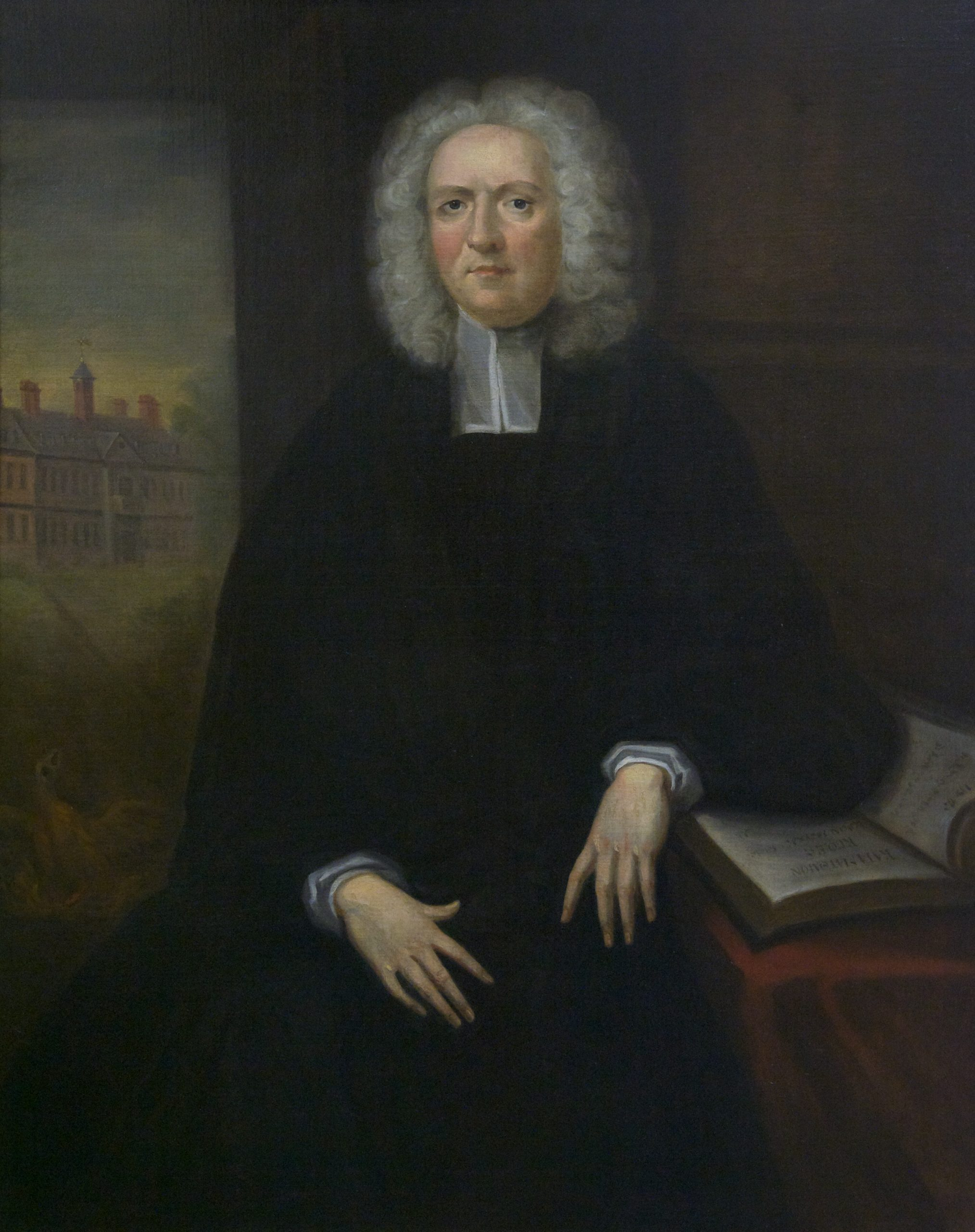
Virginia's governor Francis Nicholson (possible portrait left) and the College of William & Mary's president James Blair (right) advocated for moving the colony's capital from Jamestown to Middle Plantation.

Jamestown had served as the capital of the Colony of Virginia since 1607, when both were established by English settlers. Jamestown was located along the James River on a marshy site that the local Native Americans had considered not hospitable but was evaluated by the English as possessing good access to the water and reasonable defenses against a potential Spanish attack. In Jamestown was the statehouse, where the General Assembly of the Governor's Council and House of Burgesses met since their establishment in 1619.

Another community of English settlers began nearby at Middle Plantation. This community, named for its location in the middle of the Virginia Peninsula between the James and York Rivers, was established after the General Assembly funded the construction of a palisade on the site in 1632, which was completed in 1634. The planter John Page moved to Middle Plantation in 1662, initiating the shift of wealth towards the new community. The same year, the Crown revoked Jamestown's status as the only legal port of entry to Virginia, reducing the economic and political power of the capital.

Interest in moving Virginia's capital from Jamestown was galvanized in 1676. On the night 19 September, members of Bacon's Rebellion burned most of Jamestown, including its statehouse. Many prominent and wealthy Virginians were already resident in Middle Plantation, and several members of the government lobbied for that community to become the colony's new capital. In 1677, Middle Plantation functioned as a temporary capital while Jamestown was being rebuilt. Proposals to make the move permanent were rejected by Charles II due to a desire to keep the capital on the James River, and the statehouse was rebuilt. A 1680 vote in the General Assembly narrowly favored Jamestown over another proposed new capital, Tyndale's Point (now Gloucester Point). Until the statehouse was rebuilt several years later, the government met in taverns and houses.

Francis Nicholson served a brief stint as Virginia's lieutenant governor from 1690 to 1692, during which time he had collaborated with the Scottish Church of England clergyman and influential Virginian James Blair in lobbying for the establishment of a college in the colony. Blair convinced King William III and Queen Mary II to charter the College of William & Mary for the colony in 1693. The General Assembly selected Middle Plantation at the site for this new school, which proved an important step in moving the capital there.

Nicholson left Virginia following his appointment as the governor of Maryland, a position he held between 1694 and 1698. In that office, he moved Maryland's capital from Saint Mary's City to Annapolis. Nicholson had an interest in city planning and education that had seen him assist in laying out Annapolis and establishing King William's School (now St. John's College) there. Replacing him as governor in Virginia was Edmund Andros. Blair was the colony's ecclesiastical commissary had become part of the Governor's Council in 1694. While Andros had initially been a proponent of the College of William & Mary, Blair's temperament and political influence made Andros an opponent of both the school and its president. Despite this, in 1695, construction began on the college's Main Building (now the Wren Building) in Middle Plantation and the college's grammar school began operation in a nearby schoolhouse.

Blair exerted his influence to force Andros's resignation in May 1698, claiming Andros's physical weakness following a fall from a horse put the colony at risk of another rebellion. Nicholson was appointed as Virginia's governor and returned to the colony in December that year. Before Nicholson's arrival, on 21 October 1698, the rebuilt Jamestown statehouse burned. The historian J. E. Morpurgo said the fire "was an accident but if Blair and Nicholson has come themselves with tar, torches, and bellows they could not have wrought better for themselves, for their policies, and for the college, than did the wind which fanned the flames on 21 October 1698". When the General Assembly crammed into two houses to begin its session on 27 April 1699, Nicholson's opening address called upon the gathered representatives to again consider moving the capital. Capitalizing on the fire, Nicholson and Blair arranged for members of the Governor's Council, House of Burgesses, and college trustees to attend "Scholastick Exercises" – speeches performed by students – to celebrate a "public day of rejoicing" for the May Day holiday on 1 May 1699 (O.S.).

== Speeches ==
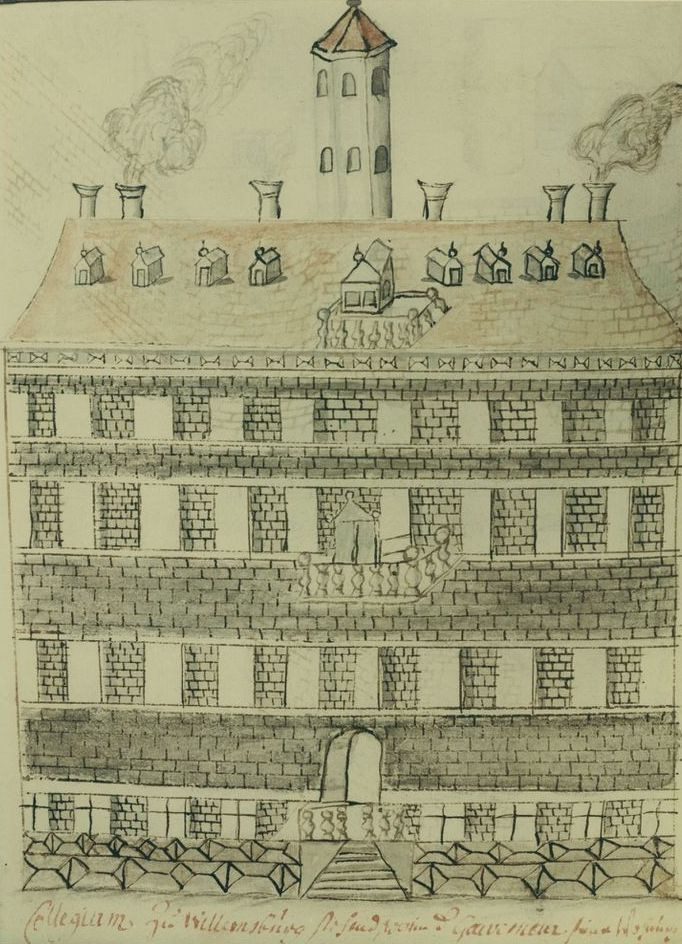
The college's Main Building as it appeared in 1702. The speeches took place at the recently constructed building.

The five speeches given by students of the College of William & Mary's grammar school were part of a well-staged event arranged by Nicholson and Blair. Such orations were normal features in English schools of the era, with younger students typically responsible for speaking. The five speeches given by the grammar school master Mungo Inglis's students were written to convince the General Assembly to support the college, demonstrate its early success, and advocate for moving the capital to Middle Plantation and thus closer to the college. They also addressed potential opposition to relocating the capital to Middle Plantation from both Jamestown landowners and those from other sites in the colony. While no records survive regarding its state in 1698, the Main Building of the college was sufficiently complete by 1699 to host the event.

Contrary to the norm for such orations, the speeches given during the event were given in English, rather than in Latin, Greek, or Hebrew. This was possibly done to ensure that the listeners better comprehended the message that the speeches were intended to convey. However, the speeches were conventional in eschewing brevity. The five students assigned with delivering the speeches did so effectively, with each speaker responsible for a speech on different aspects of Nicholson and Blair's message. Each speech reflected 17th-century oratory tastes in the presence of classical allusions, but also contain colloquialisms that suggest that they may have been written by the teenage boys who read them. The historian Katherine Egner Gruber assessed the speeches as having been written by Nicholson and Blair. The historian Parke Rouse believed that the students had been coached by Blair and Inglis, pointing to the remarks in the speeches where the students said that they had been "commanded" and "directed" on what subjects to discuss. Morpurgo said that that "subject-matter is so shrewdly loaded" and the sequence of speeches "so logically developed, so complete, and so unanswerable" that the transcripts of the speeches were likely collaborations with "the subtle hands of Nicholson and Blair".

The first speech praised learning as a virtue that fostered both knowledge and good behavior. Playing to the values of the audience, this speaker also condemned ignorance as a vice while suggesting that learned men were more attractive to women. This speech contained several classical allusions, saying that learning allowed students to "converse with the most excellent men of all ages": Plato, Aristotle, Seneca, and Cicero. The second speech took the universal goods of education discussed in the first speech and narrowed them to promote the benefits of Virginian students learning in Virginia. The student favorably compared receiving an education from the new college "to our childrens procureing of it abroad in England or other forreigne parts". A Virginia education, the speaker held, did not put students from the colony at a disadvantage among their peers and did not come with the expense of sending a child to an English school.

The third speech was the only of the five to directly address the issue of moving the capital from Jamestown to Middle Plantation. It was also the one that, according to the historian Marcus Whiffen, most likely drew inspiration from Nicholson. This speech was probably given by the grammar school student Orlando Jones, the son of the first rector at Middle Plantation's Bruton Parish and a grandfather of Martha Washington. Almost three thousand words, the third speech probably took about half an hour to complete. The speaker listed seven reasons why Middle Plantation was the right site for a capital city independent of the college's presence. He first described Middle Plantation's sanitary qualities and solid and elevated ground, as opposed to somewhere with "moskitoes and the noisom stinks thick fogs of fenny, marshy, and swampy grounds". The speaker also noted that Middle Plantation was connected by Queen's Creek and Archer's Hope Creek (now College Creek), respectively, to the York and James Rivers, alongside other benefits to local business and security against Native American attacks. The third speaker also emphasized that establishing a capital city near the college would be beneficial to both institutions.

Morpurgo described the fourth and fifth speeches as an "anticlimactic" turn from persuasion to flattery. The fourth speech thanked unnamed benefactors of the college, which included many members of the General Assembly in the audience, and thanked John Page by name. Page had been dead for seven years by the time of the May Day exercises, but the fourth speaker credited him with being the first to promote Middle Plantation as the site for the colony's college. The same speaker also dealt criticism towards Andros and the remaining opponents to the college, saying that during the Andros administration "it recommended a man of the then governours favour to be a notorious enemy of the colledge". The fifth and final speaker was a plea for lawmakers to continue supporting the college, expressing hope for its future:

That the nations of America takeing example from us, may be excited to the study and exercise of learning and virtue, and may confess and acknowledge that the Colledge of William and Mary in Virginia is the mansion house of virtue, the Parnassus of the Muses, and a seminary of excellent men. [...] Methinks we see alreddy that happy time when we shall surpass the Asiaticans in civility, the Jews in religion, the Greeks in philosophy, the Egyptians in geometry, the Phenicians in arithmetick, and the Caldeans in astrology. O happy Virginia!

The speeches had also briefly touched on the issue of slavery. The second speaker had suggested that white Virginian boys traveling across the Atlantic Ocean to receive an education were at risk of capture and enslavement. The historian Terry L. Meyers considered this speaker "oblivious" to the character of slavery in the colony, with the student opposing traveling for an education on the additional basis that "that to carry them out of these into remote and forreigne parts is like the turning of creatures out of their owne element". The third speaker had acknowledged the presence of personal slaves at the college and identified their roles as "the kitchin, buttery, gardens, [and] wooding".

== Results and legacy ==
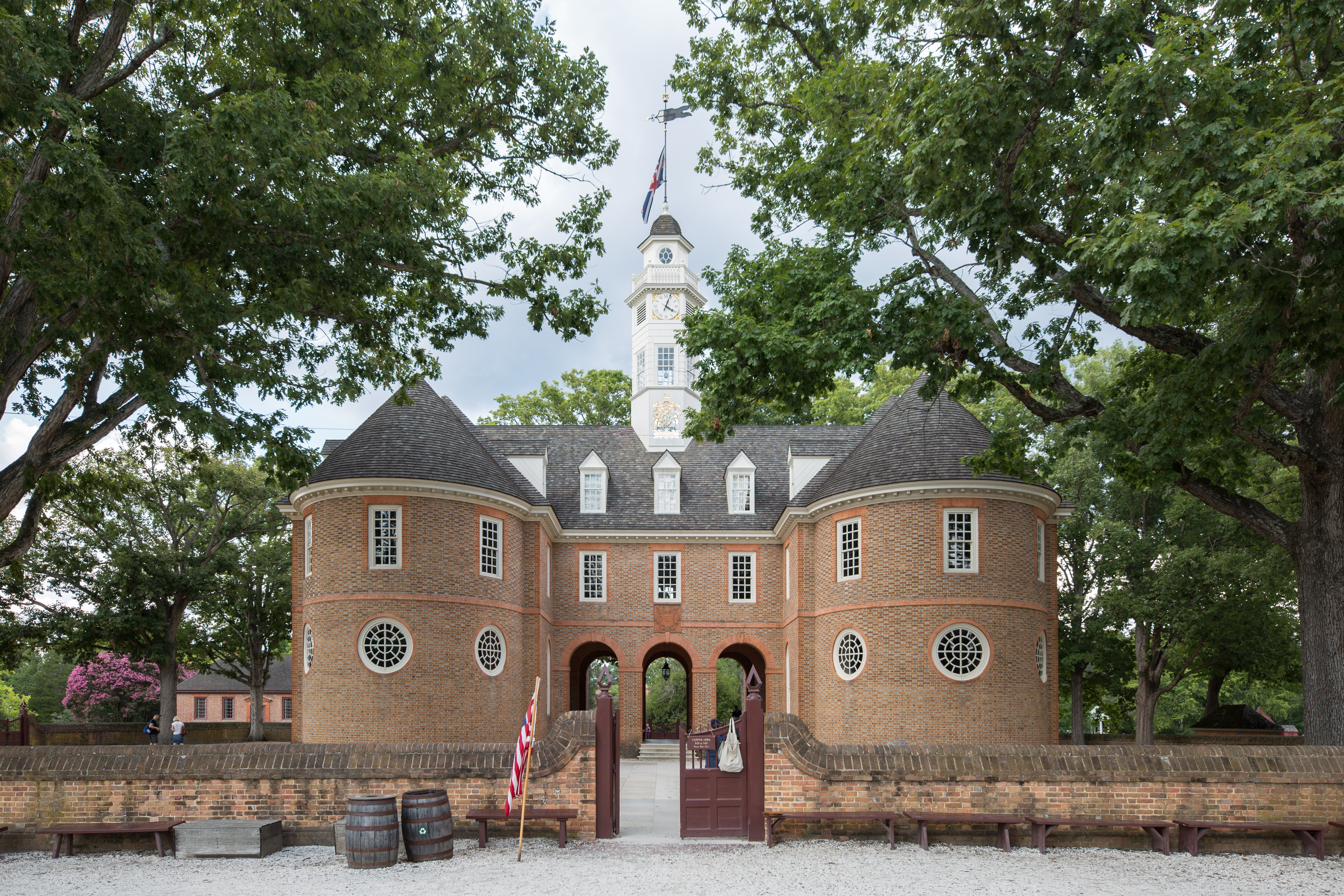
The Capitol was completed in Williamsburg in 1705. A reconstruction by Colonial Williamsburg (pictured) now stands on the site.

Following the May Day exercises, on 18 May, the General Assembly convened in Jamestown. Before the burgesses, Nicholson, Blair, Inglis, the grammar school's usher, and four students spoke again in favor of moving the capital to Middle Plantation. Nicholson encouraged the burgesses to support "the placing of your public building [...] somewhere at Middle Plantation nigh his Majesty's Royall College of William and Mary". The third oration, which had discussed that issue, was read into the record of the House of Burgesses. Later that day, the burgesses supported a resolution that called for the next statehouse to be built at Middle Plantation.

Nicholson and Blair's May Day scheme was successful in moving the capital. On 7 June 1699, the General Assembly passed An Act directing the Building of the Capitoll and the City of Williamsburgh, making Middle Plantation Virginia's new capital city and renaming it for King William III. Nicholson had commissioned a survey of the Middle Plantation area around the same time as the May Day exercises, and it details were incorporated into the act. The act indicated that the new city of Williamsburg would be anchored on the college, from which a Baroque city plan by Nicholson called for a nearly one-mile-long main street – later named Duke of Gloucester Street – would extend east from the Main Building past Bruton Parish to the new Capitol (completed in 1705). The description of the new government building as a "Capitoll" was a classical term – contrasting with the more conventional statehouse – and designation of Williamsburg as a city indicated Nicholson's ambitions for his plan. The concerns regarding waterborne access from the two navigable creeks into area had been acknowledged by in the May Day speeches. These were addressed by the new city plan, which formally established Queen Mary's Port on Queen's Creek and Princess Anne's Port (now College Landing) on Archer's Hope Creek and connected them to the city by road.

The May Day exercises were also successful in securing direct support for the College of William & Mary and dismissing its remaining opposition. Blair submitted a report to Archbishop of Canterbury Thomas Tenison ten months after the orations which announced financial support in the form of subscriptions were coming in quickly. Nicholson contributed £500 of his own money to the college and announced that his books would be given to the college's library upon his death. Although a London newspaper report in March 1700 exaggerated the college's success in suggesting it had evolved beyond being only a grammar school of 30 boys and into a university overcrowded with students, the college fortunes were on an upswing. Even the college's opponent Andros contributed £56.7.6 towards "sashing the college", as recorded in October 1700. Blair and Nicholson would ultimately become rivals and, making accusations that Nicholson had instigated an allegedly violent barring out ceremony, Blair forced the governor out just as he had done with Andros and would later do with lieutenant governor Alexander Spotswood.

The speeches had suggested that moving the capital to Middle Plantation would create a mutually beneficial town and gown relationship. This proved to be the case philosophically, with the establishment of Williamsburg introducing contemporary Enlightenment values to the colony. The social benefits to the students' educations arising from such a move had also been promoted by the speeches, with the students' interactions with the colony's leaders serving as a conduit of Enlightenment values between the generations. Both Nicholson and Spotswood would encourage these interactions while serving in office.

Beyond their political implications, the May Day orations had been entertaining and were well remembered. The college's first commencement, held in the new capital in 1700, drew many visitors. Some travelled by land and sea from New York, Pennsylvania, and Maryland "to hear the graduates perform their Academical Exercises"; also in attendance were Native Americans who were interested in the event. To commemorate the 300th anniversary of its establishment, the city of Williamsburg held a series of events on May Day 1999. Among the ceremonies was a recreation of the 1699 May Day orations by five College of William & Mary students in front of the Wren Building.

As of 1960, the original manuscript copies of the speeches were held in the archives of the Society for the Propagation of the Gospel in London. The U.S. Library of Congress made photographic copies of the manuscripts with funding from John D. Rockefeller Jr., from which the speeches were copied and printed in the October 1930 issue of The William and Mary College Quarterly Historical Magazine. There, the speeches and other early documents on the College of William & Mary published earlier that year by the same journal were described as "a notable accession to our knowledge of the early history of William and Mary College, and to the history of education in the American Colonies". It is from these speeches that Page's involvement in establishing the college at Middle Plantation is known.
