= Susanna Passavant =

English businessperson (1711–1790)

- Born: 1711
- Died: 1790 (aged 78–79)
- Occupation: Businessperson

Susanna Passavant (1711–1790), was an English businessperson. She was an internationally influential luxury goods retailer.

She belonged to a Huguenot family of jewelers. She apprenticed with the Worshipful Company of Spectacle Makers under the Master George Willdey, earning her Freedom by Servitude on January 8, 1735. She was established in the City of London. She became a manager at first George Willdey and then Thomas Willdey’s toy shops on Ludgate Street.

In the early 1750s, Passavant opened her own retail shop, The Plume of Feathers, on Ludgate Hill. She sold a wide range of goods, including accessories, jewelry and toys. The Plume of Feathers was involved in the sale of luxury goods both domestically and internationally. Through her association with the London merchant house Robert Cary & Company, she exported the sale of jewelry to American customers, including George Washington and Martha Washington.

Many of her products are preserved, such as the Jewels of Martha Washington from Mount Vernon.
