= Bartholomew Dandridge =

American 18th century politician (1737–1785)

Member of the Virginia Supreme Court
- In office March 29, 1780 – April 18, 1785
- Preceded by: position established

Member of the Virginia House of Delegates for New Kent County
- In office May 4, 1778 – March 29, 1779 Serving with Richmond Allen
- Preceded by: Lewis Webb
- Succeeded by: Armistead Bassett

Member of the House of Burgesses for New Kent County
- In office 1772–1776 Serving with Burwell Bassett
- Preceded by: William Clayton
- Succeeded by: position abolished

Personal details
- Born: December 25, 1737 Chestnut Grove, New Kent County, Virginia colony
- Died: April 18, 1785 (aged 47) Pamocra plantation, New Kent County, Virginia, United States
- Spouse: Mary Burbidge
- Children: John Dandridge, William Dandridge
- Relatives: Martha Dandridge Washington (sister)
- Occupation: Planter; attorney; politician; judge

Bartholomew Dandridge (25 December 1737 – 18 April 1785) was an early American planter, lawyer and patriot. He represented New Kent County in the House of Burgesses, all five Virginia Revolutionary Conventions, and once in the Virginia House of Delegates before fellow legislators selected him as a judge of what later became known as the Virginia Supreme Court.

== Early life ==
Coat of Arms of William Dandridge II

Dandridge was born on Christmas, 1737 at Chestnut Grove in New Kent County in the Colony of Virginia. He was the fourth child of Col. John Dandridge and his wife Frances Jones Dandridge. His paternal grandfather John Dandridge Sr. was from Oxfordshire but became a member of the London company of painters. His son (this man's uncle) William Dandridge was an officer in the Royal Navy who emigrated to Virginia and became a merchant and planter by 1715, owning Elsing Green plantation in King William County after his marriage, as well as a wharf in Hampton and a merchant ship. Capt. Dandridge became a friend of Virginia governor Alexander Spottswood, who appointed him to the Governor's Council and also commissioned him to survey the boundary between Virginia and North Carolina; one son and one daughter of each family married into the other. His maternal great-grandfather, Rowland Jones, was the first rector of now historic Bruton Parish Church in Williamsburg, the colony's capital for most of this man's life. His maternal grandfather, Orlando Jones represented King William County for several terms in the House of Burgesses.

Meanwhile, this man's father, John Dandridge followed his brother to the Virginia colony and became clerk of New Kent County in 1730, which position he held until his death in 1756. John Dandridge also served as an officer in the local militia and operated a plantation called Chestnut Grove about four miles away, using enslaved labor. Bartholomew had elder brothers John Dandridge (1737-1749) and William Dandridge (1734-1776), but probably his most important sibling was his eldest sister, Martha, who later became the first First Lady of the United States. Bartholomew received a private education suitable to his class. His father died in Fredericksburg in August 1756 while visiting his niece and her husband, Col. John Spottswood, when Bartholomew was 19 years old, just under legal age.

== Marriage and personal life ==
Dandridge married twice. Although the name of his first wife is lost, their daughter Anne married William Dandridge Claiborne, and their daughter Elizabeth married William Langhorne. Bartholomew Dandridge's second wife was Mary Burbidge, the daughter of Julius King Burbidge, who had in 1744 purchased from Mann Page's estate the 3,407-acre Pamocra estate which by 1768 was within the redrawn New Kent County. In 1782, Bartholomew Dandridge paid taxes on the land, where his lived with his wife and family, which included Burbidge widow, who may have held a life estate.

Mary and Bartholomew Dandridges had seven children, of whom four were sons (John, Bartholomew, William and Julius) and three daughters (Martha, Mary and Frances). Their eldest daughter Martha married Dr. William Halyburton of Scotland, and their son was Judge James Dandridge Halyburton. Their daughter Mary married John Willison, and Frances married George W.H. Minge. John (1758-1799) became a lawyer and would also serve as in the Virginia House of Delegates; he might have died at Pamocra, but also practiced law in Charles City County, where his wife Rebecca Jones Minge, came from, and their daughter Lucy married J.W. Murdaugh of Williamsburg. Their son, also named John, was living at Pamocra in 1813, but planned to travel elsewhere. Complicating matters, this generation of Dandridges also included two men named Bartholomew. Judge Bartholomew Dandridge's son, Bartholomew Dandridge Jr. never married, but became the private secretary of his uncle President George Washington, then a diplomat, dying as consul in war-torn Haiti in 1802. Complicating matters, his cousin Bartholomew Dandridge (1760-1803), son of his uncle William Dandridge, married Elizabeth Clayton (daughter of Col. William Clayton who served as a legislator with his father), and after her death married the only daughter of Major William Armistead of New Kent County, Susan Baker Armistead, who bore a son Bartholomew Dandridge (d. 1829) who eventually became the Clerk of New Kent County, after being partly raised by his stepfather David Dorrington. That Bartholomew Dandridge may have lived with 9 Blacks in 1810, and lived with four free Colored people in 1820.

== Career ==
Bartholomew Dandridge studied law and quickly made an outstanding reputation, as well as operated his mother-in-law's and wife's estate using enslaved labor. New Kent County voters elected him as one of their representatives to the House of Burgesses in 1772 and re-elected him two years later. However, dissatisfaction with British policy was growing, and when Virginia's royal governor, Lord Dunmore, suppressed the legislature in 1775, Dandridge and fellow planter Burwell Bassett (with whom he had served in the House of Burgesses) were elected as the county's representatives to the first four Virginia Revolutionary Conventions; Dandridge served on the fifth Revolutionary Convention alongside Col. William Clayton, whom he had succeeded in 1772. His political influence was such that on August 17, 1775 Dandridge came within one vote of being elected to the statewide Committee of Safety that governed the Commonwealth for the next ten months, and the next session elected him to the Committee of Privileges and Elections. Dandridge helped to draft both the resolution dissolving the relationship with Great Britain and the Virginia Declaration of Rights. On June 29, 1776 he was elected to the Council of State, which held administrative powers as well as advised Governor Patrick Henry, but Dandridge resigned that position to attend family business on January 8, 1778. Although Dandridge did not serve in the first session of the Virginia House of Delegates, he won election as one of New Kent County's delegates in 1778. Meanwhile, a planter cousin, William Dandridge, son of his late uncle Capt. William Dandridge, represented Hanover County for several terms.

On May 29, 1778, fellow legislators elected Bartholomew Dandridge to the General Court, and the following year created a new Court of Appeals, which consisted of the judges of the General Court, Court of Admiralty and the High Court of Chancery. Thus, Dandridge became a judge on what in modern times is the Supreme Court of Virginia. The Court of Appeals first met in the spring of 1779, although Dandridge first took his seat on March 29, 1780. He participated in Commonwealth v. Caton wherein some judges enunciated the principle of judicial review, but Judge Dandridge declined to express an opinion on that issue. Judge Dandridge remained on the Court until his death in 1785.

== Death and legacy ==
Dandridge and his mother died within several days of one another in April 1785. His sister, Martha Washington received notice of both deaths in the same dispatch. Dandridge's will left his Rockhock plantation to his wife Mary, and his eldest son John received land in Doctor's Swamp as well as a Mill and Grist Mill on Diascund Creek. His sons Julius, Bartholomew and William received lands in North Carolina purchased from Patrick Henry. Judge Dandridge also provided for his mother and mother-in-law in his will. Judge Dandridge also manumitted two slaves, gave his daughter Anna Claiborne one negro and another to his granddaughter Elizabeth Dandride Claiborne, and divided the rest of his slaves among his children by his wife Mary, who had a life estate in them. The problem was that the judge's slaves were mortgaged because Dandridge was financially embarrassed following the American Revolutionary War. Therefore, his brother-in-law, General (later President) George Washington took 33 slaves as payment for a loan he had made from Martha Dandridge Washington's property in 1765, and lent them back (without charge) to Dandridge's widow Mary so she could support their children on what had been a family plantation. The late President specifically mentioned freeing the Dandridge slaves in his will, but delayed such until the widow's death.

John Dandridge would follow in his father's career path, including representing New Kent County in the Virginia House of Delegates beginning in 1788. His brother Julius Burbridge Dandridge (1770-1828) became a banker in Richmond, which had become the state capital, first clerking at the Bank of Virginia, then became the cashier at the Richmond Branch of the Second Bank of the United States, but was accused of misfeasance, and a lawsuit against his sureties reached the Supreme Court of the United States before being settled after his accidental death.
