= George Willdey =

British engraver and optical instrument maker

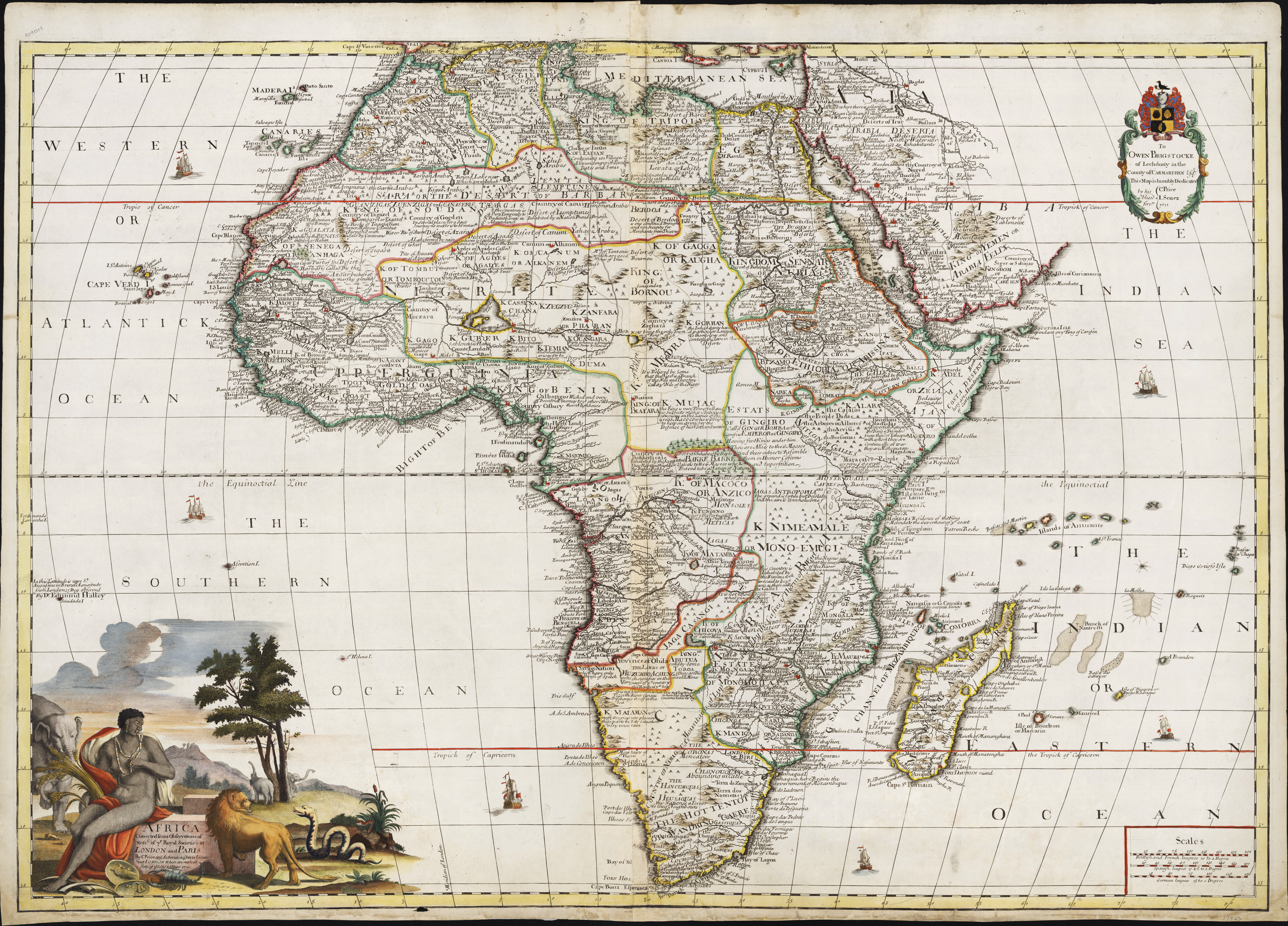
Africa, 1711, by Charles Price & John Senex. Attributed to the engraving house of George Willdey

George Willdey (1676–1737) was a British engraver and optical instrument maker. Willdey made engravings for a number of mapmakers. His shop sold maps, optical instruments, toys, china, glass, and earthenware.

Willdey engraved maps for Charles Price (with whom he partnered 1710-1713), Emanuel Bowen, Christopher Saxton, and Thomas Jeffreys, among many others.

Willdey was born in Staffordshire in 1676. He was apprenticed to John Yarwell and belonged to the trade guild Worshipful Company of Spectacle Makers. Throughout his career he took on a number of apprentices, notably including many female apprentices which was unusual for the time. His apprentices included William Gibbons (1709), Peter Elvin (1712), Hannah Martyn (1714), Susanna Ball (1715), Martha Short (1716), Walter Ray (1717), Edward Watkins (1717), Esther Sarazzin (1720), Isaac le Plastrier (1721), Rachel Jourdain (1722), Thomas Clarke (1724), Frances Willdey (1726)), Susanna Passavant (1728), Elizabeth Dupuy (1733) and Isaac King (1736).

From 1707 to 1713 he operated "At the Archemedes & Globe, Ludgate Street." sometimes described as "Archimedes and Globe next the Dog Tavern nearer Ludgate." In 1712 in partnership with Timothy Brandreth also advertised at Archimedes and Globe over against the Royal Exchange in Cornhill. In 1715 his location was described as "At the Great Toy and Print Shop, the corner of Ludgate Street, next to St. Paul's" and from 1718 to 1737 as "At the Great Toy, Spectacle, China-Ware, and Print Shop, the Corner of Ludgate Street near St. Pauls London."

Willdey died in 1737 at the age of 61. The business was carried on for two years by his wife Judith Willdey and from 1739 by his son Thomas Willdey.
