= Jewels of Martha Washington =

Jewels belonging to Martha Washington

Martha Custis Washington wearing pearls in her hair, by John Wollaston, c. 1757

The jewels of Martha Dandridge Custis Washington, the inaugural First Lady of the United States, are mostly housed at her former home, Mount Vernon in Fairfax County, Virginia. The collection includes garnet pieces, many purchased in the 1750s and 1760s, as well as jewellery made with diamonds, lead glass, amethyst, amber, and pearls. Washington was a member of the colonial American gentry and planter class and acquired many of her jewels throughout her marriages to the politicians Daniel Parke Custis and George Washington.

== Amber ==
An amber necklace owned by Washington is housed in the Smithsonian Institution's collection.

== Diamonds ==
Washington's diamond ring was likely given to her by her first husband, Daniel Parke Custis, around 1750. She later brought the ring with her to Mount Vernon during her second marriage to George Washington. The ring consists of nine diamonds set in silver collets and features a secret gold and glass locket mounted on the back side of the setting which houses a swatch of human hair.

== Garnet ==
Martha Washington's garnet jewelry collection housed at Mount Vernon

=== Earrings ===
In 1760, Washington received a pair of 3-drop garnet earrings designed by J. Grymes. These were likely worn as a set with her garnet necklaces. In 1764, she received an additional pair of earrings.

=== Necklaces ===
A garnet necklace, which was likely part of a shipment of jewelry to the Washingtons from London in 1759, dates to her early married years. The necklace was purchased by the Washington's agent from goldsmith Susanna Passavant's shop in Ludgate Hill.

A garnet rosette neckace, designed by Benjamin Gurdon & Son, was purchased for Washington in 1764. It features one hundred and seventy-eight almandite garnets set in fifteen sections, suspended from gold chains and secured by a tongued clasp featuring three garnets. The necklace is sectioned with lobed-petaled flower clusters. It was originally designed with close-coupled clusters and a matching drop pendant, but was likely refashioned in the 1820s by Washington's granddaughter, Martha Parke Custis Peter.

=== Pins ===
Washington owned a mourning pin and garnet hair pins, housed at Mount Vernon. One of her garnet hair pins featured eight garnets set in gold washed silver and backed with silver foil, arranged in a flower cluster atop a long, gold stick.

=== Rings ===
Her circular finger ring, from 1764, was made from graduated almandite garnets and set in gold-washed silver with the gems backed by foil in a closed setting.

== Paste stones ==
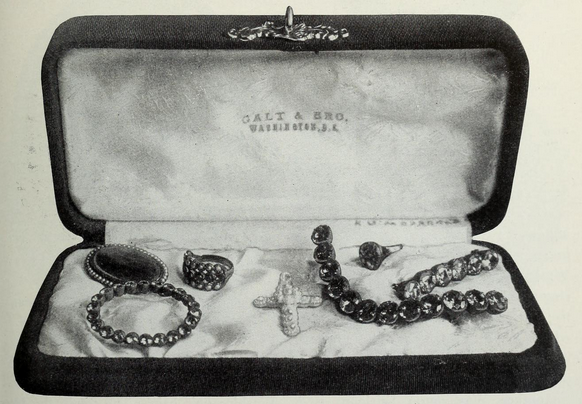
Washington and Custis family jewellery including a pearl and amethyst ring owned by Martha Washington and a cross made from her pearls

Paste stones, jewels made from high-lead glass that were cut to imitate diamonds, were exceedingly popular in Colonial America. Washington ordered paste shoe buckles for her children and herself. In 1770, she ordered a complete set featuring a paste necklace, earrings, sprig, hair combs, shoe buckles, and pins and buttons for her stomacher. A rhinestone Past Master's Masonic jewel, sold by the Washington family at the time of her death, was part of a display at the George Washington Masonic National Memorial in Alexandria, Virginia.

== Pearls ==
Washington owned a gold chain and pearl necklace, featuring seventeen freshwater pearls, dating to the late 17th or early 18th century. Her collection also included pearl pins and earrings purchased for her by George Washington.
