= Chestnut Grove (plantation) =

Plantation house in Virginia, United States

Coordinates: 37°31′3.2″N 76°58′42.3″W

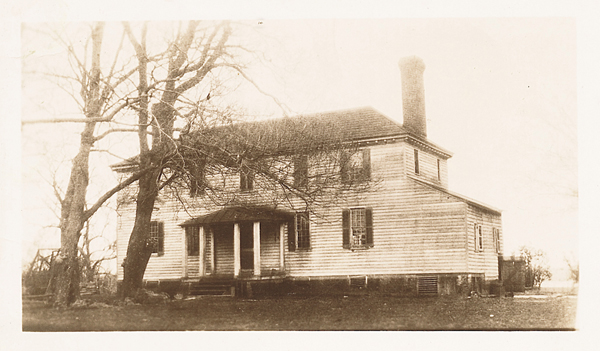
Chestnut Grove plantation where Martha Washington, wife of George Washington, was born

Chestnut Grove was an 18th-century plantation house on the Pamunkey River near New Kent Court House in New Kent County, Virginia, United States. Chestnut Grove is best known as the birthplace of Martha Washington, wife of George Washington, and the first First Lady of the United States. Martha Washington was born in the east room of the mansion.

== History ==
The two-story frame house consisting of six rooms was originally built around 1730. It was first inhabited by prominent Virginia planter John Dandridge and his wife Frances Jones. The couple raised their eight children, including Martha Washington, there. It was at Chestnut Grove that Martha married her first husband, Daniel Parke Custis, on 15 May 1750.

In 1768, Martha Washington's younger brother Bartholomew Dandridge sold Chestnut Grove and its accompanying 500 acres (2.0 km^{2}). Colonel Richard Pye Cooke then purchased the mansion in 1840. At that time, the Chestnut Grove estate contained 1,175 acres (4.76 km^{2}). Unlike neighboring plantation homes, Chestnut Grove continued to serve as a residence for 200 years in its original state until it burned down in November 1926.

== Architecture ==
Chestnut Grove's architectural details survive due to old photographs and sketches. The mansion was a two-story frame structure with a hip roof and a chimney at either end. It also contained a basement which ran the length of the mansion. The interior of Chestnut Grove was plain and paneled in pine.
