= John Dandridge =

English-born planter and politician (1700–1756)

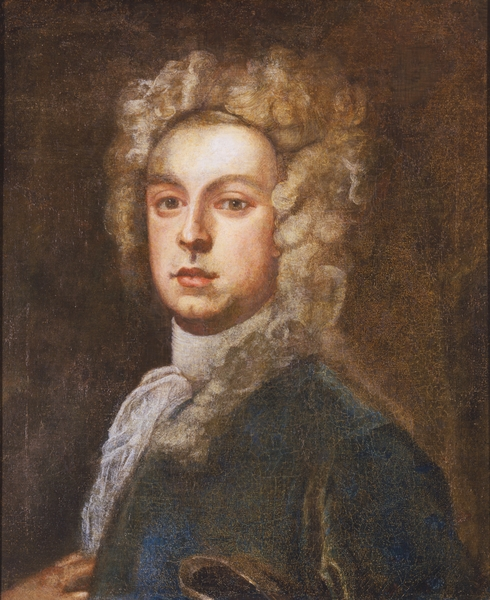
- Portrait believed to be of Dandridge, c. 1720–1740
- Born: July 14, 1700; London or Oxfordshire, Kingdom of England
- Died: August 31, 1756 (aged 56); Fredericksburg, Colony of Virginia, British America
- Resting place: St. George's Episcopal Church, Fredericksburg, Virginia
- Occupations: planter, politician, clerk
- Spouse: Frances Jones
- Children: 9, including Martha Washington and Bartholomew Dandridge
- Parents: John Dandridge, Oxfordshire (father); Bridget Dugdale (mother)

Coat of Arms of William Dandridge II

Colonel John Dandridge (July 14, 1700 – August 31, 1756) was an English-born planter and politician who served as clerk of New Kent County, Virginia from 1730 to 1756. He may be best known as the father of Bartholomew Dandridge and the first First Lady of the United States Martha Dandridge Washington. His grandson John Dandridge also served in the Virginia General Assembly.

== Ancestry and early life ==
Born on 13 July 1700 in England (either London or Oxfordshire), Dandridge was the youngest son of John Dandridge of Oxfordshire (Oxford, April 29, 1655–Oxford, 1731) and his wife Bridget Dugdale (Oxford, c. 1656–Oxford, 1731) who married in London at the church of St. Mary Magdalen in 1676. His paternal grandfather was Capt. William Dandridge I (1612–1693) and his great-grandfather was Col. Bartholomew Dandridge (1580–1638). His brother William Dandridge II continued the family naval tradition, and visited the Virginia colony, where he became a planter and merchant, as well as married and became a member of the Governor's Council of State before resuming his career as an officer of the Royal Navy. His success in Virginia prompted John to emigrate to the new colony, where he also became a planter and the other founder of the Dandridge family of Virginia, one of the First Families of Virginia.

== Marriage and children ==
Dandridge married Frances Orlando Jones (1710–1785), daughter of Orlando Jones and Martha Macon Jones West, on 22 July 1730 in New Kent County, Virginia. The couple had eight children: (Note: Some sources have stated that John Dandridge was also the father of a mixed-race woman known as Ann Dandridge Costin. An 1871 Congressional report about DC public schools quotes Ann's granddaughter "Ann Dandridge was the daughter of a half-breed, (Indian and colored), her grandfather being a Cherokee chief, and her reputed father was the father of Martha Dandridge, afterwards Mrs. Custis, who, in 1759, was married to General Washington." though others say that it was not Ann who was a descendant of John Dandridge but rather a William Costin who was Martha Dandridge Custis Washington's grandson through her son John Parke Custis, (commonly referred to as "Jacky" or "Jack").)

- Martha Dandridge Custis Washington (1731–1802)
- John Dandridge III (1733–1749)
- William Dandridge III (1734–1776)
- Bartholomew Dandridge II (1737–1785), father of John Dandridge (delegate)
- Anna Maria Dandridge Bassett (1739–1777)
- Frances Dandridge (1744–1757)
- Elizabeth Dandridge Aylett Henley (1749–1800)
- Mary Dandridge (1756–1763)

== Career and residences ==
Following their marriage in 1730, John and Frances moved to their new home on the banks of the Pamunkey River in New Kent County, Virginia, Chestnut Grove. John Dandridge became Clerk for New Kent County and kept that position for the next 26 years. He was a prominent planter, and a colonel in his military district, as well as a vestryman and churchwarden for St. Peter's Church.

Along with Chestnut Grove in New Kent County, John Dandridge also owned a house in the colony's capital, Williamsburg, and visited there frequently.

While not at sea as a merchant or royal naval officer, his older brother, William Dandridge II (1689–1743), operated a plantation on the opposite bank of the river with his wife Unity West Dandridge, daughter of prominent landowner Capt. Nathaniel West and his wife Martha Woodard Macon. Their estate, Elsing Green, was in King William County.

== Later life ==
Dandridge died on 31 August 1756 at the age of 56 while visiting his niece and her husband, Alexander Spottswood, in Fredericksburg, Virginia. Dandridge is interred at St. George's Episcopal Church burial ground in Fredericksburg. Chestnut Grove burned down in 1926, but its former site was only four miles from the location of the current county courthouse for New Kent.
