= Slaterville, Virginia =

Unincorporated community in Virginia, US

Coordinates: 37°29′57″N 76°56′32″W

Slaterville is an unincorporated community in New Kent County, Virginia, United States.
