= Martha Washington =

First Lady of the United States from 1789 to 1797

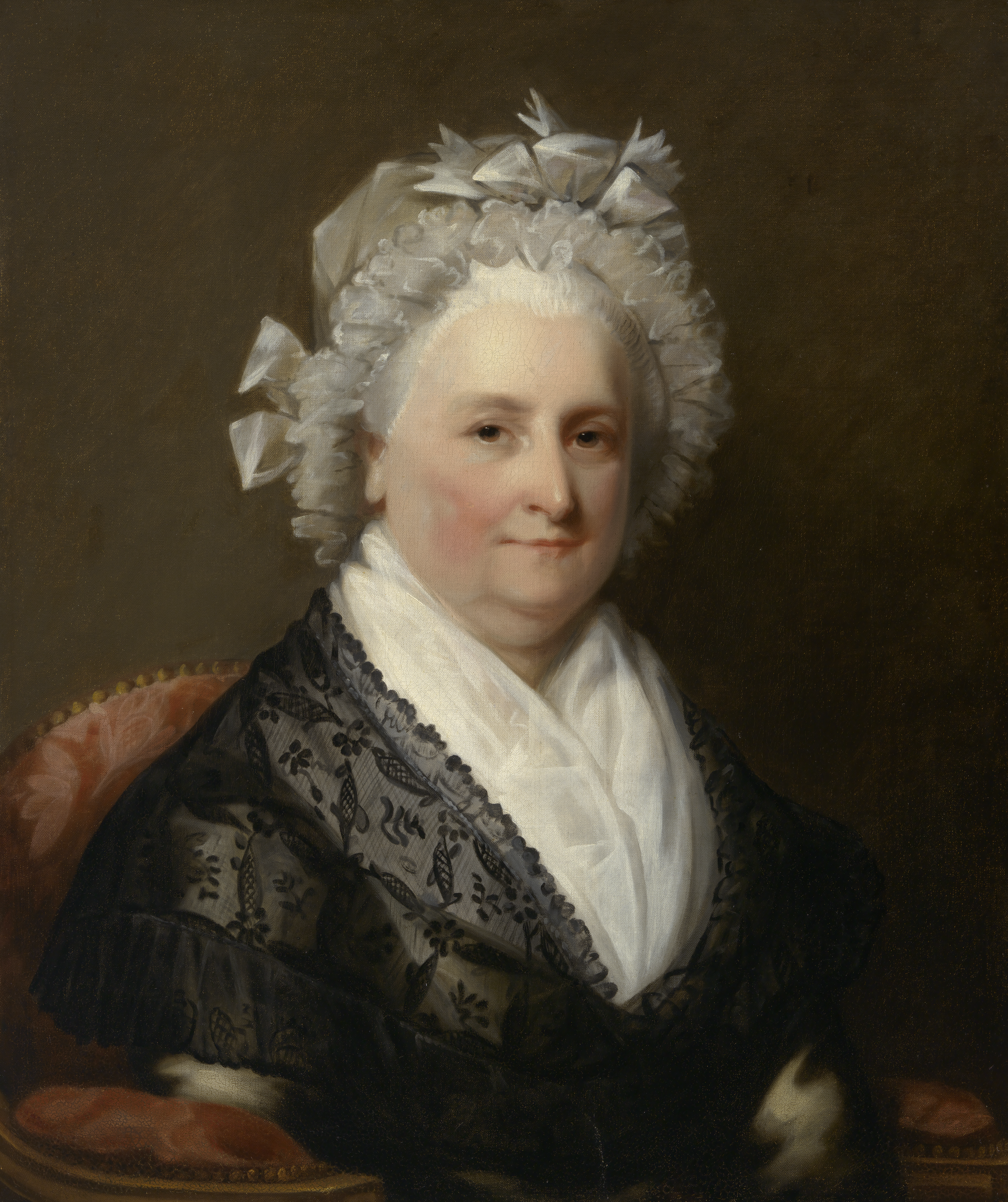
- Portrait after Gilbert Stuart c. 1800–1825

First Lady of the United States
- In role April 30, 1789 – March 4, 1797
- President: George Washington
- Preceded by: Position established
- Succeeded by: Abigail Adams

Personal details
- Born: Martha Dandridge; June 2, 1731 Chestnut Grove, Virginia, British America
- Died: May 22, 1802 (aged 70) Mount Vernon, Virginia, U.S.
- Resting place: Mount Vernon, Virginia, U.S. 38°42′24.6″N 77°05′19.4″W
- Spouses: Daniel Parke Custis (m. 1750; died 1757) George Washington (m. 1759; died 1799)
- Children: 4, including John Parke Custis and Martha Parke Custis
- Parent(s): John Dandridge; Frances Jones

Martha Washington (previously Custis, née Dandridge; June 2, 1731 O.S. – May 22, 1802) was the wife of George Washington, who was a Founding Father and the first president of the United States. Although the title was not coined until after her death, she served as the inaugural first lady of the United States, defining the role of the president's wife and setting many precedents that future first ladies observed. During her tenure, she was referred to as "Lady Washington". Washington is consistently ranked in the upper half of first ladies by historians.

Martha Dandridge married Daniel Parke Custis on May 15, 1750. They had four children, only one of whom survived to adulthood. She was widowed in July 1757 at the age of 26, inheriting a large estate, and remarried to George Washington in January 1759 at the age of 27, moving to his plantation, Mount Vernon. Her youngest daughter died of epilepsy in 1773, and the Washingtons were unable to conceive any children of their own. Washington became a symbol of the American Revolution after her husband was appointed commander-in-chief of the Continental Army. During the war, she played a maternal role, visiting encampments when fighting stalled each winter. Her only surviving child, John Parke Custis, died from a camp illness during the war. After the war ended in 1783, she sought retirement at Mount Vernon, but returned to public life when her husband became president of the United States in 1789.

Lady Washington took on the social role of the president's wife reluctantly, becoming a national celebrity in the process. She found this life unpleasant, feeling that she was restricted and wishing for retirement. In addition to hosting weekly social events, Washington understood that how she composed herself would reflect on the nation, both domestically and abroad. As such, she struck a careful balance between the dignity associated with a head of state's wife and the humility associated with republican government. The Washingtons returned to Mount Vernon in 1797, and Washington spent her retirement years greeting admirers and advising her successors. She was widowed for a second time in 1799, and she died a few years later in 1802.

== Early life (1731–1748) ==
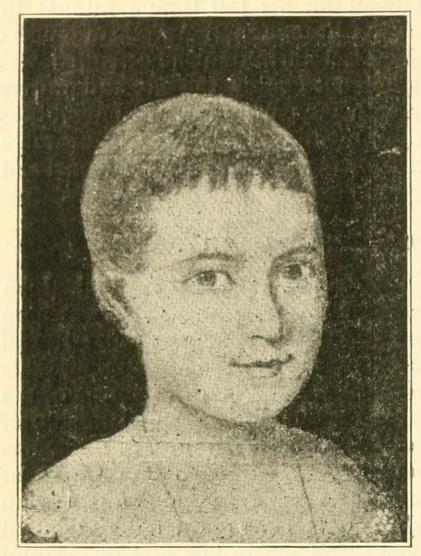
Dandridge at age eight

Coat of Arms of William Dandridge II

Martha Dandridge was born on June 2, 1731, on her parents' tobacco plantation, Chestnut Grove Plantation in New Kent County the Colony of Virginia. She was the oldest daughter of Frances Jones, herself the daughter of the politician Orlando Jones and granddaughter of an Anglican rector, and John Dandridge, a Virginia planter and county clerk who emigrated from England. She had three brothers and four sisters: John (1733–1749), William (1734–1776), Bartholomew (1737–1785), Anna Maria "Fanny" Bassett (1739–1777), Frances Dandridge (1744–1757), Elizabeth Aylett Henley (1749–1800), and Mary Dandridge (1756–1763). As the oldest of eight, including one sister that was 25 years her junior, Dandridge played a maternal and domestic role beginning early in life. Dandridge may have also had an illegitimate half-sister born into slavery, Ann Dandridge Costin, and an illegitimate white half-brother, Ralph Dandridge.

Dandridge's father was well connected with the Virginia aristocracy despite his relative lack of wealth, and she was taught to behave as a woman of the upper class. Dandridge received a relatively high-quality education for the daughter of a planter, though it was still inferior to that of her brothers. She took to equestrianism, at one point riding her horse up and down the stairs of her uncle's home and escaping chastisement because her father was so impressed by her skill.

=== Frances Jones Dandridge ===
Frances Jones Dandridge
- Born: Frances Jones; August 6, 1710
- Died: April 9, 1785 (aged 74)
- Spouse: John Dandridge (m. 1730)
- Children: Martha Dandridge Custis Washington; John Dandridge; William Dandridge; Bartholomew Dandridge; Anna Maria "Fanny" Dandridge Bassett; Frances Dandridge; Elizabeth Dandridge Aylett Henley; Mary Dandridge
- Parent(s): Orlando Jones; Martha Macon
- Relatives: Lane Jones (brother)

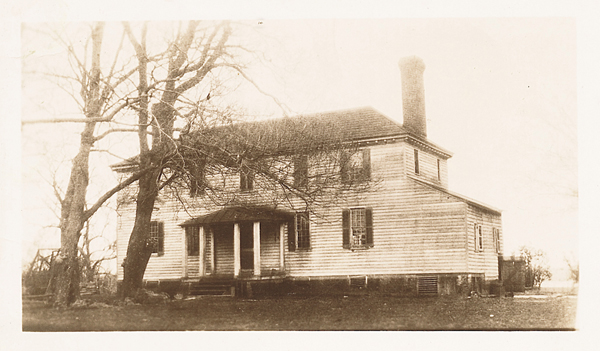
Chestnut Grove plantation (1919 photograph)

Frances Jones Dandridge (August 6, 1710 – April 9, 1785), nicknamed Fanny, was Martha's mother. Fanny was born in 1710 on a plantation near Williamsburg near the capital on Queen's Creek. Fanny had an older brother, Lane Jones, born in 1707. Fanny's father, Orlando Jones, was a Burgess for New Kent County in 1718 in the House of Burgesses, the leading legislative body in Colonial Virginia. Her mother (m. January 31, 1702), Martha Macon Jones (Saint Peter, New Kent County, 1687-Macon's Island, Williamsburg, May 4, 1716), was the daughter of Colonel Gideon Macon, (Note: Her maternal grandfather, Col. Gideon Macon was a member of the House of Burgesses from 1696 to 1702, and was secretary to Sir William Berkeley, governor of Virginia, during his second term in office. Upon Col. Macon's death in 1702, his widow, Martha Woodward Macon, married Captain Nathaniel West who was also a representative in the House of Burgesses. Captain Nathaniel West and Martha Woodward Macon West had two children. Their daughter, Unity West, married John Dandridge's brother, William Dandridge. William Dandridge was appointed to the Governor's Council in 1727, the highest political position available to colony residents.) died when Fanny was only six years old. Her father soon remarried. His second wife, Mary Elizabeth William Jones, became the sole parent of the two children just three years later when Orlando Jones died. Orlando and Mary had no children together. A year later, Orlando's widow Mary Elizabeth married John James Flourney and her stepchildren lived with them in Williamsburg. The union of Flourneys brought more children into the household. While the Jones children lived with their guardians, the Flourneys had a right to use the income from the Queen's Creek property for their household. Anna Maria Jones Timson, the sister of the late Orlando Jones sued twice for custody of her niece and nephew but was denied. When Lane Jones reached the age of eighteen, he legally emancipated himself and moved in with his aunt in Timson's Neck. In 1726, when Fanny was sixteen, she also sued for emancipation. She did not move in with her aunt but instead lived with a planter in New Kent. Her mother's parents had been from that region and a number of Macon aunts and uncles lived there. She may have lived with Unity West Dandridge, her mother's half-sister, who had married William Dandridge in 1719.

Fanny Jones married John Dandridge on July 22, 1730. Fanny inherited ten enslaved people and land in King William County from her father, which she brought to the marriage. The Dandridges lived at the Chestnut Grove plantation on the bank of the Pamunkey River in New Kent County, Virginia. Located about 35 miles from Williamsburg, it was a two-story frame house that was surrounded by fruit and chestnut trees. Dandridge immigrated to the Virginia Colony in 1714 or 1715. (Note: Or by 1715. His father was a merchant and an artist.) Born to John and Ann Dandridge of England, he immigrated with his older brother William Dandridge (1689–1743). He and his wife Unity West Dandridge, an heiress, lived on the opposite bank of the river from Chestnut Grove at his Elsing Green estate in King William County, Virginia.

The Dandridges had eight children, of whom Martha was the first. She lost a number of children through miscarriages and stillbirths.

After her husband's death in 1756, Fanny and three of her children–William, Mary, and Elizabeth—continued to live at Chestnut Grove. Fanny was 46 years old and had just given birth to her last child that year.At age 22, William took over management of the plantation. Bartholomew listed Chestnut Grove for sale in 1768. (Note: Chestnut Grove Plantation burned down in 1926.) Fanny moved to Pamocra, where she died in April 1785, within days of the death of her son Bartholomew, and they were buried in the one-acre graveyard. (Note: Martha Washington was informed of her brother and mother's death at the same dispatch.)

One of their sons, Bartholomew Dandridge, followed in his father's footsteps and became Clerk of Courts in New Kent County. And he, like his father, also served as both vestryman and churchwarden, but at the Blisland Parish rather than the St. Peter's Parish. John Dandridge had two illegitimate children: Ann Dandridge Costin and Ralph Dandridge.

== Marriage to Daniel Parke Custis (1749–1757) ==
In 1749, Dandridge met Daniel Parke Custis, the son of a wealthy planter in Virginia. They wished to marry, but the father of Dandridge's prospective groom, John Custis, was highly selective of what woman would marry into the family's fortune. She eventually won his approval, and Dandridge married Custis, who was two decades her senior, on May 15, 1750. After they were married, Custis moved with her husband to his residence at White House Plantation on the Pamunkey River, where they had four children: Daniel Jr. (1751–1754), Frances (1753–1757), John (1754–1781), and Martha (1756–1773). Daniel Parke Custis was one of the wealthiest men in the Virginia colony as well as one of the largest slaveowners, owning nearly 300 slaves.

Portrait of Martha Dandridge Custis by John Wollaston, c. 1757

Custis became a widow at the age of 26 when Daniel Parke Custis died (probably from a severe throat infection). Upon his death, Custis inherited the large estate that her husband had previously inherited from his father, John Custis. She also received one third of his estate outright, and the remaining two thirds were granted to their two young children. The total inheritance amounted to approximately $33,000 (equivalent to $1,167,043 in 2025), 17,000 acres of land, and hundreds of slaves. The legal and financial matters of the inheritance presented a considerable burden on Custis while she was raising her two surviving children and grieving the losses of her husband, two children, and her father. She was also left with the responsibility of managing the farmland and overseeing the well-being of the slaves. According to her biographer, "she capably ran the five plantations left to her when her first husband died, bargaining with London merchants for the best tobacco prices".

== Early years of marriage to George Washington (1758–1774) ==
=== Courtship and wedding ===
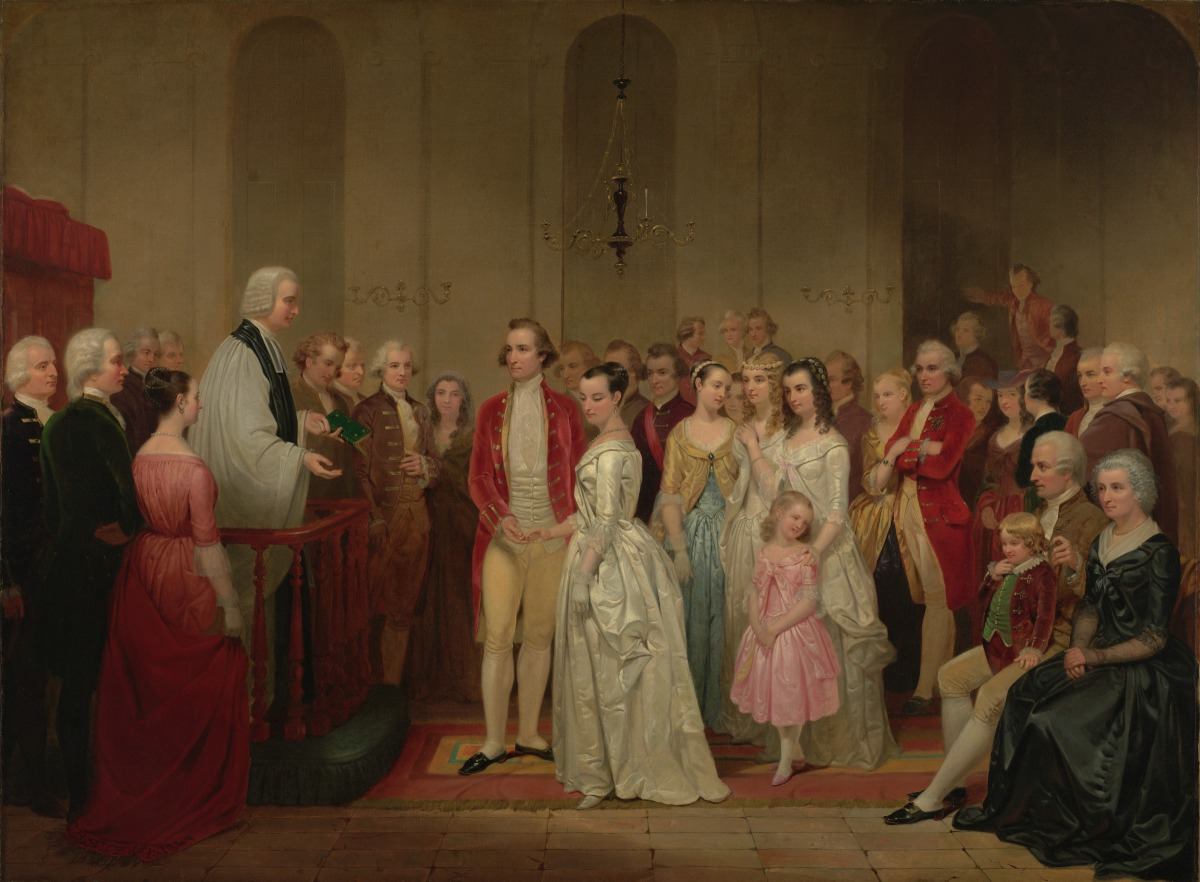
The Marriage of Washington to Martha Custis by Junius Brutus Stears (1849)

By one account Custis met George Washington during the Williamsburg social season, and they courted over the following months during his leaves from the military. By another, they were introduced by Colonel Chamberlayne, a mutual acquaintance, when they both stayed the night at his home in May 1758. They married on January 6, 1759, at the White House plantation.

The couple honeymooned at the Custis family's White House plantation, followed by a stay in Williamsburg, where her husband was a representative in the House of Burgesses, before setting up house at his Mount Vernon estate. At the time of their wedding, she was one of the wealthiest widows in the Thirteen Colonies. Their marriage remained happy over the following 40 years, in part because of their similar worldviews. It was a marriage based in mutual respect and shared habits, with both maintaining similar schedules in day-to-day life and both prioritizing family and image over excitement and vice.

=== Mount Vernon ===
From 1759 to 1775, the Washingtons lived at Mount Vernon where they tended to their plantation. Washington ran the household and regularly entertained visitors. She knitted and oversaw the making of clothes, and she became talented in curing meat in their smokehouse. Washington entertained almost daily, having visitors for dinner or for longer stays as the family became more prominent in the political and social life of Virginia. Washington's husband used her wealth to expand their home at Mount Vernon and turn it into a profitable estate.

The Washingtons had no children together, but they raised Martha's two surviving children. She was highly protective of them, especially after her two previous children had died and Patsy was found to have epilepsy. In 1773, Patsy died at age 17 during an epileptic seizure. Washington's last surviving child, John, left King's College that fall and married Eleanor Calvert in February 1774. The Washingtons hoped for more children throughout their marriage, but they were unable to conceive.

== American Revolution (1775–1789) ==
=== Early revolution ===
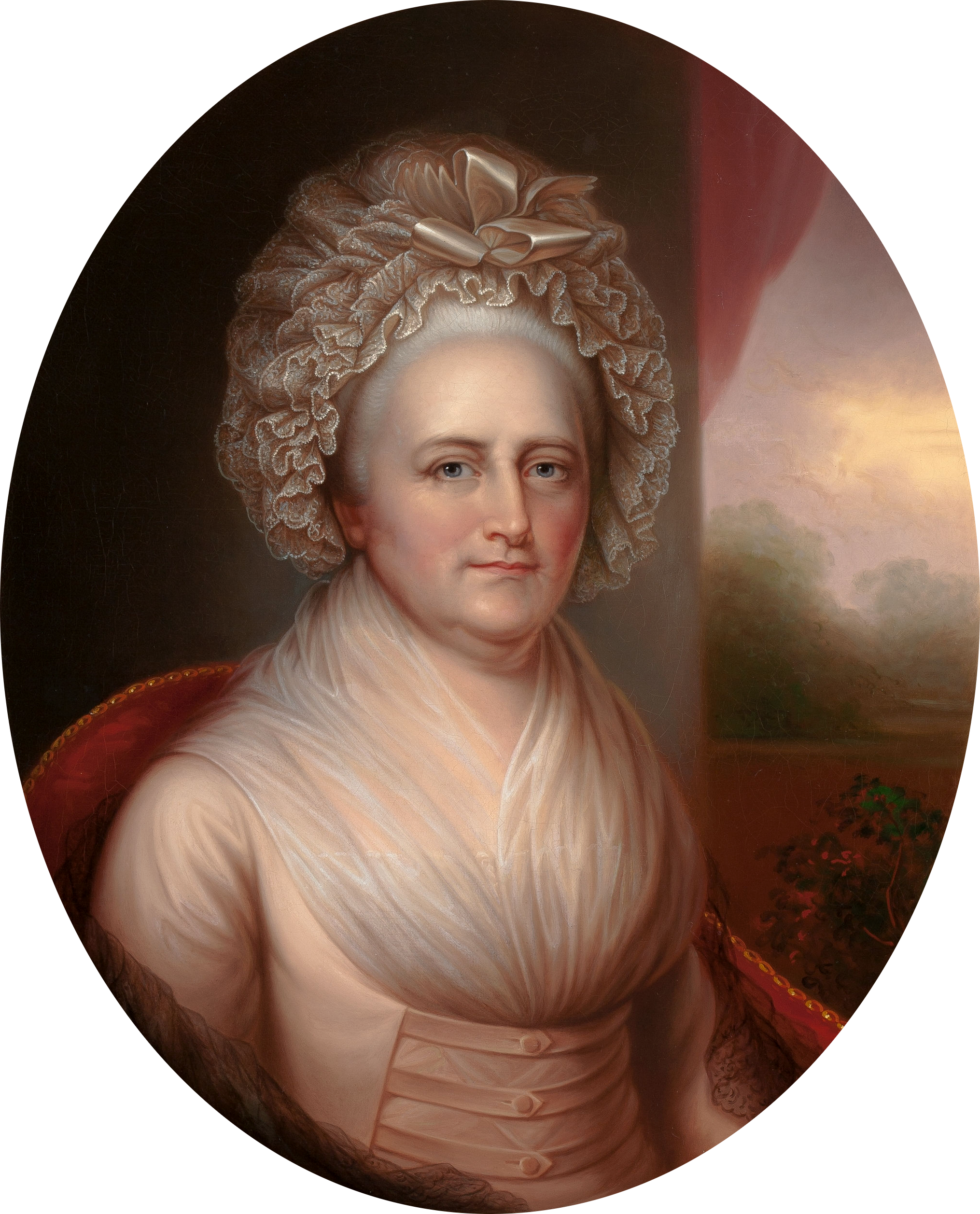
Martha Washington by Rembrandt Peale, circa 1856, based on a portrait by his father, Charles Willson Peale

Life for the Washingtons was interrupted as the American Revolution escalated in the 1770s. Though rumors were spread that she was a Loyalist, Washington consistently shared her husband's political beliefs. She strongly supported his role in the Patriot movement and his work to advance his beliefs in the cause. She stayed at Mount Vernon when he was appointed commander-in-chief of the Continental Army in 1775, overseeing the construction of new wings to their home. She then moved to the home of her brother-in-law so as not to be so conspicuous a target during the American Revolutionary War.

The revolution was the first time in their marriage that they were apart for an extended period. In the fall of 1775, Washington traveled to Massachusetts to meet with her husband. On the journey north, she experienced her newfound celebrity status for the first time as the wife of a famed general. She joined him in Cambridge, from where he and the other Continental Army officers were operating. While staying in Cambridge, she served as a hostess for guests of the officers. She would also sew clothes for the soldiers while at camp, encouraging other officers' wives to do the same, leading to the creation of a sewing circle that contributed to the war effort. Though she hid it from those around her, Washington was frightened by the gunfire that could be heard from the nearby Siege of Boston. She accompanied her husband when operations were relocated to New York, but she was sent to Philadelphia as British forces came closer. Each spring, when conflict resumed, she returned to Mount Vernon.

=== Independent United States ===
The American Revolution became increasingly stressful for Martha after the signing of the Declaration of Independence, as George faced increased risks on the battlefield. Each winter, Washington would join her husband at his encampment while fighting was stalled. The quality of her housing varied during these visits, both in comfort and in safety. General Gilbert Lafayette observed that she loved "her husband madly". Washington was kept informed of the war's developments by her husband, sometimes performing clerical work for him, and she was even permitted to know military secrets. She became a symbol of the war effort, alongside George Washington, as a grandmotherly figure that cared for the soldiers.

The Continental Army settled in Valley Forge, the third of the eight winter encampments of the Revolution, on December 19, 1777. Washington traveled 10 days and hundreds of miles to join her husband in Pennsylvania. On April 6, Elizabeth Drinker and three friends arrived at Valley Forge to plead with the General to release their husbands from jail; the men, all Quakers, had refused to swear a loyalty oath to the American revolutionaries. Because the commander was not available at first, the women visited with Martha. Drinker described her later in her diary as "a sociable pretty kind of Woman".

Washington's son John was serving as a civilian aide to his father during the siege of Yorktown in 1781 when he died of "camp fever", a diagnosis for epidemic typhus. After his death, she and George took in the youngest two of John's four children, Eleanor (Nelly) Parke Custis and George Washington Parke (Washy) Custis. The Washingtons also provided personal and financial support to the children of many of their relatives and friends.

=== Postwar retirement ===
The Washingtons returned to Mount Vernon in 1783. They stayed at Mount Vernon for much of the Confederation period, living in retirement with their nephew, nieces, and grandchildren. Washington, now in poorer health, believed that her husband was finished with public service. She spent her time raising their grandchildren, constantly worried for their health after having all four of her children and many other relatives die of illness. She also resumed hosting company at Mount Vernon, recruiting several of her nieces and other young women to assist her, as the house was overwhelmed with visitors. Their life at Mount Vernon was interrupted again when he was asked to participate at the Constitutional Convention in 1787 and again when he was chosen as the first president of the United States in 1789.

== First Lady of the United States (1789–1797) ==
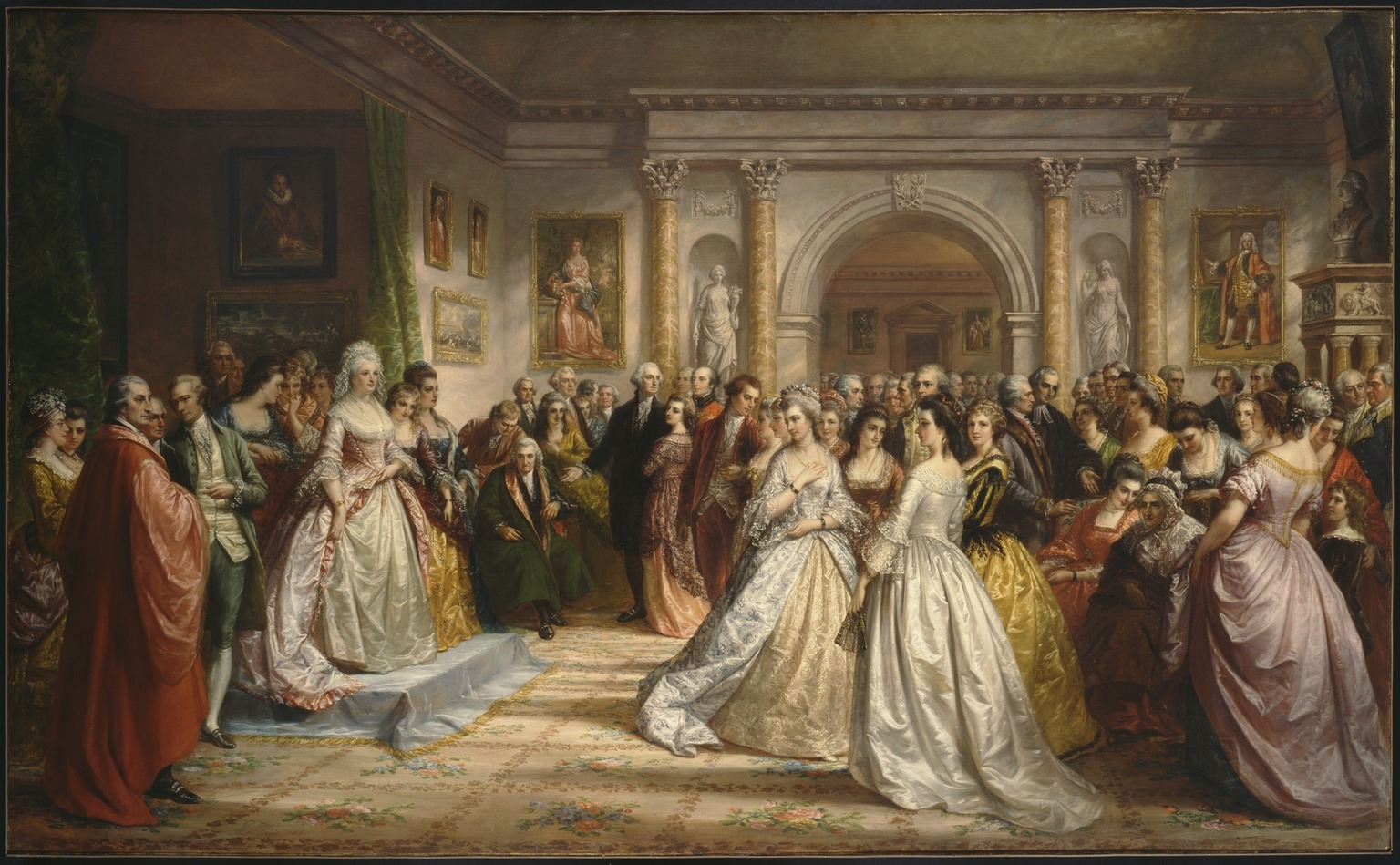
Republican Court, or, Lady Washington's Reception Day by Daniel Huntington (c. 1861)

After the war, Washington was not fully supportive of her husband's agreeing to be president of the newly formed United States. She did not immediately join him at the capital in New York City, only arriving in May 1789. The journey was followed by the press, which was unprecedented in the attention that it paid to a woman's actions, and the entourage was met with admirers and fanfare in each town that it passed through. It was during this journey that she gave her only public speech as first lady, thanking those that came to see her. She arrived on the presidential barge, escorted by her husband, immediately establishing the president's wife as a public figure. After arriving at the capital, Washington became the inaugural First Lady of the United States, though the term would not be used until later. Instead, she was referred to as "Lady Washington".

As the inaugural first lady, many of Washington's practices became traditions for future first ladies, including the opening of the presidential mansion (later, the White House) to the public on New Year's Day, a practice that would continue until the presidency of Herbert Hoover. She hosted many affairs of state at New York City and Philadelphia during their years as temporary capitals. Taking her responsibility as the lady of the house seriously, Washington returned the official calls of every lady that left her card at the heavily-trafficked presidential home to ensure that everyone could reach the president, always doing so within three days.

Washington was also tasked by her husband with the responsibility of hosting drawing room events on Fridays in which ladies were permitted to attend. She would remain seated during such events while the president greeted their guests. The guests were at first uncertain as to whether they should follow the royal custom of waiting for the hostess to leave before they do, and she resolved the issue by announcing her husband always retired at nine. She was careful during these events to avoid political talk, encouraging a change of subject when it came up. The social circles that developed among those in American politics at this time became known as the Republican Court.

=== Personal life ===
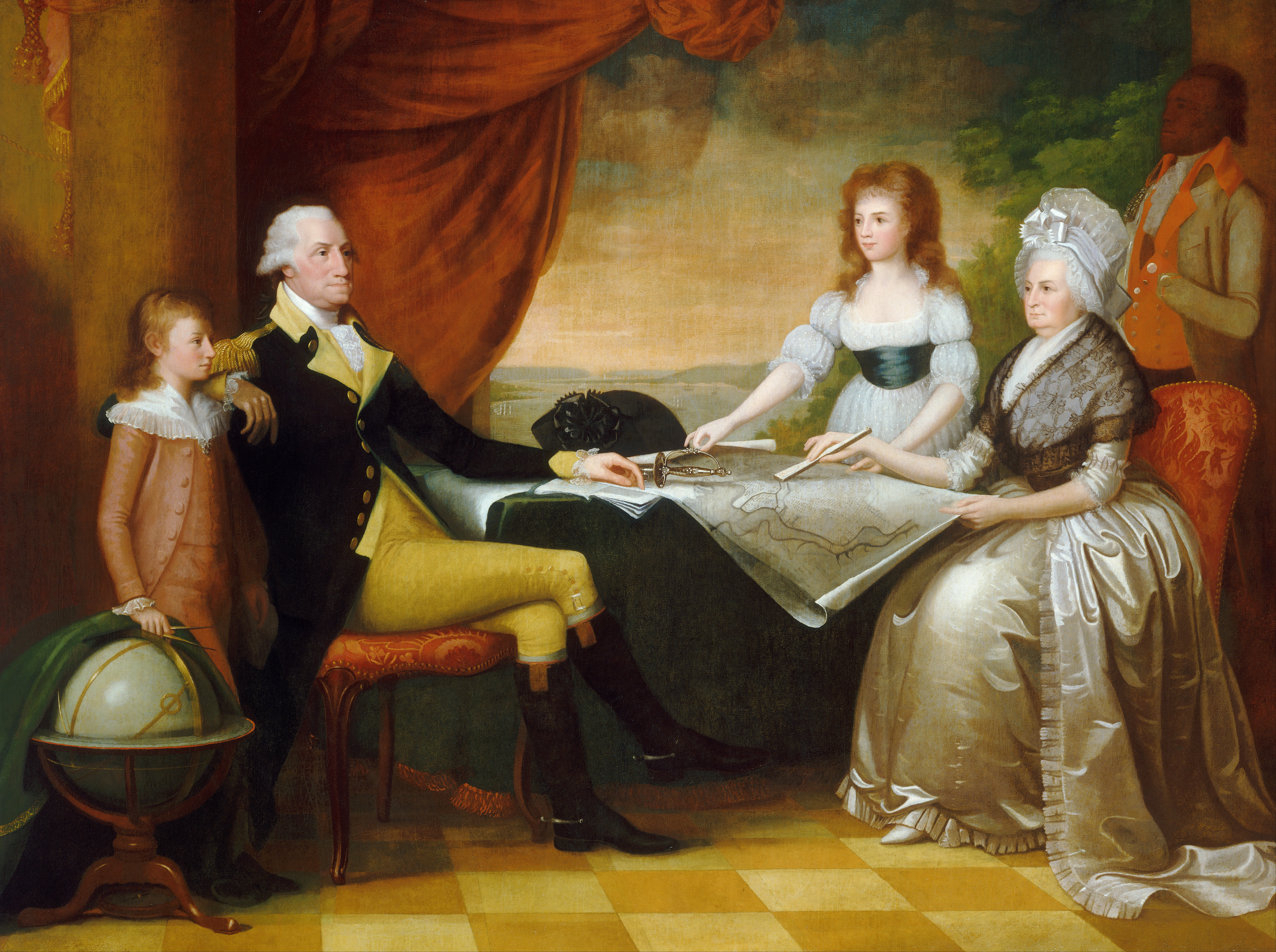
The Washington Family by Edward Savage

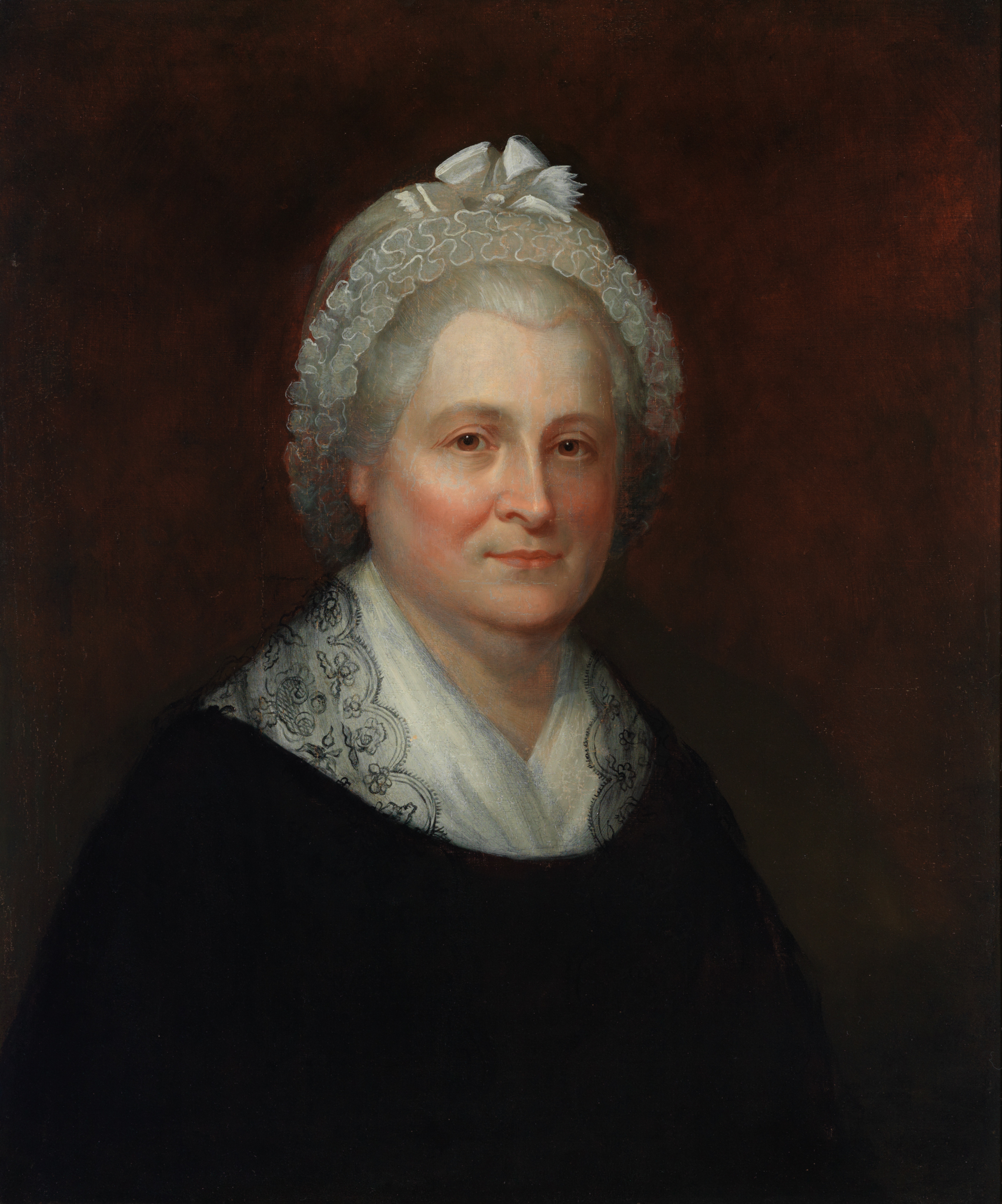
Portrait of Martha Washington by Rembrandt Peale, c. 1796

The first presidential residence was a house on Cherry Street, followed by a house on Broadway. The capital was moved to Philadelphia in 1790, and the presidential residence again moved, this time to a house on High Street (now Market Street). Washington much preferred the Philadelphia residence, as it had a greater social life and was closer to Mount Vernon. Early in her husband's presidency, she had little opportunity to go out, as any action she took would have political implications. After their move to Philadelphia, the Washingtons loosened their self-imposed limits on personal activity. While serving as first lady, Washington became close to Polly Lear, the wife of her husband's secretary Tobias Lear. She also associated with Lucy Flucker Knox, wife of war secretary Henry Knox, and Abigail Adams, the second lady. The time she spent with her grandchildren was another high point for Washington, who would sometimes take them to shows and museums. She also made a point of frequently attending church, owing to her firm Episcopalian beliefs.

Washington was fond of garnet jewellery, and acquired her own large collection of jewels.

Washington was forced to take control of the presidential residence at one point shortly after her husband's presidency began, forbidding guests from entering, as he was undergoing the removal of a tumor. In July 1790, artist John Trumbull gave Washington a full-length portrait painting of her husband as a gift. It was displayed in their home at Mount Vernon in the New Room. When she learned that her husband might take on a second term as president, she uncharacteristically protested against the decision. Despite her opposition, he was reelected in 1793, and she reluctantly accepted four more years as the wife of the president. The young Georges Washington de La Fayette joined the Washington family in 1795 while his father, Gilbert Lafayette, was held as a political prisoner in France. He would live with the Washingtons until fall of 1797. In 1796, Washington's slave and personal maid Oney Judge escaped and fled to New Hampshire. Despite Washington's insistence to her husband that Judge should be returned and again should be Washington's slave, the president did not attempt to pursue Judge. Washington's tenure as first lady ended in 1797.

=== Public image ===
As the wife of both the head of government and the head of state, Washington was immediately faced with the pressure of representing the United States. She had to present the United States as a dignified nation to establish credibility among the countries of Europe, but she also had to respect the spirit of democracy by refusing to present herself as a queen. She was also aware that the precedent she set would be inherited by future presidential wives. Washington balanced these responsibilities by playing the role of a social hostess at presidential events, a role that would become the primary function of the first lady. In turn, this made the position of first lady an important point of contact between the president and the people.

Washington presented an image of herself as an amiable wife, but privately she complained about the restrictions placed on her life. She found the pageantry of the presidency to be boring and artificial. Washington was not exempt from the political attacks often levied at her husband's administration by opposition-owned newspapers. While her social role was celebrated by her husband's supporters, the anti-Federalists criticized her as emulating royalty and encouraging aristocracy. At the same time, other critics accused her social activities of being too informal. To her displeasure, she found that she was constantly the subject of public attention, and she was forced to pay increased attention to her hair and clothes each day. Despite this, she still opted to dress simply in homespun clothes, feeling that it was more appropriate in a republic.

== Later life and death (1797–1802) ==
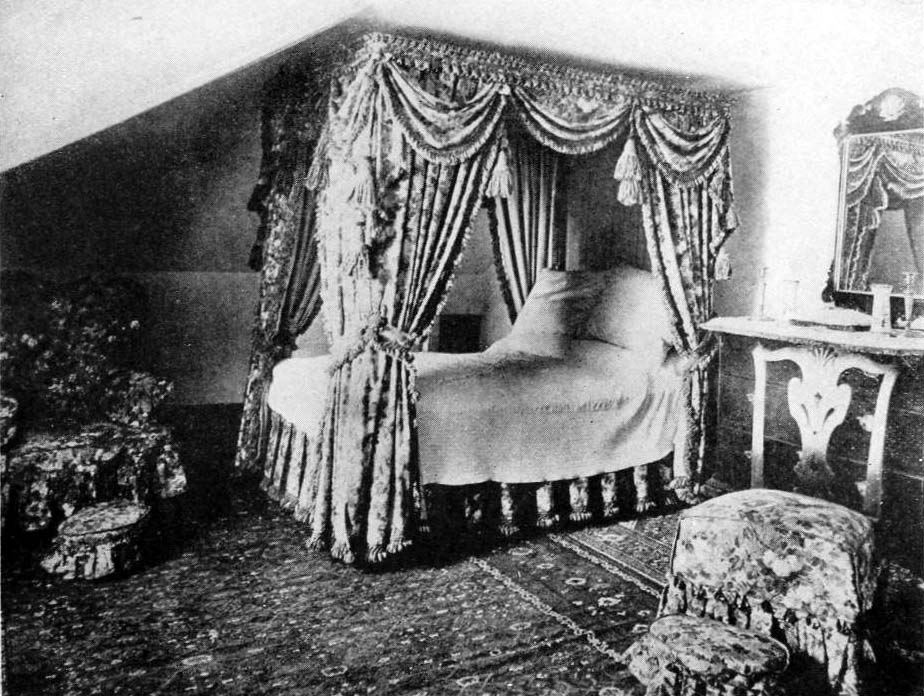
Washington's chambers after her husband's death

The Washingtons left the capital immediately after the inauguration of John Adams, making the return journey to Mount Vernon, which by then had begun to decay. Again they went into retirement, and they saw to several renovations for their home. In the years after the presidency, the Washingtons received more visitors than ever, from friends and strangers alike. They eventually took in one of the former president's nephews, Lawrence Lewis, to serve as secretary, and he would eventually marry Washington's granddaughter Nelly.

Washington feared that her husband would again be called away to lead a provisional army against France, but no such conflict took place. Her husband died of a severe throat infection on December 14, 1799, at the age of 67. As a widow, Washington spent her final years living in a garret where she knitted, sewed, and responded to letters. Though Washington was the legal owner of her husband's property, she gave control of its business affairs to her relatives. She also inherited her husband's slaves on the condition that they be freed upon her death. Fearing that these slaves might hurt her, Washington freed them. She did not have the authority to free her dower slaves, and Washington chose not to free the one slave, Elish, whom she personally owned.

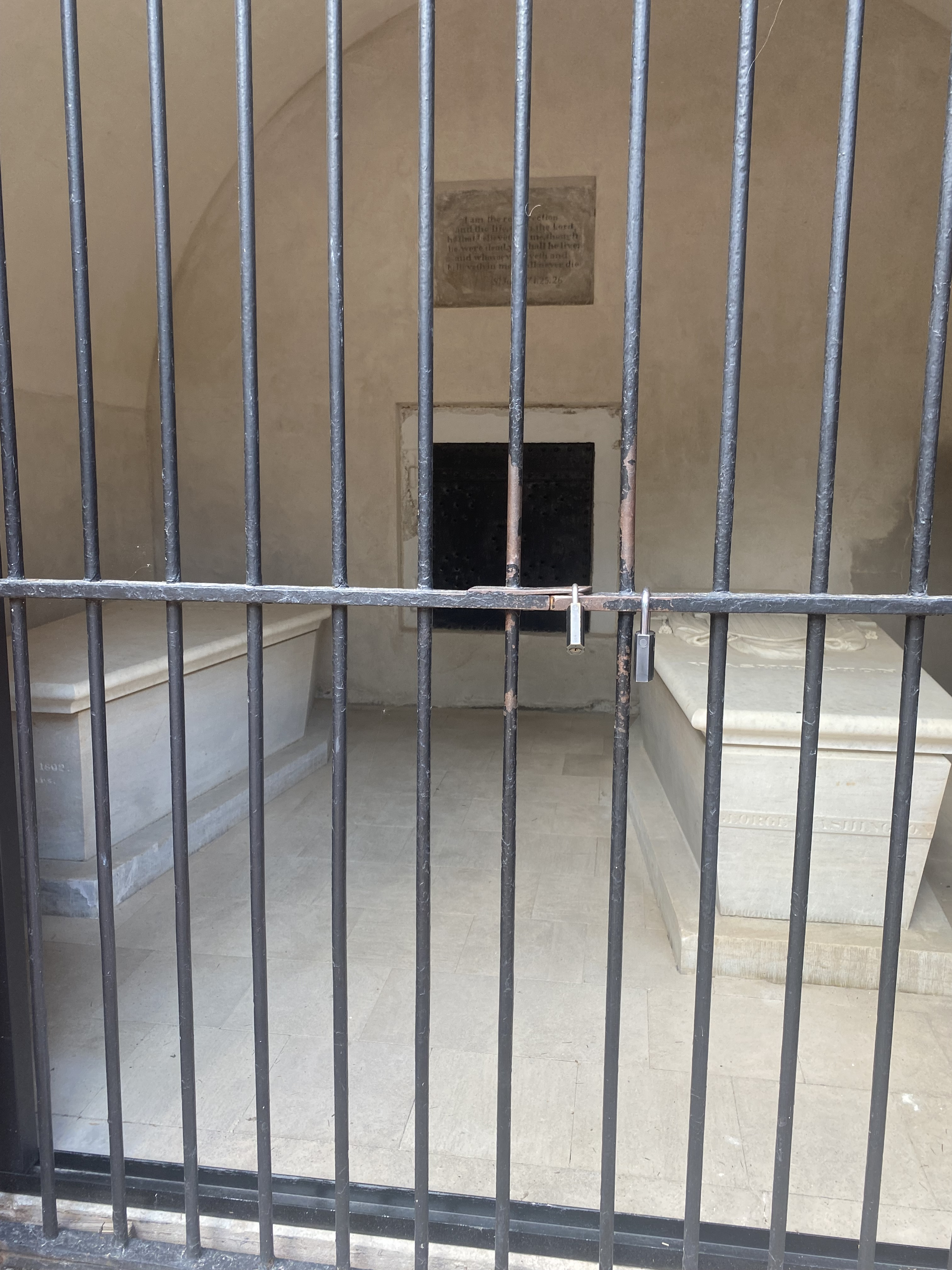
Tomb of George Washington (right) and Martha Washington (left)

Washington retained an interest in the presidency after her tenure as first lady, beginning the tradition of advising her successors. The Washington family long disliked Thomas Jefferson and Jeffersonian politics, in part because of the central role he played in criticizing the Washington administration. Washington took offense when Jefferson became president, as she felt that he did not give adequate respect to the office.

Washington's health, always somewhat precarious, declined after her husband's death. She had anticipated her death since that of her husband. When she developed a fever in 1802, Washington burned all of her husband's letters to her, summoned a clergyman to administer last communion, and chose her funeral dress. Two and a half years after the death of her husband, Washington died on May 22, 1802, at age 70. Following her death, Washington's body was interred in the original Washington family tomb vault at Mount Vernon. In 1831, the surviving executors of George's estate removed the bodies of the Washingtons from the old vault to a similar structure within the present enclosure at Mount Vernon.

== Legacy ==
Just as her husband had set the precedent for the presidency, Washington established what would eventually become the role of first lady. She was prominent in the ceremonial aspects of the presidency, assisting her husband in his role as head of state, but she had very little public involvement in his administrative role as head of government. This would be the standard of presidential wives for the next century. Washington was recognized for her humility and her mild-mannered nature, to the point that her contemporaries were often taken by surprise when meeting her. No personal records of Washington exist from before the death of her first husband, and she destroyed many letters that she had written since then. Many recipients of her letters kept them, however, and those letters have been preserved in archives such as at Mount Vernon and the Virginia Historical Society. Several collections of these letters have been published.

=== Honors ===
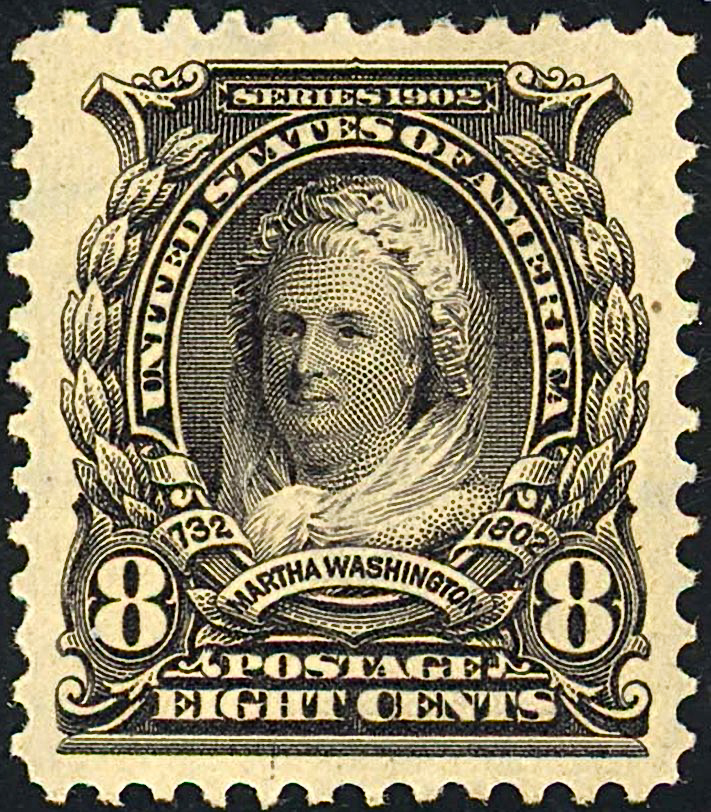
Martha Washington 1902 issue stamp

During the Revolutionary War, one of the regiments at Valley Forge named themselves "Lady Washington's Dragoon" in her honor.The Martha Washington College for Women was founded in Abingdon, Virginia in 1860. It was merged with Emory & Henry College in 1918, and the main original building of Martha Washington College was converted to the Martha Washington Inn. Martha Washington Seminary, a finishing school for young women in Washington, DC, was opened in 1905, and it ceased operations in 1949.

A postage stamp featuring Martha Washington, the first stamp to honor an American woman, was issued as part of the 1902 stamp series. An 8-cent stamp, it was printed in violet-black ink. The second stamp issued in her honor, a 4-cent definitive stamp printed in yellow-brown ink, was released in 1923. A 1 1/2-cent stamp was issued in 1938 to honor Washington as part of the Presidential Issue series. Washington's image was featured on the one dollar silver certificate banknote beginning in 1886, making her the second woman to appear on an American banknote after Pocahontas. To prevent confusion with existing coinage, pattern coins testing new metals have been produced by the U.S. mint, or a company contracted to it, with Martha Washington on the obverse.

=== Historian assessments ===
Since 1982 Siena College Research Institute has periodically conducted surveys asking historians to assess American first ladies according to a cumulative score on the independent criteria of their background, value to the country, intelligence, courage, accomplishments, integrity, leadership, being their own women, public image, and value to the president. Consistently, Washington has been ranked in the upper-half of first ladies by historians in these surveys. In terms of cumulative assessment, Washington has been ranked:

- 9th-best of 42 in 1982
- 12th-best of 37 in 1993
- 13th-best of 38 in 2003
- 9th-best of 38 in 2008
- 9th-best of 39 in 2014
- 10th-best of 40 in 2020

In the 2008 Siena Research Institute survey, Washington was ranked 3rd-highest in the criteria of public image. In the 2014 survey, Washington and her husband were ranked the 2nd-highest out of 39 first couples in terms of being a "power couple".

== See also ==
- Jewels of Martha Washington
- Samuel Osgood House — First Presidential Mansion
- Alexander Macomb House — Second Presidential Mansion
- President's House (Philadelphia) — Third Presidential Mansion
- Dandridge, Tennessee — the only town in the United States named after Martha Dandridge Washington

== Notes ==
Honorary titles
New title	First Lady of the United States; 1789–1797	Succeeded by Abigail Adams
