= Lewis Store =

Historic commercial building in Virginia, United States

- The Lewis Store
- U.S. National Register of Historic Places
- U.S. Historic district – Contributing property
- Virginia Landmarks Register
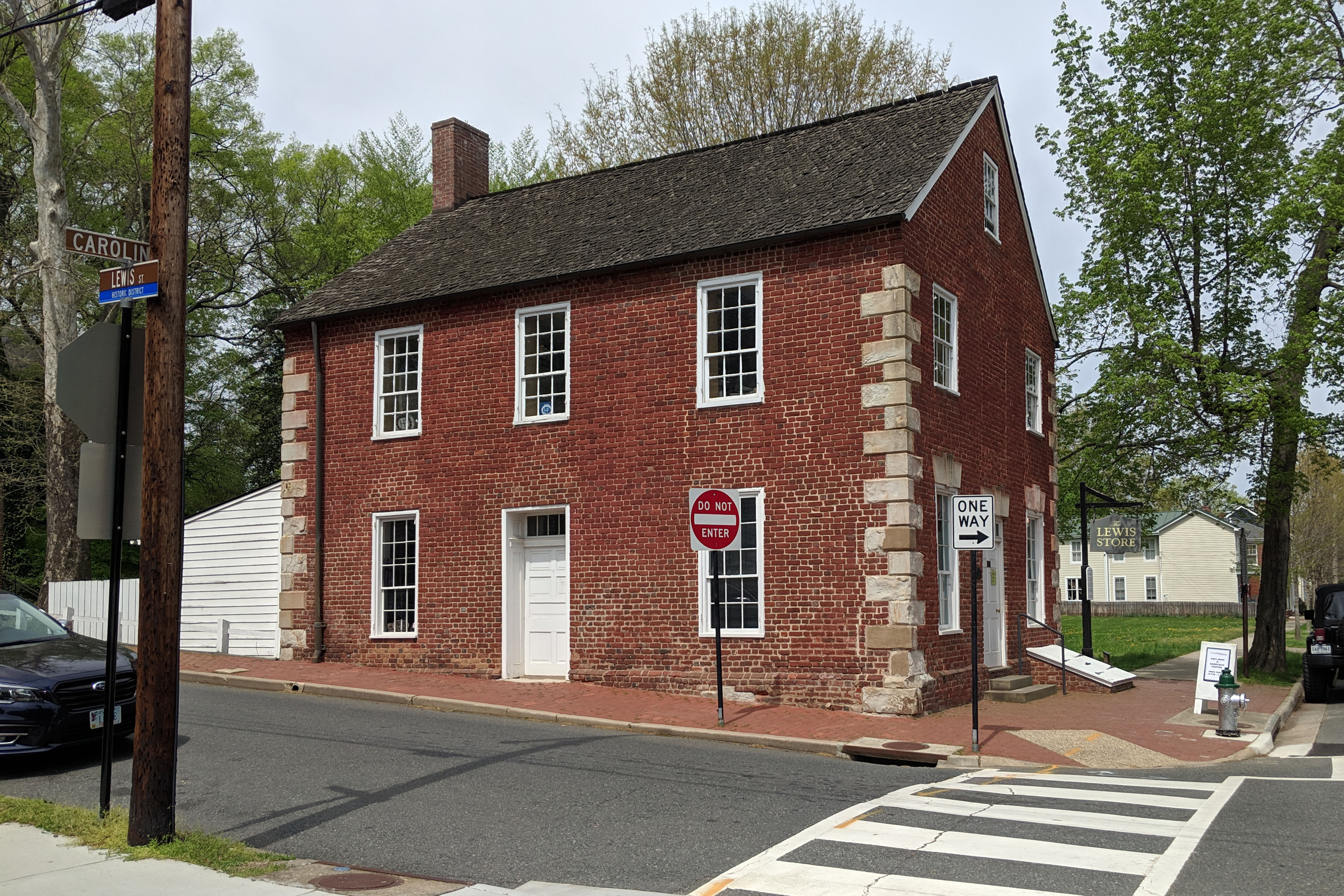
- Lewis Store, April 2019

- Location within Northern Virginia Location within Virginia Location within the United States
- Location: 1200 Caroline St., Fredericksburg, Virginia
- Coordinates: 38°18′20″N 77°27′40″W
- Area: 6.6 acres (2.7 ha)
- Built: 1749, 1808
- Built by: John Lewis
- Architectural style: Georgian
- Part of: Fredericksburg Historic District (ID71001053)
- NRHP reference No.: 12001135
- VLR No.: 111-0132-0033

Significant dates
- Added to NRHP: January 3, 2013
- Designated CP: September 22, 1971
- Designated VLR: September 20, 2012

The Lewis Store, also known as the Fielding Lewis Store, is a historic commercial building located at Fredericksburg, Virginia. It was built in 1749, and is a two-story, front-gable, three-bay Georgian style brick store. The second story addition was built in 1808. The building was rehabilitated between 2000 and 2006. The first story consists of a "sales room" on the front and a "counting room" on the rear. The building functioned as a store until 1823, after which it was used as a residence. It was built by John Lewis and operated by him and his son, Fielding Lewis, who was married to George Washington's sister Elizabeth Washington Lewis. Fielding and Elizabeth Lewis built the nearby Kenmore. The Lewis family sold the store in 1776.

It was listed on the National Register of Historic Places in 2013. It is located in the Fredericksburg Historic District.
