= Washington Avenue Historic District (Fredericksburg, Virginia) =

Historic district in Virginia, United States

- U.S. National Register of Historic Places
- U.S. Historic district
- Virginia Landmarks Register
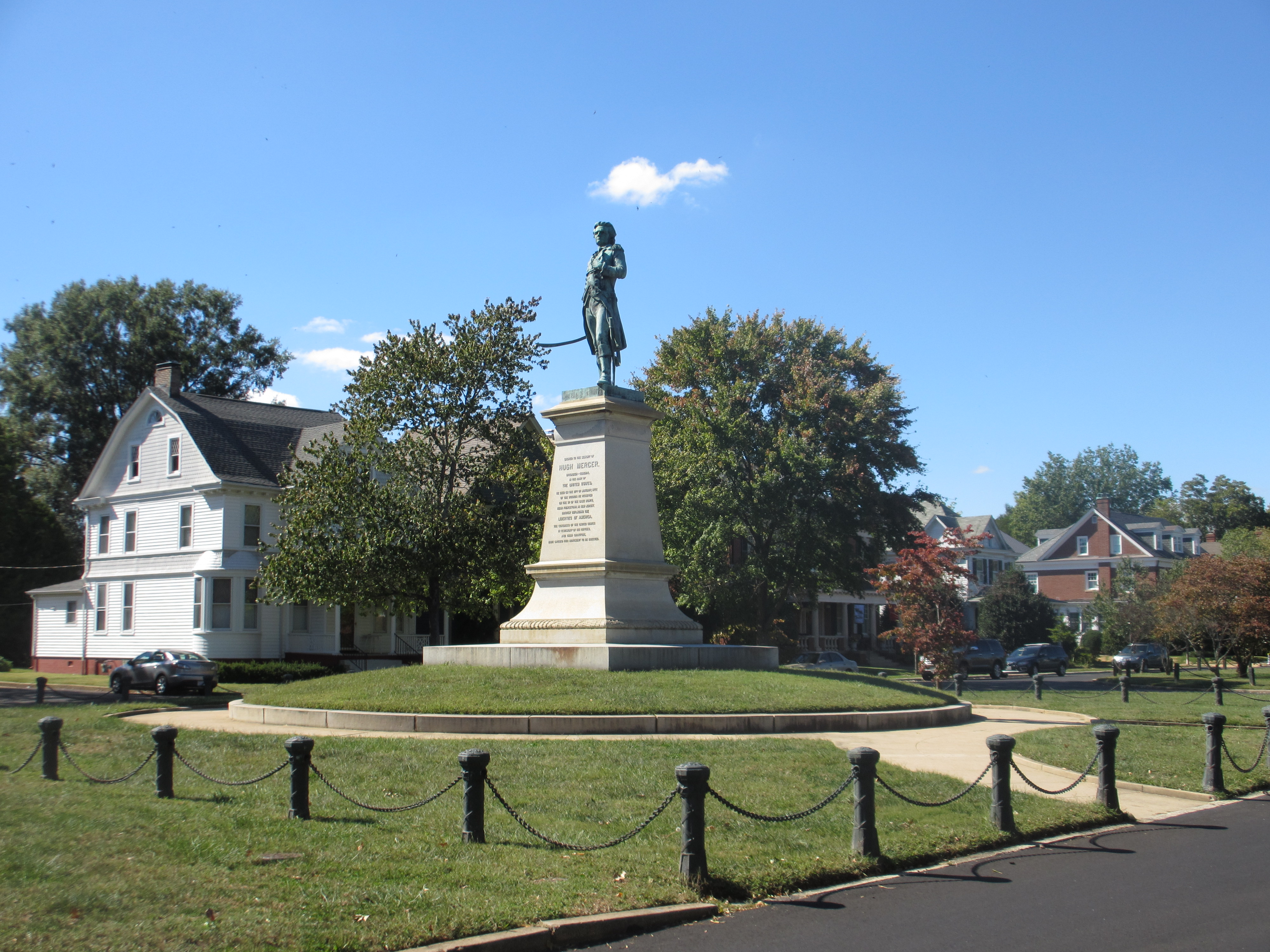
- Hugh Mercer Statue With Houses in Background 1300 Block Washington Avenue Historic District, September 2012

- Location within Northern Virginia Location within Virginia Location within the United States
- Location: 1200-1500 blocks of Washington Ave., and 620 Lewis St., Fredericksburg, Virginia
- Coordinates: 38.3048°N 77.4677°W
- Area: 18 acres (7.3 ha)
- Built: 1775
- Architect: Stern, Philip Nathaniel; et al.
- Architectural style: Late Victorian, Late 19th And 20th Century Revivals
- NRHP reference No.: 02000518
- VLR No.: 111-5262

Significant dates
- Added to NRHP: May 16, 2002
- Designated VLR: December 5, 2001

Washington Avenue Historic District is a national historic district located at Fredericksburg, Virginia. The district includes 36 contributing buildings, 1 contributing site (the Gordon Family Cemetery), and 4 contributing objects in the city of Fredericksburg. It includes substantial, high-style residences that line both the east and the west sides of Washington Avenue reflect the various domestic styles that were popular at the turn of the 20th century. Notable dwellings include the Samuel W. Somerville House (1896-1897), Shepherd House (1910-1911), and Mary Washington Monument Caretaker's Lodge (1896). The four commemorative works are the Mary Washington Monument (1893), General Hugh Mercer Monument (1906) by Edward Virginius Valentine (1838-1930), Jefferson Religious Freedom Monument (1932), and the George Rogers Clark Memorial (1929). Located in the district is the separately listed Kenmore.

It was listed on the National Register of Historic Places in 2002.
