= Carl's Ice Cream =

Historic ice cream stand

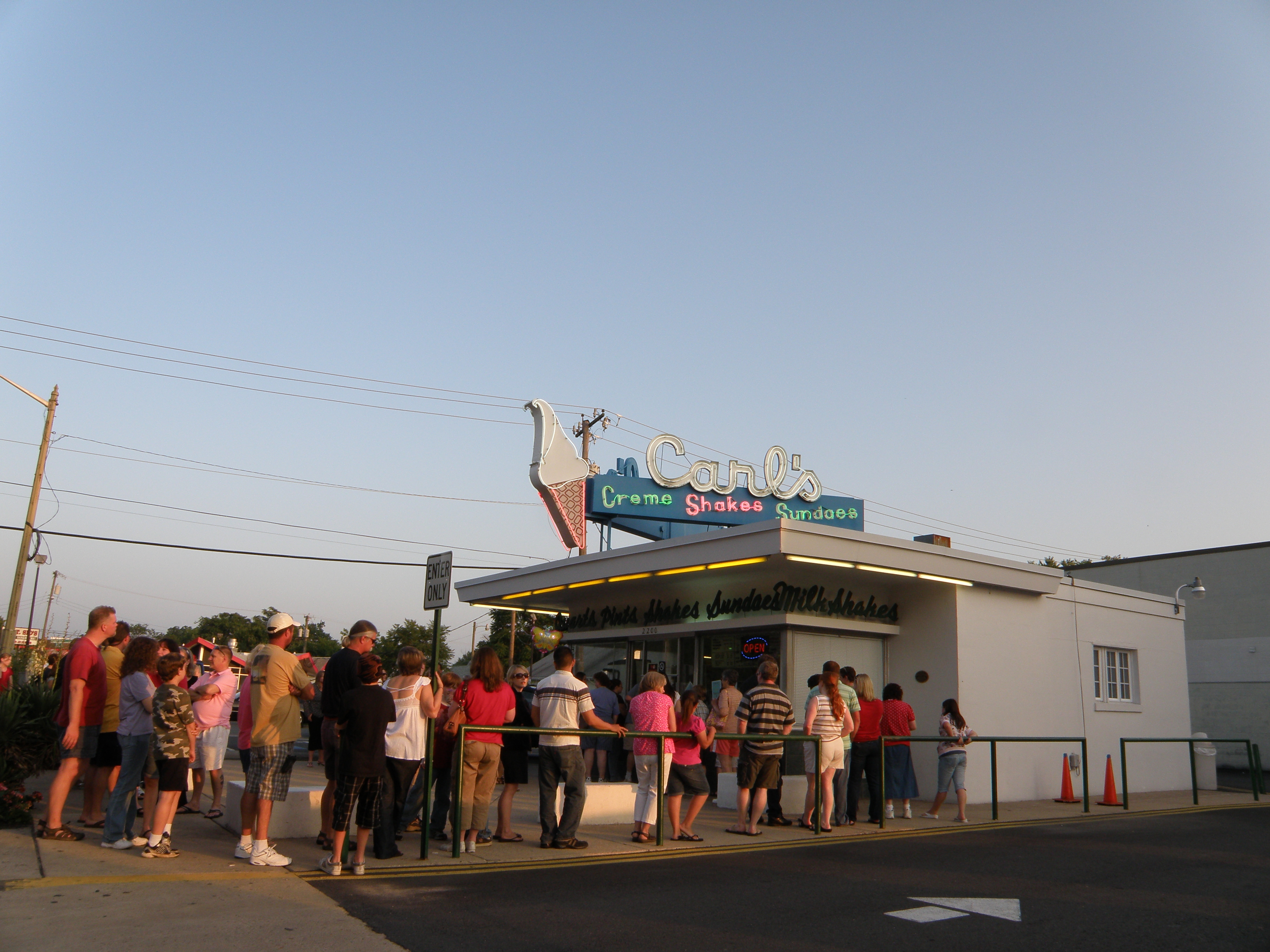
- Interactive map of Carl's Ice Cream

Restaurant information
- Established: 1947; 79 years ago
- Location: 2200 Princess Anne St, Fredericksburg, Virginia, 22401, USA
- Seating capacity: 0 (Walk-up Window)
- Carl's
- U.S. National Register of Historic Places
- Virginia Landmarks Register
- Location within Northern Virginia Location within Virginia Location within the United States
- Location: 2200 Princess Anne St., Fredericksburg, Virginia
- Coordinates: 38°18′49″N 77°28′7″W
- Area: less than one acre
- Built: 1947
- Architect: Skinner, Ashton
- Architectural style: Moderne
- NRHP reference No.: 05000642
- VLR No.: 111-5007

Significant dates
- Added to NRHP: June 30, 2005
- Designated VLR: December 6, 2000

Carl's Ice Cream (also known as "Carl's Frozen Custard" or, most often, "Carl's") is a curbside ice cream stand located at 2200 Princess Anne Street, Fredericksburg, Virginia. Since 2005, the stand, with its Art Moderne architectural facade, has been listed on the National Register of Historic Places.

== History ==
Carl Sponseller founded Carl's Frozen Custard stand in 1947. The original building was registered as a National Landmark and is an official register of Historic Places in 2005. Since 1947, the 1940s, Electro Freeze machines have produced frozen custard daily. Custard differs from ice cream because it contains eggs and sells only three flavors, Vanilla, Chocolate, and Strawberry. When Carl retired, he passed it to his brothers, Paul Sponseller and Herbert Sponseller. When they retired, it was passed to Ramona Sponseller (Settle), Daniel Sponseller, and Cristina Sponseller (McCann), keeping it in the family. The stand has what can only be called a devoted following, so the line of customers often stretches around the building, even in bad weather. Carl's is seasonal, and closed each year from the Sunday before Thanksgiving until the Friday of Presidents Day Weekend.

== See also ==
- National Register of Historic Places listings in Virginia
