= Elizabeth Washington Lewis =

American Colonist, sister of George Washington (1733–1797)

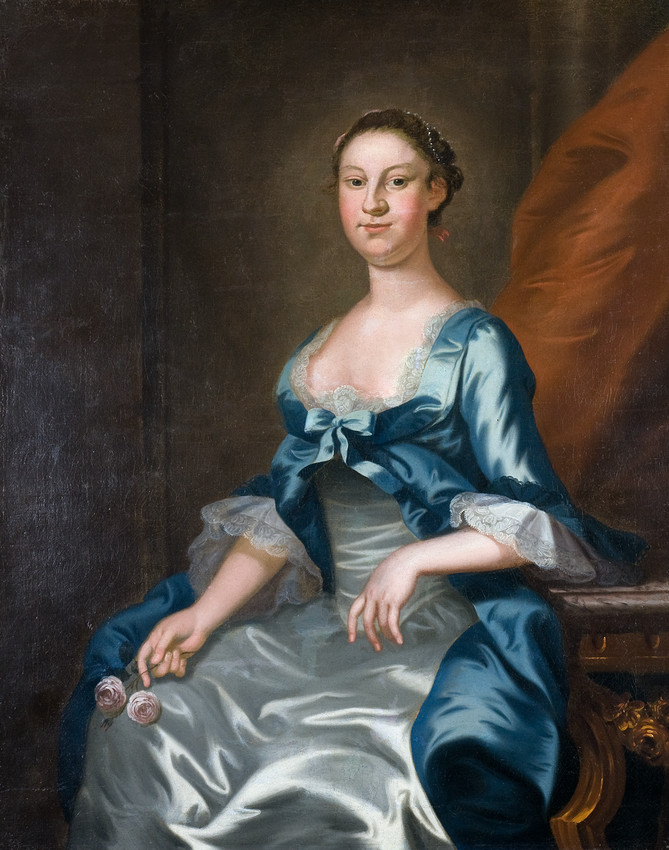
- Portrait c. 1750
- Born: Elizabeth Washington; June 20, 1733; Popes Creek, Colony of Virginia, British America
- Died: March 31, 1797 (aged 63); Culpeper, Virginia, U.S.
- Spouse: Fielding Lewis (m. 1750; died 1781)
- Children: 11, including Lawrence
- Parent(s): Augustine Washington; Mary Ball Washington
- Family: Washington family Eleanor Park Custis (daughter-in-law); Princess Catherine Murat (great-granddaughter); Esther Maria Lewis Chapin (great-great-granddaughter)

Elizabeth Washington Lewis (June 20, 1733 – March 31, 1797) was the younger sister of George Washington and the only one of his three sisters that survived childhood.

== Early life ==
She was born in Popes Creek in Westmoreland County, Colony of Virginia, the first daughter of Augustine Washington and Mary Ball Washington. She was known as "Betty" within the family. Washington spent her earliest years at the family's plantation on the Upper Potomac.

At age seven, the Washington family moved to Ferry Farm close to Fredericksburg, Virginia in search for better economic prospects. There, Washington enjoyed a carefree childhood and was possibly instructed in horse-riding.

Elizabeth attended school at the same time as her brother George with whom she kept close relations throughout her life. After the death of her father in 1743, she was instructed in domestic arts by her mother and later sent to Fredericksburg for further education, where she was reunited with George and her four brothers. After George permanently left Ferry Farm to live with their half-brother Lawrence Washington at Mount Vernon, Washington took on most of the household tasks.

== Married life ==
In 1750, Elizabeth got to spend significant time with her cousin Fielding Lewis. The 25-year-old Lewis, who had visited Ferry Farm occasionally, sought comfort in Elizabeth's presence after his first wife, Catharine Washington died in childbirth the same year. This relationship grew stronger and with mutual attraction on either side, Washington's mother Mary gave her consent. The wedding was held on the Farm, May 7, 1750.

Fielding and Elizabeth had 11 children together, of whom seven survived into adulthood:

- Fielding Lewis, II (1751 – 1803); married Anne Alexander, had issue; married Nancy Alexander, had issue.
- Augustine Lewis (January 22, 1752 – 1756); died as a child.
- Warner Lewis (June 24, 1755 – 1756); died in infancy.
- George Washington Lewis (March 14, 1757 – November 15, 1831); married Catherine Daingerfield, had issue.
- Mary Lewis (April 22, 1759 – December 25, 1759); died in infancy.
- Charles Lewis (October 3, 1760 – November 6, 1775); died unmarried.
- Samuel Lewis (May 14, 1762 – December 31, 1764); died as a child.
- Elizabeth Lewis (February 23, 1765 – August 9, 1830); married distant cousin Charles Carter, had issue.
- Lawrence Lewis (March 4, 1767 – November 20, 1839); married Eleanor Parke Custis, George Washington's step-granddaughter, had issue.
- Robert Lewis (June 25, 1769 – January 17, 1829); married cousin Judith Carter Browne, had issue.
- Howell Lewis (December 12, 1771 – December 26, 1822); married Ellen Hackley Pollard, had issue.

After their marriage, Fielding Lewis bought 861 acres of land close to Fredericksburg. The property was 1270 acres including inherited land. Soon construction of Millbrook House (renamed "Kenmore House" in 1794) ensued. The Lewises would spend most of their lives, frequently visited by George Washington who maintained close connections to his family. The growing involvement of Fielding in the Revolution not only strained the estate's budget but also left Betty Washington Lewis mostly in charge of the household and the property.

She was widowed when Fielding Lewis died on December 7, 1781, aged fifty-six. Elizabeth outlived her husband by 16 years, dying in 1797.

== Later life ==
After her husband died, Lewis' tasks were widely expanded. Apart from managing Kenmore and her husband's businesses, ownership of the Lewis Store was also passed on to her. After the revolution and Fielding Lewis' death, Betty Washington alone was in charge of running Kenmore estate which was heavily mortgaged in order to finance Fielding Lewis' engagement in the Revolution. The debts were paid off by selling the land surrounding the estate and Betty's efforts in running a small boarding School.

After 14 years of running the estate, Lewis moved to live with her daughter Betty Carter at Western View in Culpeper County, Virginia. She died on March 31, 1797, aged 63.

Shortly after her death, her stepson John inherited the Kenmore estate, and would sell it off.

== Ancestry ==
Ancestors of Betty Washington Lewis

16. Lawrence Washington
8. John Washington
17. Amphyllis Twigden
4. Lawrence Washington
18. Nathaniel Pope
9. Anne Pope
19. Lucy (Luce) Fox
2. Augustine Washington
20. Augustine Warner
10. Augustine Warner Jr.
21. Mary Towneley
5. Mildred Warner
22. George Reade
11. Mildred Read
23. Elizabeth Martian (Martiau)
1. Betty Washington Lewis
24. William Ball
12. William Ball
25. Dorothy Tuttle
6. Joseph Ball
26. Thomas Atherold
13. Hannah Atherold
27. Mary Harvey
3. Mary Ball
28. Peter Montague
14. Peter Montague
29. Cicely Matthews
7. Mary Montague
30. Meindert Doodes
15. Mary Doodes
31. Mary Garrett (or Geret)
