= James Monroe High School (Virginia) =

Coordinates: 38°18′40.4″N 77°28′30.5″W

- 2300 Washington Avenue; Fredericksburg, VA

Information
- Type: Public
- Established: 1920
- School district: Fredericksburg City Public Schools
- Principal: Marcus Petty
- Grades: 9-12
- Enrollment: 1,023 (2016-17)
- Colors: Orange and Black
- Mascot: Yellow Jacket
- Website: James Monroe High School Website

James Monroe High School is located in Fredericksburg, Virginia. It is a four-year public high school in the Fredericksburg City Schools system. The school is named after James Monroe. The current school building opened to students in September 2006. James Monroe High School is part of the VHSL AA Battlefield District.

The Virginia Department of Education fully accredits James Monroe High School.

== History ==
Opened in 1920, the building now known as Maury School was Fredericksburg's first real high school. It was originally called Fredericksburg High School, but in 1939, this name was changed to honor the nation's fifth president, James Monroe, who had his law office in the city from 1786-89.

The second James Monroe High School building was constructed in 1952, and a wing was added in 1959. From 1981-83, a large renovation project modernized the entire building, and another wing was added. The Arthur H. Schwartz Memorial Athletic Complex was constructed during 1985-86, providing a new track, tennis courts, and a baseball field.

Up until 2005, Fredericksburg City Public Schools used an unusual system of grade levels and schools. James Monroe High School carried 8th through 12th grades. However, the construction of a new upper elementary school in the school district in 2005 allowed for the system to become standardized. The class of 2009 was the last eighth grade class of James Monroe High School.

Demolition of the old JM high school building, August 2006

The second high school was demolished in June through August 2006. The new replacement high school began construction in June 2004. It opened August 2006, and is built in the back of the second high school. The Class of 2010 was the first graduating class to go through all four years at the third JMHS.

== VHSL State Championships ==
- 2019 Field Hockey
- 2018 Field Hockey
- 2017 Field Hockey
- 2010 Boys' Golf
- 2009 Academic Quiz Team
- 2008 Football
- 2005 Academic Quiz Team
- 2003 Boys' tennis
- 2002 Boys' tennis
- 1996 Football
- 1990 Boys' tennis
- 1987 Football
- 1986 Football
- 1972 Boys' Basketball
- 1969 Boys' Basketball
- 1963 Boys' Basketball
- 1959 Boys' Track

== Notable alumni ==
- George Coghill, retired defensive back for the Denver Broncos, Member of Wake Forest Hall of Fame
- Randy Heflin, pitcher for the Boston Red Sox from 1945-1946
- Herb Hash, pitcher for the Boston Red Sox in 1940 and 1941
- Gerry Kissell, Comic book artist, creator of Code Word: Geronimo for IDW Publishing (class of 1982)
- Judge Reinhold, actor in Beverly Hills Cop, The Santa Clause, Fast Times at Ridgemont High & other films
- Jack Rose, guitarist
- Maurice B. Rowe III (1922–2014), Virginia Secretary of Commerce and Resources
- Keller Williams, one man jam band (class of 1988)
