= Fredericksburg City Public Schools =

School district in Virginia, United States

Fredericksburg City Public Schools is a school division serving students that live in Fredericksburg, Virginia

== Administration ==
=== Superintendent ===
The current Superintendent of Fredericksburg City Public Schools is Dr. Marceline Catlett. Before being appointed as superintendent, Dr. Catlett served as the Director of Curriculum and Instruction, Assistant Superintendent for Instruction and Personnel, and Deputy Superintendent of Fredericksburg City Public Schools in before being appointed superintendent in 2020.

=== School Board Members ===
- Jennifer Boyd (Chair)
- Jarvis Bailey
- Jannan Holmes
- Malvina Kay
- Kathleen Pomeroy
- Matt Rowe

== Schools ==
Fredericksburg City Public Schools currently has five schools; an early childhood learning center, two elementary schools, a middle school, and a high school.

=== Elementary Schools and Early Childhood Learning Centers ===
- Walker-Grant Early Childhood Learning Center
- Hugh Mercer Elementary School
- Lafayette Elementary School
- A third elementary school is scheduled to open in fall 2024.

=== Middle school ===
- Walker-Grant Middle School
- A new middle school to replace the current Walker-Grant Middle School is scheduled to open in fall 2024.

=== High school ===
- James Monroe High School
