= Fredericksburg, Virginia =

- Independent city
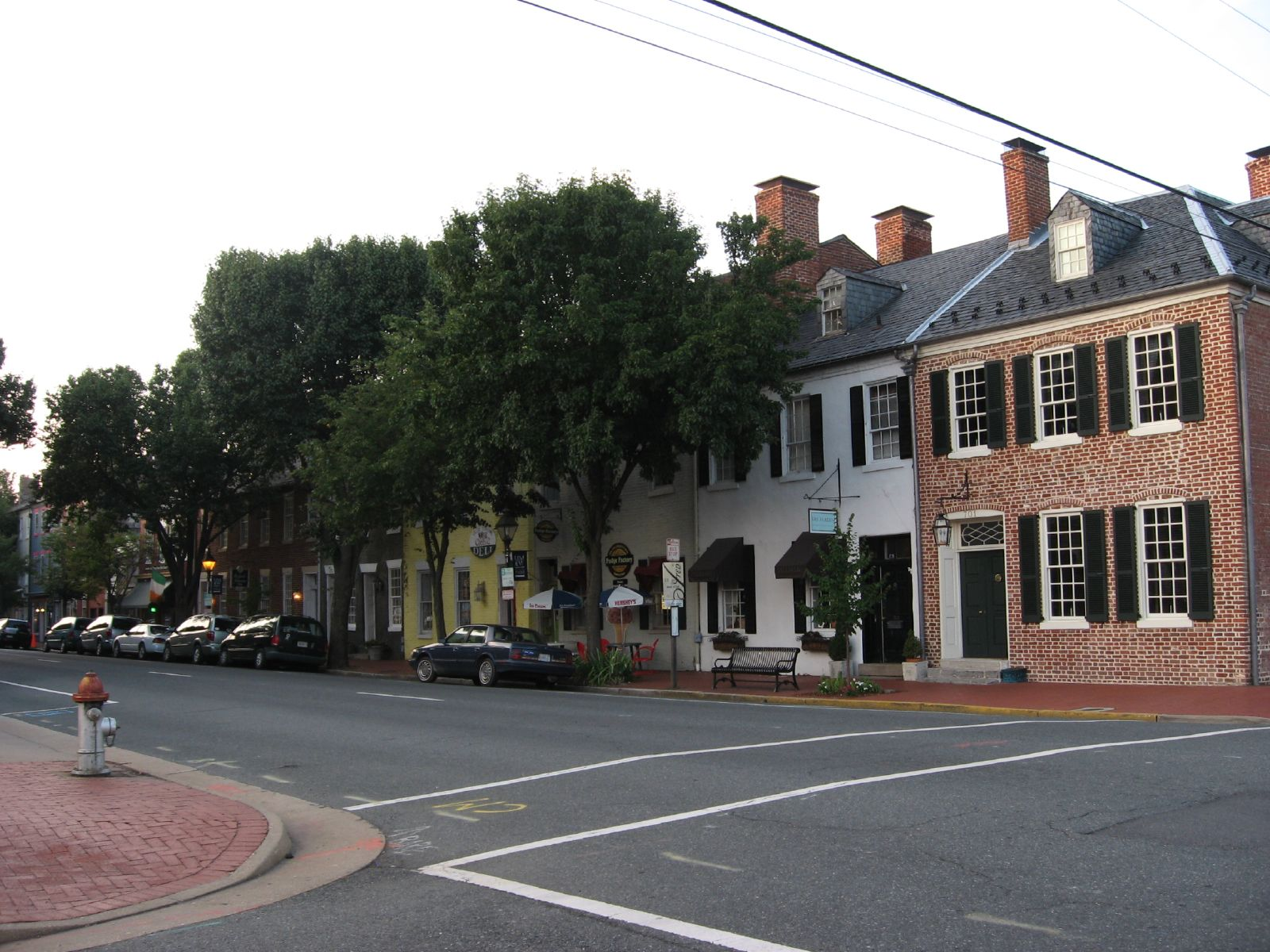
- Historic Downtown Fredericksburg

- Flag Seal Coat of arms
- Motto: America's Most Historic City
- Interactive map of Fredericksburg, Virginia
- Location within Northern Virginia Location within Virginia Location within the United States
- Coordinates: 38°18′6.5″N 77°28′15″W
- Country: United States
- State: Virginia
- County: None (Independent city since 1879, adjacent to Spotsylvania County)
- Founded: 1728; 298 years ago
- Incorporated: 1781; 245 years ago
- Named for: Frederick, Prince of Wales

Government
  - Mayor: Kerry P. Devine

Area
  - Independent city: 10.52 sq mi (27.24 km^{2})
  - Land: 10.45 sq mi (27.07 km^{2})
  - Water: 0.069 sq mi (0.18 km^{2})
- Elevation: 59 ft (18 m)

Population (2020)
  - Independent city: 27,982
  - Estimate (2025): 30,393 ▲
  - Density: 2,677/sq mi (1,034/km^{2})
  - Urban: 167,679 (US: 216th)
- Time zone: UTC−05:00 (Eastern (EST))
  - Summer (DST): UTC−04:00 (EDT)
- ZIP Codes: 22401 (USPS designates 5 zip codes for Fredericksburg, but 4 of them lie outside the Independent City in surrounding counties; only 22401 lies inside it)
- Area code(s): 540, 571, 703
- FIPS code: 51-29744
- GNIS feature ID: 1494947
- Website: www.fredericksburgva.gov
- * Independent from Spotsylvania County in 1879

Fredericksburg is an independent city in Virginia, United States. The population was 27,982 at the 2020 census. It is part of the Washington metropolitan area. The Bureau of Economic Analysis combines the city with neighboring Spotsylvania County for statistical purposes.

Located near where the Rappahannock River crosses the Atlantic Seaboard fall line, Fredericksburg was a prominent port in Virginia during the colonial era. It was halfway between the capitals of the opposing forces during the American Civil War, and was the site of the Battle of Fredericksburg and Second Battle of Fredericksburg. These battles are preserved, in part, as the Fredericksburg and Spotsylvania National Military Park. More than 10,000 African Americans in the region left slavery for freedom in 1862 alone, getting behind Union lines. Tourism is a major part of the economy. Approximately 1.5 million people visit the Fredericksburg area annually, including the battlefield park, the downtown visitor center, events, museums, art shops, galleries, and many historical sites.

Fredericksburg is home to Central Park. The Spotsylvania Towne Centre is located in Spotsylvania County, adjacent to the city. Major employers include the University of Mary Washington (named for the mother of George Washington, who lived here), Mary Washington Healthcare, and GEICO. Many Fredericksburg area residents commute to work by car, bus, and rail to Washington and Richmond, as well as Fairfax, Prince William, and Arlington counties.

== Etymology ==
The independent city of Fredericksburg was named in 1728 for Frederick, Prince of Wales, the eldest son of King George II. The designation coincided with the Virginia General Assembly's effort to establish a formal trading center at the fall line of the Rappahannock River a transitional zone where the river ceased to be navigable for larger vessels. Prior to English colonization, the area was inhabited by Algonquian-speaking tribes affiliated with the Powhatan Confederacy and later became a frontier for inland expansion from the Tidewater region. The selection of the site reflected practical logistics. Positioned at the head of navigation, Fredericksburg developed into a port town for exporting tobacco and receiving manufactured goods. Its function was tied to the movement of agricultural products rather than urban planning or centralized governance. The presence of large landholdings nearby, such as Ferry Farm purchased in 1738 by Augustine Washington aligned with the town's role as a local hub. During the colonial period, the town played a vital role in Virginia's economy and political life. It was home to many prominent families, including the Washingtons at George Washington's boyhood home, Ferry Farm Historic Site which lies just across the river from the city of Fredericksburg. Fredericksburg was incorporated as a town in 1781 and became an independent city in 1879, a legal status retained under Virginia's city-county separation framework. The city witnessed significant destruction during the American Civil War, particularly during the Battle of Fredericksburg in 1862, which caused long-term disruption to its infrastructure and population.

== History ==
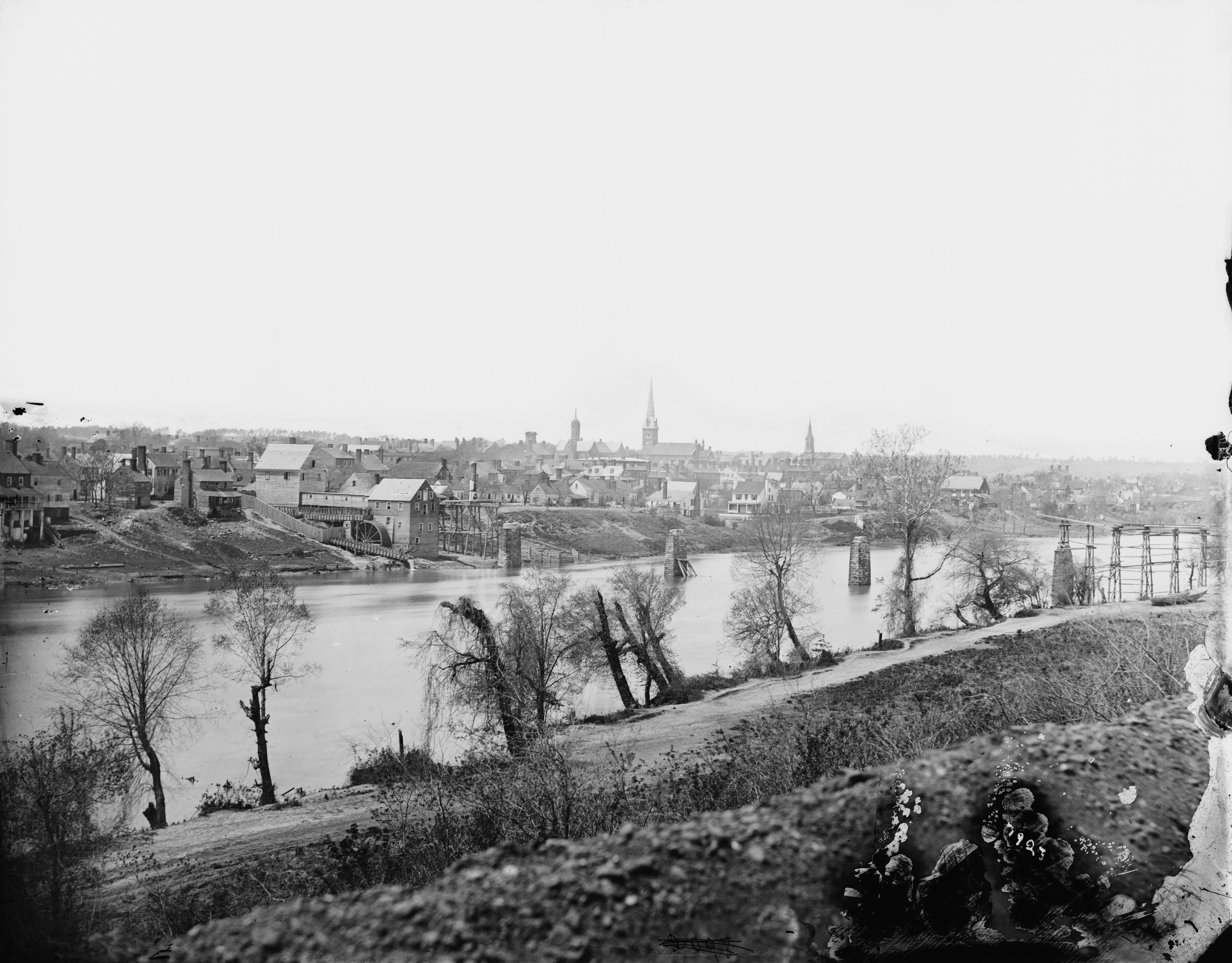
Fredericksburg, Virginia, March 1863. View from across the Rappahannock River. To the right is the steeple of Fredericksburg Baptist Church, and toward the center is the tower of St. George's Church. To the left are two mill buildings in the manufacturing district.

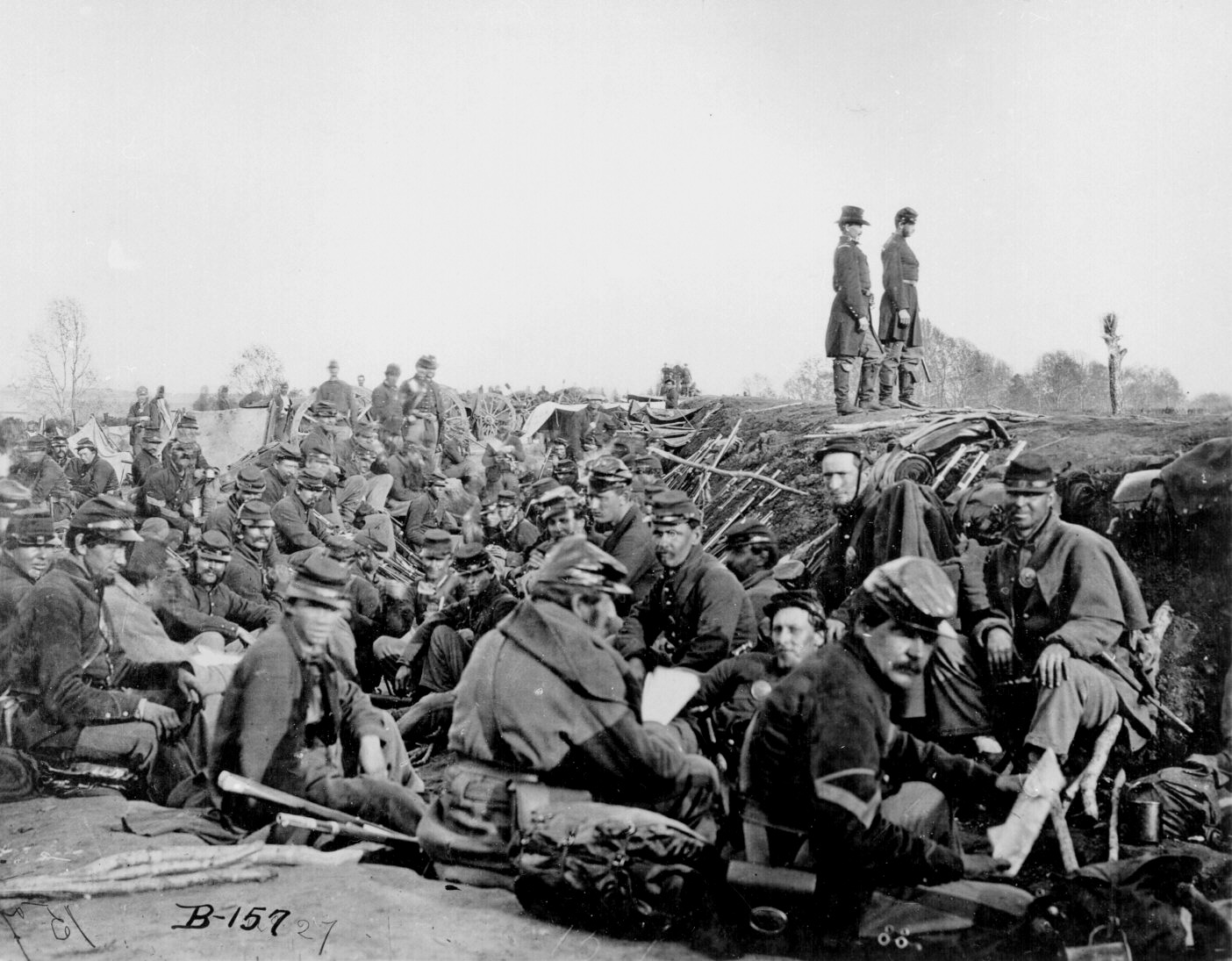
Union army soldiers of Army of the Potomac's VI Corps in trenches before storming Marye's Heights at the Second Battle of Fredericksburg during the Chancellorsville campaign, May 1863

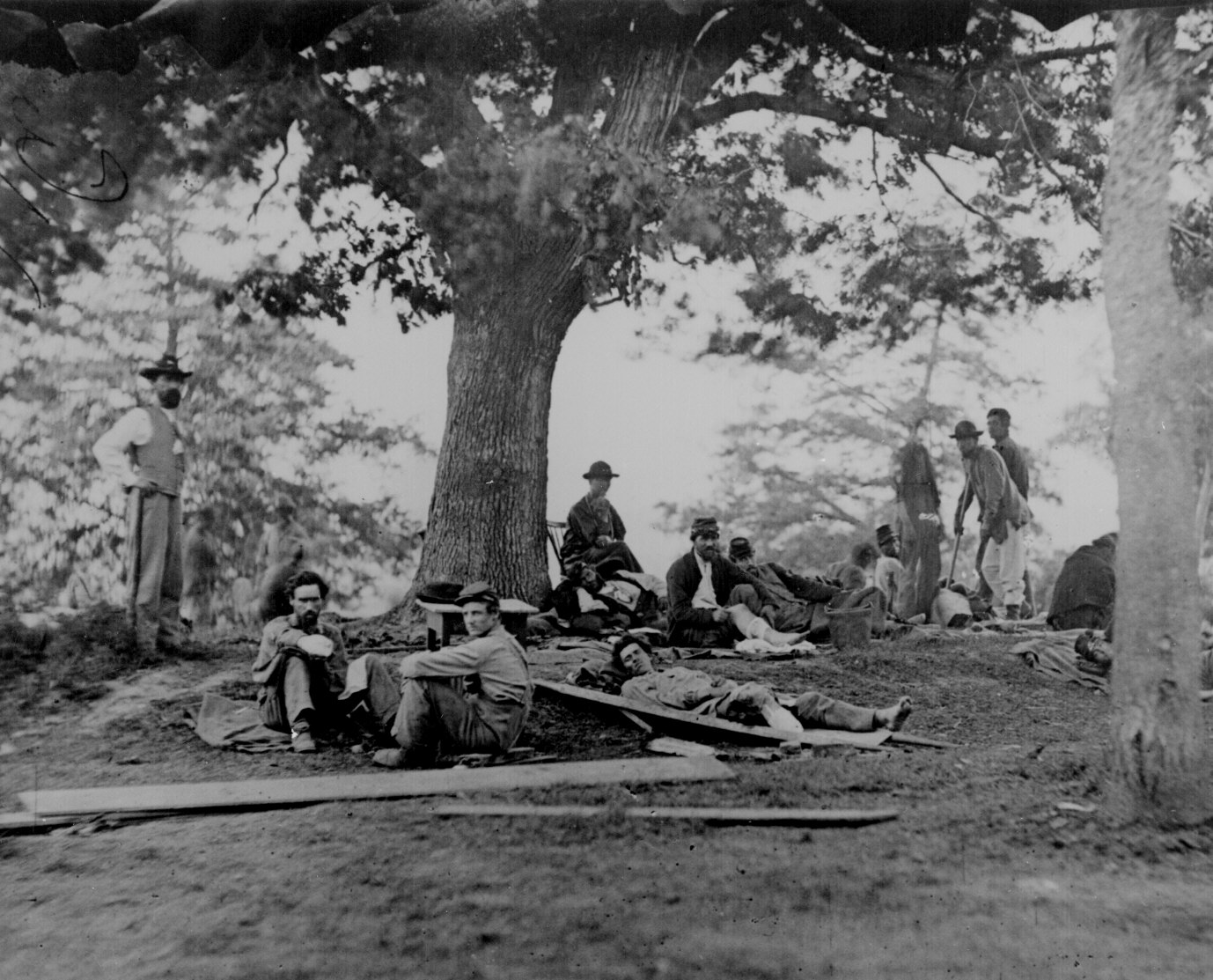
Wounded soldiers being tended at Marye's House in Fredericksburg in May 1864 after the Battle of Spotsylvania, May 19, 1864

At the time of European encounter, the indigenous inhabitants of the area that became Fredericksburg were a Siouan-speaking tribe called the Manahoac. English colonists recorded the name of the Manahoac village there as Mahaskahod. Siouan tribes occupied much of the area of the Piedmont. The Tidewater areas of the coastal plain had primarily Algonquian-speaking tribes making up the Powhatan Confederacy.

=== Colonial ===
Fredericksburg developed as the frontier of colonial Virginia shifted west from the coastal plain into the Piedmont. The land on which the city was founded was part of a tract patented in 1671. The Virginia General Assembly established a fort on the Rappahannock in 1676, just downriver of the present-day city. In 1714, Lieutenant Governor Alexander Spotswood sponsored a German settlement called Germanna on the Rapidan River, a tributary of the Rappahannock upstream from the future site of the city. In 1716, he led an exploratory expedition westward over the Blue Ridge Mountains.

As interest in the frontier grew, the colonial assembly formed Spotsylvania County in 1720, named after Royal Lieutenant Governor Alexander Spotswood. In 1728, Fredericksburg was declared a port for the county, of which it was then a part. Streets within the town were named after relatives of Frederick, Prince of Wales, who was the town's namesake., The county court was moved to Fredericksburg in 1732. Hence, the community served as county seat until 1780. The court was then moved to Spotsylvania Courthouse, Virginia – closer to the geographical center of Spotsylvania County. This led to Fredericksburg becoming incorporated with its own court, council, and mayor. It received its charter as an independent city in 1879 and under Virginia law, was separated from Spotsylvania County. The city adopted its present city manager/council form of government in 1911.

The city has close associations with George Washington, whose family in 1738 moved to Ferry Farm in Stafford County near the Rappahannock River opposite Fredericksburg. Washington's mother, Mary, later moved to the city, and his sister Betty lived at Kenmore, a plantation house then outside the city. Several citizens played active roles during the American Revolution (1763–1781). For example, a number of locals signed the Leedstown Resolves, which formed an association to protest the Stamp Act in the 1760s. In the 1770s, Fielding Lewis, owner of Kenmore Plantation and brother-in-law to George Washington, also operated an arms factory for the Continental Army. Other significant early residents include the Revolutionary War generals Hugh Mercer and George Weedon, naval war hero John Paul Jones, and future U.S. president James Monroe. Thomas Jefferson wrote the Virginia Statute for Religious Freedom in Fredericksburg.

=== 19th century ===
During the 19th century, mills continued to be developed along the Rappahannock River, which provided water power. There were mills for grinding flour, processing and weaving cotton, and other manufacturing. Fredericksburg sought to maintain its sphere of trade, but with limited success. It promoted the development of a canal on the Rappahannock and construction of a turnpike and plank road to bind the interior country to the market town. By 1837, a north–south railroad, which became the Richmond, Fredericksburg and Potomac Railroad, linked the town to Richmond, the state capital. A much-needed railroad joining the town to the West's farming region was not finished until after the Civil War.

During the Civil War, Fredericksburg was strategically important because of its port location midway between Washington and Richmond, the opposing capitals of the Union and the Confederacy. During the Battle of Fredericksburg from December 11–15, 1862, the town sustained significant damage from bombardment and looting by the Union forces.

During that engagement, nearly 10,000 enslaved people left area plantations and city households to gain freedom by crossing the Rappahannock River to Stafford County and join the Union lines, part of a movement by enslaved people throughout the South in wartime. John Washington, a literate enslaved person who shortly crossed to freedom, wrote later about people watching the approach of Union troops across the river from Fredericksburg: "No one could be seen on the street but the colored people. and every one of them seemed to be in the best of humors."

The Second Battle of Fredericksburg was fought in and around the town on May 3, 1863, in connection with the Chancellorsville campaign (April 27, 1863 – May 6, 1863). The battles of the Wilderness and Spotsylvania Court House were fought nearby in May 1864. The Washington Woolen Mill, a large three-story building, was converted to use as a hospital during the war.

After the war, Fredericksburg recovered its former position as a center of local trade and slowly grew beyond its prewar boundaries. Neither the city of Fredericksburg nor the surrounding counties reached the 1860 level of population again until well into the 20th century. After the war, many freedmen moved to Richmond and Petersburg, where there had been established free black communities before the war, and there was more work.

=== 20th century to present ===
In the early 20th century, as the Jim Crow era continued in the South, there was widespread population movement. Many African-Americans left rural areas of the South for work and other opportunities in industrial cities of the North and Midwest in the Great Migration. Some settled in Washington, D.C., where there were more opportunities, or further north.

War-related buildup at defense facilities for World War II added to the area's population in the 1940s. The 1960s brought renewed growth and development, fueled by the construction of Interstate 95, which eased commuting and trade. By the 1970s, the city and the area had become a bedroom community for jobs in Northern Virginia and Washington, D.C. Headquarters agencies, lobbyists, consultants, defense and government contractors, and a range of other businesses were part of the regional economy influenced by the U.S. government. The city also benefited from its relative proximity to four military installations: the United States Marine Corps' Quantico Base, the U.S. Army's Fort Belvoir, the U.S. Navy's Dahlgren Surface Weapons Base, and the Virginia National Guard's Fort A.P. Hill.

The University of Mary Washington was founded in Fredericksburg in 1908 as the State Normal and Industrial School for Women, to train white women for teaching K-12 and industrial skills. Adopting the name of Mary Washington College in 1938, the college was for many years associated with the University of Virginia (then limited to white men) as a women's liberal arts college. The college officially desegregated in 1964. The college became independent of the University of Virginia and began to accept men in 1970. In 2004, the college changed its name from Mary Washington College to the University of Mary Washington. Two additional campuses for graduate and professional studies, education, and research are located in Stafford County and in King George County, respectively.

Musician Link Wray invented the power chord of modern rock guitar in Fredericksburg in 1958 during an improvisation of the instrumental piece "Rumble", a single subsequently released by Wray & His Ray Men. This innovation became widely used by rock guitarists. In the early 21st century, the local music scene includes a wide variety of genres.

A commuter rail line – the Virginia Railway Express – was established in the 1980s, providing passage to Washington, D.C. and other cities north of Fredericksburg.

The city has become the regional healthcare center for the area. Retail, real estate, and other commercial growth exploded in the early 21st century, eventually slowing during the Great Recession beginning in 2007. Hispanic growth skyrocketed from 2011 to 2020, with Chancellor Green in nearby Spotsylvania County becoming a local enclave.

== Geography and climate ==

According to the U.S. Census Bureau, the city has a total area of 10.5 square miles (27.2 km^{2}), 10.4 square miles (27.0 km^{2}) of which is land and 0.1 square miles (0.2 km^{2}), or 0.67%, of which is water. The city is part of the boundary between the Piedmont and Tidewater regions, and as such is located on the fall line, as evident on the Rappahannock River. US 1, US 17, and I-95 all pass through the city, which is located 53 miles (85 km) south of downtown Washington, D.C.

The city is bounded on the north and east by the Rappahannock River; across the river is Stafford County. The city is bounded on the south and west by Spotsylvania County.

Fredericksburg has a four-season humid subtropical climate (Köppen Cfa), with cool winters and hot, humid summers. Daytime temperatures for much of the year average slightly higher than in Washington, D.C. due to the southerly aspect, although the inland location and distance from the urban heat island present in the nation's capital make for significantly cooler low temperatures.

Climate data for Fredericksburg, Virginia (downtown, 1991−2020 normals, extremes 1995–present)
Month	Jan	Feb	Mar	Apr	May	Jun	Jul	Aug	Sep	Oct	Nov	Dec	Year
Record high °F (°C)	82 (28)	80 (27)	90 (32)	95 (35)	96 (36)	102 (39)	102 (39)	103 (39)	98 (37)	96 (36)	83 (28)	80 (27)	103 (39)
Mean daily maximum °F (°C)	45.9 (7.7)	49.3 (9.6)	57.0 (13.9)	68.5 (20.3)	76.1 (24.5)	84.3 (29.1)	88.5 (31.4)	86.6 (30.3)	80.3 (26.8)	70.0 (21.1)	58.9 (14.9)	50.0 (10.0)	67.9 (19.9)
Daily mean °F (°C)	35.5 (1.9)	38.1 (3.4)	45.3 (7.4)	56.1 (13.4)	64.6 (18.1)	73.6 (23.1)	78.1 (25.6)	76.3 (24.6)	69.6 (20.9)	58.1 (14.5)	47.1 (8.4)	39.2 (4.0)	56.8 (13.8)
Mean daily minimum °F (°C)	25.1 (−3.8)	26.9 (−2.8)	33.5 (0.8)	43.6 (6.4)	53.2 (11.8)	62.9 (17.2)	67.6 (19.8)	65.9 (18.8)	58.9 (14.9)	46.2 (7.9)	35.2 (1.8)	28.3 (−2.1)	45.6 (7.6)
Record low °F (°C)	−4 (−20)	−8 (−22)	5 (−15)	20 (−7)	32 (0)	45 (7)	53 (12)	51 (11)	42 (6)	28 (−2)	17 (−8)	7 (−14)	−8 (−22)
Average precipitation inches (mm)	2.72 (69)	2.50 (64)	3.96 (101)	3.37 (86)	4.19 (106)	3.88 (99)	4.82 (122)	2.99 (76)	4.54 (115)	3.72 (94)	3.52 (89)	3.19 (81)	43.40 (1,102)
Average snowfall inches (cm)	3.7 (9.4)	5.2 (13)	0.1 (0.25)	0.0 (0.0)	0.0 (0.0)	0.0 (0.0)	0.0 (0.0)	0.0 (0.0)	0.0 (0.0)	0.0 (0.0)	0.0 (0.0)	2.3 (5.8)	11.3 (29)
Average precipitation days (≥ 0.01 in)	9.2	7.2	9.4	9.7	12.8	10.5	9.8	9.7	8.3	8.9	8.5	9.0	113.0
Average snowy days (≥ 0.1 in)	1.4	1.1	0.3	0.0	0.0	0.0	0.0	0.0	0.0	0.0	0.0	0.5	3.3
Source: NOAA

== Demographics ==
Historical population
Census	Pop.	Note	%±
1790	1,485		—
1800	2,808		89.1%
1810	2,509		−10.6%
1820	3,498		39.4%
1830	3,308		−5.4%
1840	3,974		20.1%
1850	4,061		2.2%
1860	5,022		23.7%
1870	4,046		−19.4%
1880	5,010		23.8%
1890	4,528		−9.6%
1900	5,068		11.9%
1910	5,874		15.9%
1920	5,882		0.1%
1930	6,819		15.9%
1940	10,066		47.6%
1950	12,158		20.8%
1960	13,639		12.2%
1970	14,450		5.9%
1980	15,322		6.0%
1990	19,027		24.2%
2000	19,279		1.3%
2010	24,286		26.0%
2020	27,982		15.2%
2025 (est.)	30,393	▲	8.6%
U.S. Decennial Census; 1790–1960 1900–1990; 1990–2000 2010–2020

=== Racial and ethnic composition ===
Fredericksburg city, Virginia – Racial and ethnic composition Note: the US Census treats Hispanic/Latino as an ethnic category. This table excludes Latinos from the racial categories and assigns them to a separate category. Hispanics/Latinos may be of any race.
Race / Ethnicity (NH = Non-Hispanic)	Pop 1980	Pop 1990	Pop 2000	Pop 2010	Pop 2020	% 1980	% 1990	% 2000	% 2010	% 2020
White alone (NH)	12,009	14,245	13,759	14,760	15,201	78.38%	74.87%	71.37%	60.78%	54.32%
Black or African American alone (NH)	3,075	4,081	3,884	5,367	5,956	20.07%	21.45%	20.15%	22.10%	21.29%
Native American or Alaska Native alone (NH)	30	27	58	58	86	0.20%	0.14%	0.30%	0.24%	0.31%
Asian alone (NH)	57	200	277	670	1,325	0.37%	1.05%	1.44%	2.76%	4.74%
Native Hawaiian or Pacific Islander alone (NH)	x	x	10	16	24	x	x	0.05%	0.07%	0.09%
Other race alone (NH)	23	11	37	64	280	0.15%	0.06%	0.19%	0.26%	1.00%
Mixed race or Multiracial (NH)	x	x	309	744	1,638	x	x	1.60%	3.06%	5.85%
Hispanic or Latino (any race)	128	463	945	2,607	3,472	0.84%	2.43%	4.90%	10.73%	12.41%
Total	15,322	19,027	19,279	24,286	27,982	100.00%	100.00%	100.00%	100.00%	100.00%

=== 2020 census ===
As of the 2020 census, Fredericksburg had a population of 27,982, a median age of 31.6 years, 20.5% of residents under the age of 18, and 12.4% of residents 65 years of age or older.

For every 100 females there were 86.8 males, and for every 100 females age 18 and over there were 82.1 males age 18 and over.

100.0% of residents lived in urban areas, while 0.0% lived in rural areas.

There were 11,275 households in Fredericksburg, of which 28.0% had children under the age of 18 living in them. Of all households, 32.6% were married-couple households, 23.1% were households with a male householder and no spouse or partner present, and 35.7% were households with a female householder and no spouse or partner present. About 36.1% of all households were made up of individuals and 11.3% had someone living alone who was 65 years of age or older.

There were 12,175 housing units, of which 7.4% were vacant. The homeowner vacancy rate was 2.5% and the rental vacancy rate was 6.2%.

Racial composition as of the 2020 census
Race	Number	Percent
White	15,872	56.7%
Black or African American	6,135	21.9%
American Indian and Alaska Native	180	0.6%
Asian	1,334	4.8%
Native Hawaiian and Other Pacific Islander	30	0.1%
Some other race	1,754	6.3%
Two or more races	2,677	9.6%
Hispanic or Latino (of any race)	3,472	12.4%

=== American Community Survey 2022 ===
According to the 2022 American Community Survey 5-year estimates, the median household income in the city is $83,445 and the median income for a family is $121,781.

The per capita income for the city is $43,063, and 18% of the population is below the poverty line.

== Arts and culture ==
=== Architecture and historic sites ===
- Fredericksburg Historic District
- U.S. National Register of Historic Places
- U.S. Historic district
- Virginia Landmarks Register
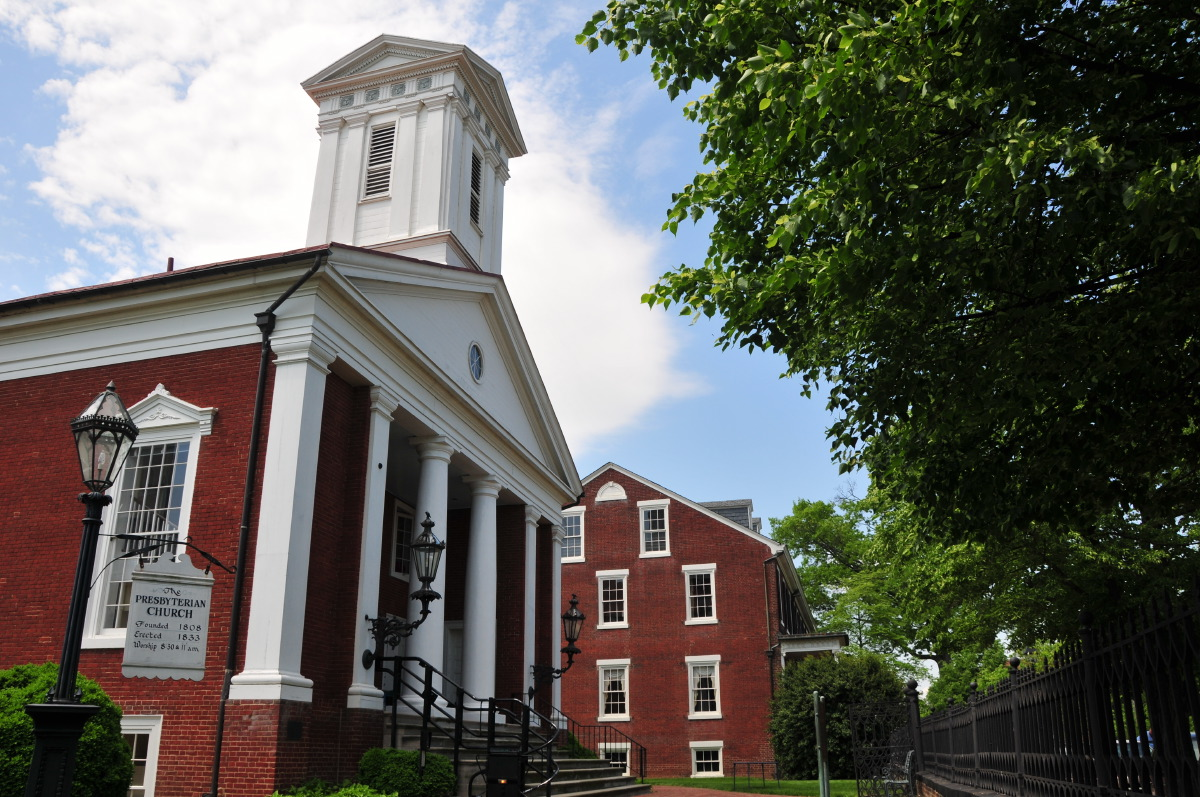
- Location: Roughly bounded by Rappahannock River, Hazel Run, Prince Edward and Canal Sts., Fredericksburg, Virginia
- Area: 200 acres (81 ha)
- NRHP reference No.: 71001053
- VLR No.: 111-0132

Significant dates
- Added to NRHP: September 22, 1971
- Designated VLR: March 2, 1971

Despite recent decades of suburban growth, reminders of the area's past abound. The 40-block Fredericksburg Historic District, listed on the National Register of Historic Places, embraces the city's downtown area and contains more than 350 buildings and locations dating to the 18th and 19th centuries, including the Fredericksburg Town Hall and Market Square, Lewis Store, and former site of the Slave Auction Block.

Within the historic district, four 18th-century historic sites have been managed by the "Washington Heritage Museums": the Mary Washington House, where George Washington's mother lived in her final years; the late 18th-century Rising Sun Tavern, and the Hugh Mercer Apothecary Shop (the fourth, the St. James House (built 1768), is open to the public only during Historic Garden Week). Important public buildings include the 1852 courthouse designed by James Renwick, whose works include the Smithsonian Institution's castle building in Washington and St. Patrick's Cathedral in New York City, and the 1816 town hall and market house, now operated as the Fredericksburg Area Museum and Cultural Center. Another site of interest is St. George's Church. The James Monroe Museum and Memorial Library is located on the site where Monroe practiced law from 1786 to 1788. The museum is housed in a building made up of three individual structures, constructed at different times, beginning in 1816.

Near the historic district is Kenmore, the plantation home of George Washington's sister Betty and her husband, Fielding Lewis.

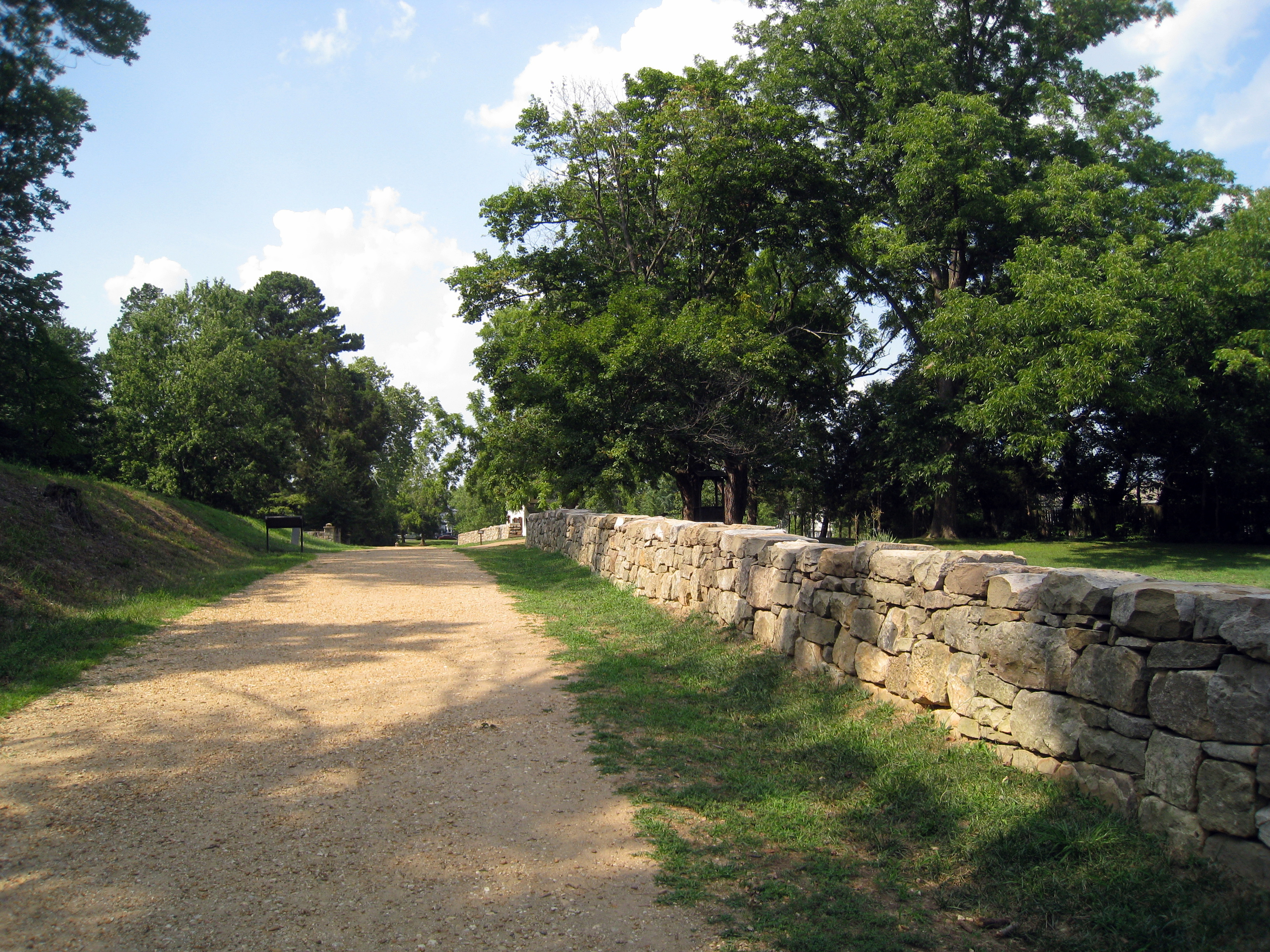
Fredericksburg and Spotsylvania National Military Park

Civil War battles are commemorated in Fredericksburg and Spotsylvania National Military Park, which includes several landmarks in the Fredericksburg area. Formed by an act of Congress in 1927, the national military park preserves portions of the battlefields of Fredericksburg, Chancellorsville, the Wilderness, and Spotsylvania Court House. Chatham Manor lies east of downtown Fredericksburg; the historic home was a slave plantation before being occupied by the Union Army during the Battle of Fredericksburg and used as a field hospital. The Fredericksburg National Cemetery was developed by the federal government after the war on Marye's Heights on the Fredericksburg battlefield. It contains more than 15,000 Union burials from the area's battlefields, as well as many unidentified soldiers buried in mass graves.

Among the 10,000 slaves crossing the Rappahannock for freedom in 1862 was John Washington. A literate slave from Fredericksburg, he settled in New York and wrote an account of the wartime events several years later. His manuscript was discovered in the 1990s. It was published as the basis of two books, David W. Blight's A Slave No More (2007), and John Washington's Civil War: A Slave Narrative (2008), edited by Crandall Shifflett. In 2010, the National Park Service, which manages the battlefield, Stafford County, and the City of Fredericksburg worked collaboratively to post new historical markers on either side of the Rappahannock River as part of a "Freedom Trail" to mark this exodus.

Notable 20th-century sites and structures include the campus of the University of Mary Washington (begun in 1908), and Carl's Ice Cream, an Art Moderne roadside ice cream stand, listed on the National Register of Historic Places.

Nearby points of interest include Ferry Farm historic site across the Rappahannock in Stafford County where Washington spent his boyhood, and the George Washington Birthplace National Monument, located 38 miles (61 km) to the east in Westmoreland County on the Northern Neck. The historic community of Falmouth lies immediately to the north and includes the historic house Belmont, home of American Impressionist artist Gari Melchers.

=== Public Library ===
- Central Rappahannock Regional Library

== Sports and recreation ==
The Fredericksburg Nationals minor league baseball team began play at Virginia Credit Union Stadium in 2021.

Sports at the secondary education level are run through the Virginia High School League. On the collegiate level are the University of Mary Washington Eagles. Other amateur athletics include Fredericksburg FC of the National Premier Soccer League (NPSL); and the Rappahannock Rugby Football Club, a senior men's and women's rugby club competing in Division II (men) and Division III (women) of the Capital Rugby Union.

Public parks run by the city include:

- Old Mill Park
- Alum Spring Park
- Hurkamp Park
- Dixon Park

== Government and politics ==
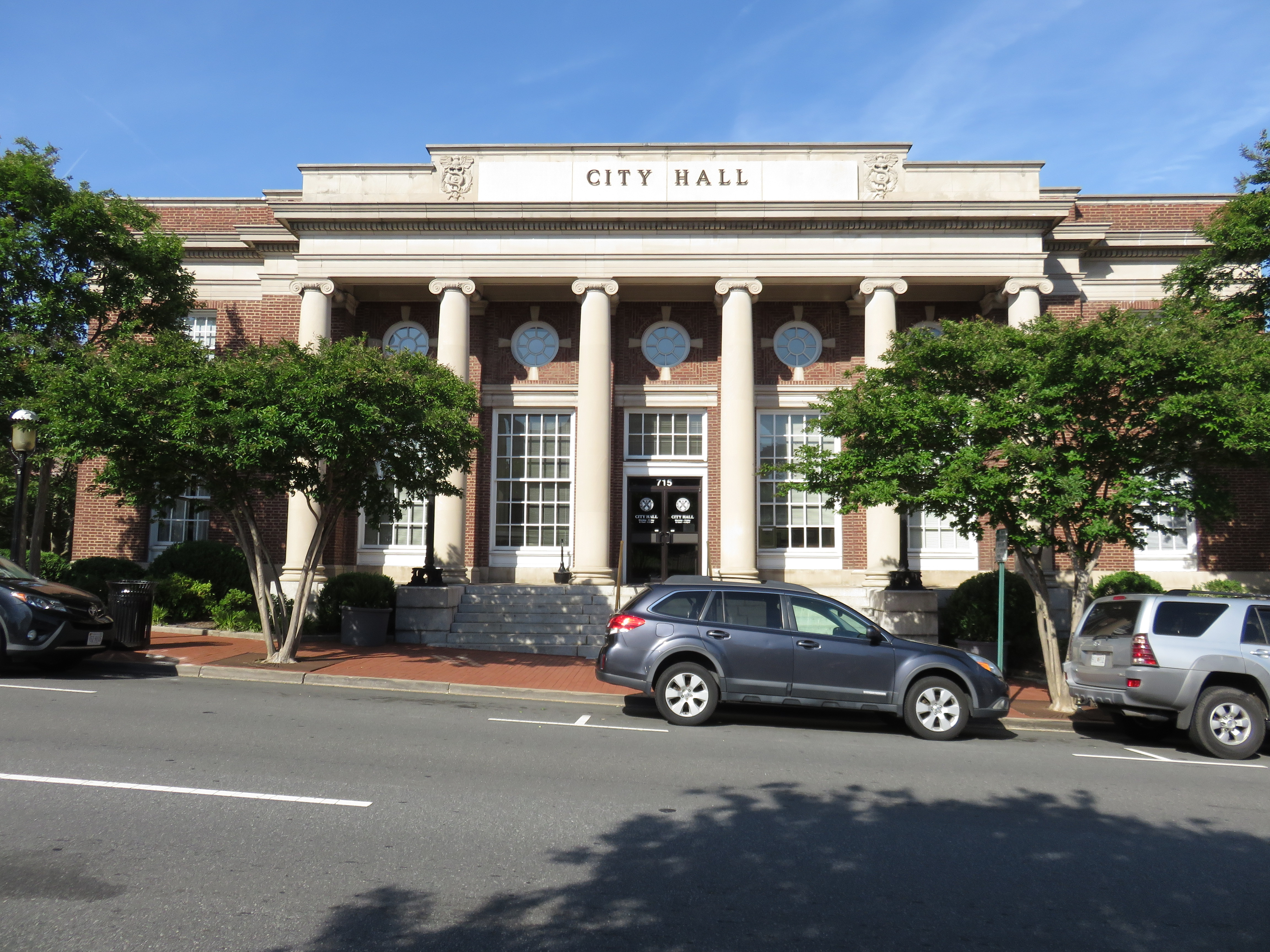
Fredericksburg City Hall

By long-standing tradition (dating back to the Federal Hatch Act of 1939, which prohibited government employees from participating in partisan politics), local elections in Fredericksburg are officially non-partisan. Neither the mayoral and council elections nor local constitutional positions (e.g. sheriff, Commissioner of Revenue, Commonwealth Attorney) list candidates with a party label.

United States presidential election results for Fredericksburg, Virginia
Year	Republican		Democratic		Third party(ies)	
Year	No.	%	No.	%	No.	%
1880	272	34.21%	523	65.79%	0	0.00%
1884	402	41.57%	562	58.12%	3	0.31%
1888	409	40.74%	595	59.26%	0	0.00%
1892	311	31.90%	655	67.18%	9	0.92%
1896	388	41.41%	533	56.88%	16	1.71%
1900	353	37.39%	587	62.18%	4	0.42%
1904	124	25.83%	352	73.33%	4	0.83%
1908	252	46.75%	285	52.88%	2	0.37%
1912	51	9.01%	414	73.14%	101	17.84%
1916	173	31.23%	380	68.59%	1	0.18%
1920	299	33.48%	581	65.06%	13	1.46%
1924	223	27.56%	558	68.97%	28	3.46%
1928	697	53.99%	594	46.01%	0	0.00%
1932	366	30.73%	812	68.18%	13	1.09%
1936	411	30.29%	944	69.57%	2	0.15%
1940	522	33.35%	1,037	66.26%	6	0.38%
1944	698	38.93%	1,092	60.90%	3	0.17%
1948	810	41.95%	816	42.26%	305	15.79%
1952	1,536	61.20%	970	38.65%	4	0.16%
1956	1,672	60.25%	934	33.66%	169	6.09%
1960	1,566	53.72%	1,326	45.49%	23	0.79%
1964	1,511	38.47%	2,410	61.35%	7	0.18%
1968	2,142	42.27%	2,036	40.17%	890	17.56%
1972	3,211	64.53%	1,702	34.20%	63	1.27%
1976	2,527	49.07%	2,550	49.51%	73	1.42%
1980	2,502	50.36%	2,174	43.76%	292	5.88%
1984	3,500	58.60%	2,439	40.83%	34	0.57%
1988	3,401	55.26%	2,683	43.60%	70	1.14%
1992	2,819	40.98%	3,266	47.48%	794	11.54%
1996	2,579	41.84%	3,215	52.16%	370	6.00%
2000	2,935	43.93%	3,360	50.29%	386	5.78%
2004	3,390	44.95%	4,085	54.16%	67	0.89%
2008	3,413	35.27%	6,155	63.60%	109	1.13%
2012	4,060	35.50%	7,131	62.35%	246	2.15%
2016	3,744	33.24%	6,707	59.54%	813	7.22%
2020	4,037	31.39%	8,517	66.22%	308	2.39%
2024	4,480	32.99%	8,760	64.52%	338	2.49%

Like the rest of Northern Virginia, Fredericksburg has trended strongly Democratic in the early 21st century. In the 2008 presidential election, voters in Fredericksburg gave Barack Obama a total of 63.6% of the vote. Only Arlington County, Alexandria, and Falls Church in Northern Virginia had a higher percentage of votes for Obama. No Republican presidential candidate has carried Fredericksburg since George H. W. Bush did so in 1988. In the 2016 presidential election, then-candidate Donald Trump garnered the lowest percentage of the city's vote for any Republican candidate since 1936; about two percent fewer votes were garnered in 2020.

Fredericksburg operates with a council-manager government, with Kerry Devine as the current mayor, first elected in 2024.

The following is the current makeup of City Council.

Position	Name	Affiliation	District
Mayor	Kerry Devine	Independent	At-Large
Vice Mayor	Charlie Frye Jr.	Independent	Ward 4
Member	Matt Rowe	Independent	Ward 1
Member	Joy Crump	Independent	Ward 2
Member	Susanna Finn	Independent	Ward 3
Member	Jannan Holmes	Independent	At-Large
Member	Will Mackintosh	Independent	At-Large

== Education ==
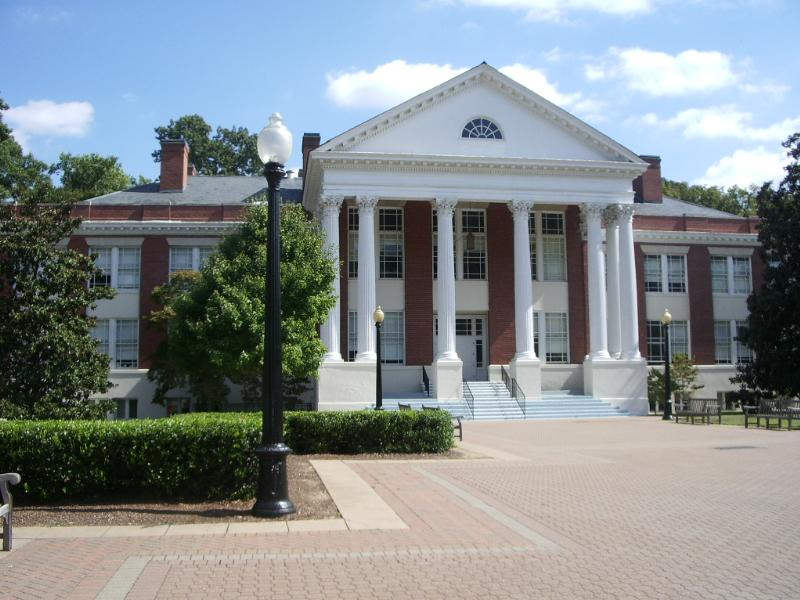
Monroe Hall, built in 1911, at the University of Mary Washington

=== Primary and secondary schools ===
The Fredericksburg City Public Schools are run independently of the surrounding counties. The public primary and secondary schools include:

- James Monroe High School
- Walker-Grant Middle School
- Hugh Mercer Elementary School
- Lafayette Elementary School
- Gladys West Elementary School

Private schools include:

- Fredericksburg Academy
- Fredericksburg Christian School
- Saint Michael the Archangel High School
- Lighthouse Academy

=== Higher education ===
The University of Mary Washington, established in 1908 and opened in 1911, is a four-year public university within the city.

Germanna Community College, established in 1970, is a public two-year program with a campus in Fredericksburg.

== Media ==
Fredericksburg's daily newspaper is The Free Lance–Star. The Free Lance was first published in 1885, and competed with two twice-weekly papers in the city during the late 19th century, the Fredericksburg News and The Virginia Star. While the News folded in 1884, the Star moved to daily publication in 1893. In 1900, the two companies merged, with both newspapers continuing publication until 1926, when they merged as a single daily newspaper under the current title. Until June 19, 2014, the Free Lance–Star was owned and operated by members of the Rowe family of Fredericksburg. At that time, Sandton Capital Partners purchased the paper. On December 31, 2015, the newspaper and associated website were purchased by Berkshire Hathaway's BH Media Group.

Fredericksburg Today, an online hyperlocal news site began operation following the 2014 bankruptcy of The Free Lance–Star. In 2024, Fredericksburg Today was replaced by The Fredericksburg Free Press, a 501(c)(3) nonprofit dedicated to providing impartial and nonpartisan digital news to the Fredericksburg region.

The FXBG Advance, a nonprofit Substack-based local news site, was founded in 2023.

Fredericksburg and the nearby region have several radio stations, including (on the FM dial) WQIQ (88.3, "Radio IQ", public radio, licensed to nearby Spotsylvania), WLJV (89.5, contemporary Christian), WPER (90.5, Christian), WFLS (93.3, country), WGRQ (95.9, "SuperHits", classic hits, licensed to nearby Fairview Beach), WWUZ (96.9, Active/Mainstream rock, licensed to nearby Bowling Green), WVBX (99.3, contemporary hit radio, licensed to nearby Spotsylvania), WBQB ("B-101.5", adult contemporary) and WGRX ("Thunder 104.5", country, licensed to nearby Falmouth). Fredericksburg AM stations include WFVA (1230, news and talk) and WNTX (1350, talk, news, and sports). WGRQ and WGRX are owned locally by Telemedia Broadcasting. WFLS, WWUZ, WVBX, and WNTX are owned by Alpha Media.

In 2001, the Arbitron media service began listing the Fredericksburg area as a nationally rated radio market. As of the fall of 2014, the area ranked 146th out of 272 markets surveyed, with a total market population of more than 325,000. Large broadcast companies like Clear Channel Communications and Cumulus Broadcasting are not active in the local market; almost all of its stations remain locally or regionally owned.

In television, Fredericksburg is part of the Washington market. One local television station, NBC affiliate WHFV, was briefly on the air in the 1970s before shutting down due to financial and legal troubles.

From 1997 to 2005, Studio Ironcat, a small publishing company dedicated to publication of manga and later, Amerimanga, was based in Fredericksburg.

== Transportation ==
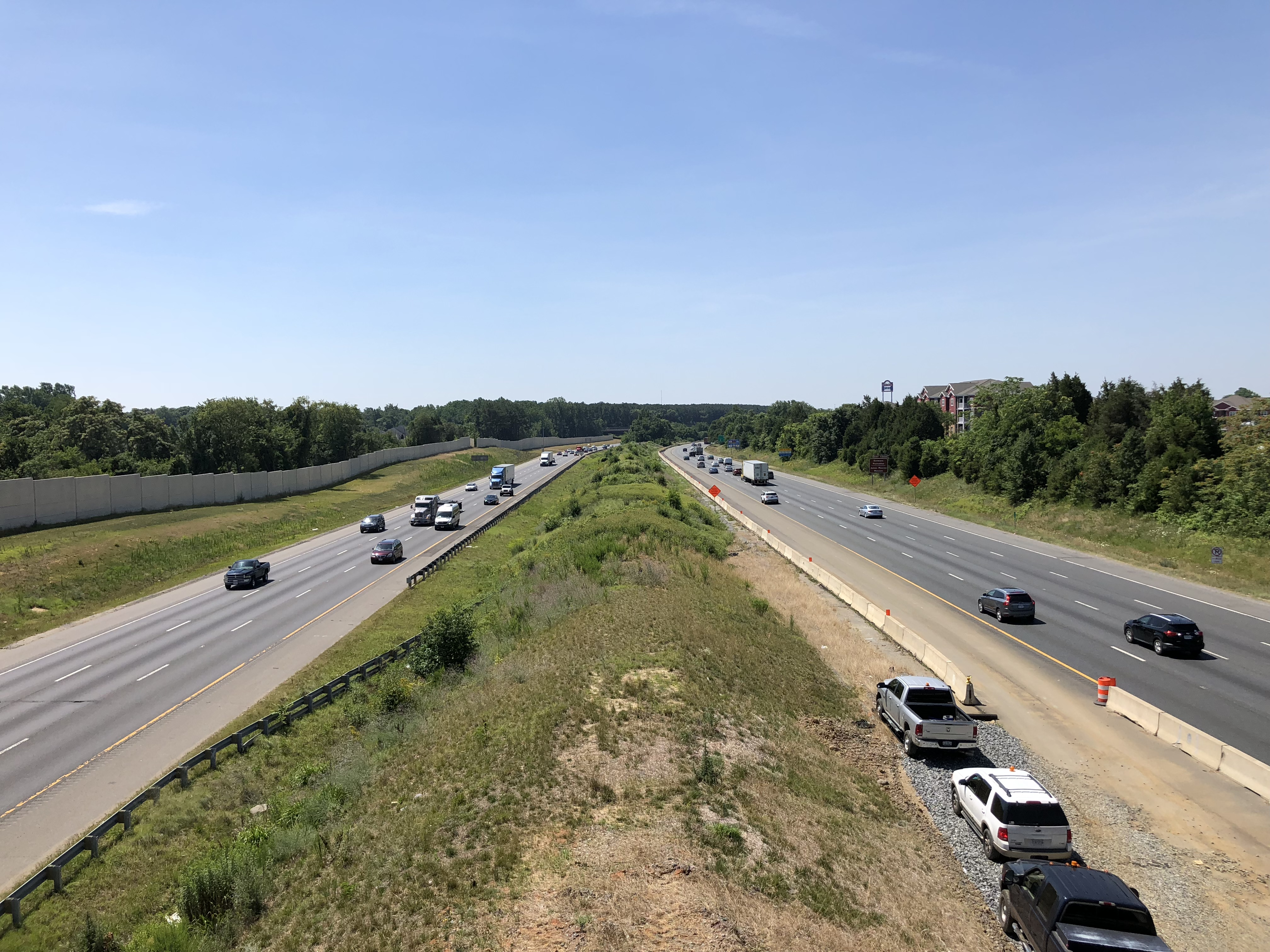
I-95 and US 17 in Fredericksburg

Fredericksburg is traversed by a series of rural and suburban four-lane highways and a multitude of small, two-lane roads. The primary highway serving Fredericksburg is Interstate 95, which connects northward to Washington, D.C. and southward to Richmond, Virginia. Among the major arterial roads is U.S. Route 17, providing northwest–southeast transportation across the region. Through Fredericksburg, I-95 and US 17 are concurrent, though a local business route on the latter provides local access to downtown. Route 3 (Plank Road) is a major east–west route that connects downtown Fredericksburg (via the Blue and Gray Parkway bypass), southern Stafford and King George counties, and Route 301 to the east with the large shopping centers, Spotsylvania Town Center and Central Park. To the west, Route 3 reaches Culpeper, where it meets Route 29 and Route 15.

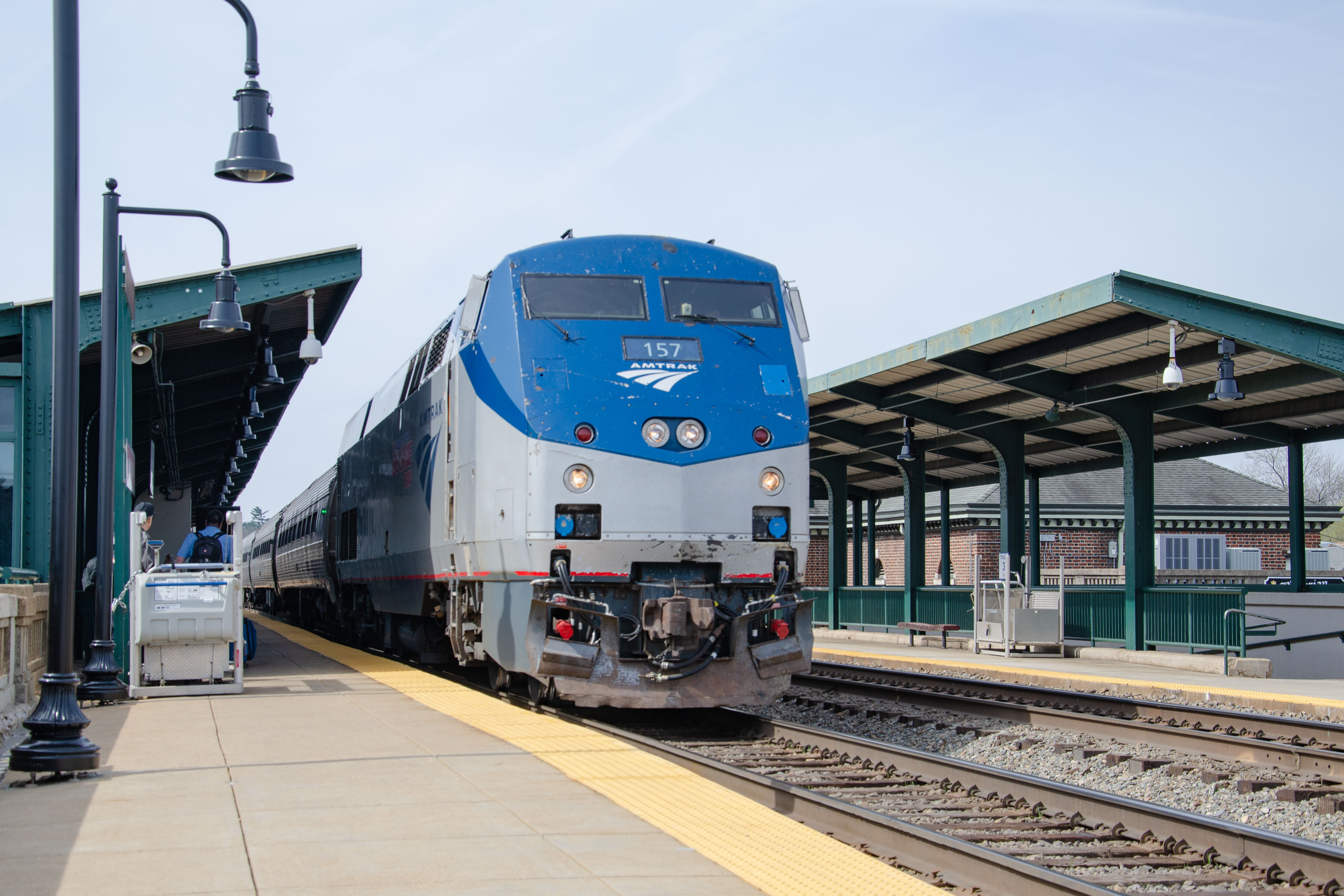
The Northeast Regional at Fredericksburg station

Most of Fredericksburg's traffic flow is to or from the north (Washington, D.C. metropolitan area) during peak commuting hours, primarily via I-95 and U.S. Route 1. The Route 1 bridge over the Rappahannock River is often a traffic bottleneck, and Route 3 has become increasingly congested as residential development grows and as the location of major regional shopping centers.

As an alternative to I-95, some commuters use the Virginia Railway Express rail service to Washington. Long-distance rail service to the north is available on Amtrak's Northeast Regional trains. Long-distance rail service to the south is provided by Amtrak's Silver Meteor, Carolinian, Palmetto and Piedmont trains

Fredericksburg Regional Transit (FRED) is a bus service that started in 1996 in Fredericksburg and serves most area communities, retail shopping centers, two VRE stations, and downtown Fredericksburg.

Four major airports serve Fredericksburg and the surrounding area. Reagan National and Dulles International Airports are to the north within Virginia. Beyond them to the northeast is Baltimore/Washington International Airport in Maryland, and Richmond International Airport is south of Fredericksburg.

== Notable people ==
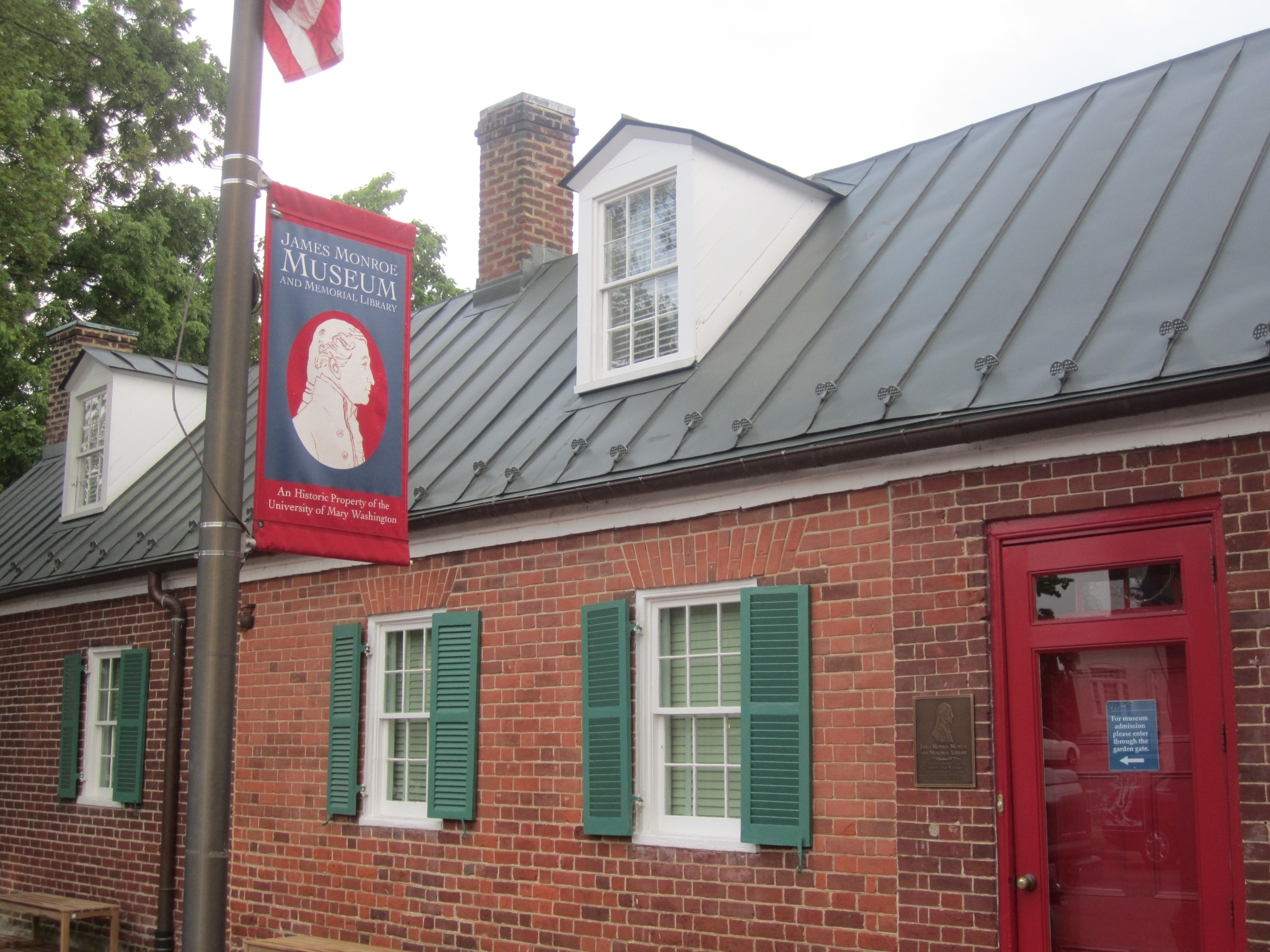
James Monroe Museum in downtown Fredericksburg

=== 19th century and earlier ===
- Lewis Craig (brother of Elijah Craig), Baptist preacher imprisoned for religious freedom issues before the American Revolution, leader of The Travelling Church that migrated to Kentucky (see History of Baptists in Kentucky)
- Henry Crist, former Congressman from Kentucky
- Maria I. Johnston, author and editor
- John Paul Jones, American naval commander
- Fielding Lewis, brother-in-law of George Washington
- Elizabeth "Betty" Washington, sister of George Washington
- Hugh Mercer, soldier and physician
- James Monroe, fifth President of the United States
- Margaret Prior (1773–1842), American humanitarian, missionary, moral reform worker, writer
- Augustine Washington, father of George Washington
- George Washington, first President of the United States, leader of the American Revolutionary War
- Mary Ball Washington, mother of George Washington
- George Weedon, brigadier general in the Continental Army

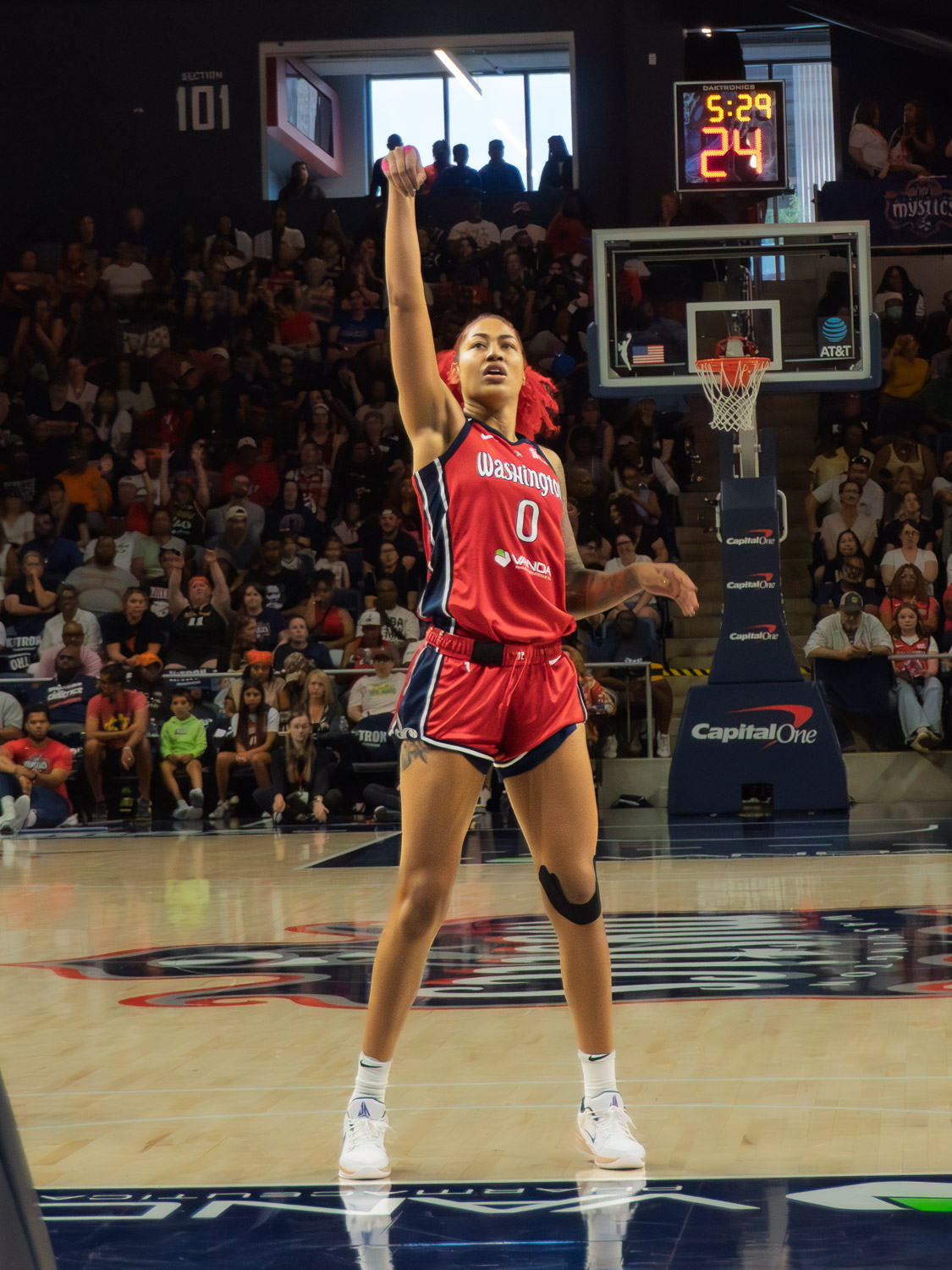
Shakira Austin of the WNBA

=== 20th century to present ===
- Oliver Ackermann, guitarist and vocalist for A Place to Bury Strangers
- Gaye Adegbalola, blues musician and activist
- Shakira Austin (born 2000), center for the Washington Mystics
- Daniel Bachman, American primitive guitarist
- Urbane F. Bass, doctor and Army officer during WWI
- Julien Binford, artist
- Al Bumbry, baseball player
- Jermon Bushrod, NFL player drafted by the New Orleans Saints (125th pick) in 2007 draft
- Caressa Cameron, Miss America 2010
- Eli Carr, soccer player who represented the Puerto Rico national team
- George Coghill, retired defensive back for the Denver Broncos
- James Farmer, civil rights leader
- Bessie Alexander Ficklen (1861–1945), writer, poet, artist
- Yetur Gross-Matos, NFL player for the Carolina Panthers
- Derek Hartley, radio show host
- Huntley, musician and winner of season 24 of The Voice
- Kelvin Jones, professional soccer player
- Mark Lenzi, Olympic diver and gold medalist
- John Maine, New York Mets starting pitcher
- Danny McBride, actor
- Ryan McBroom, American professional baseball player for the Kansas City Royals
- Erin McKeown, musician
- Caelynn Miller-Keyes, television personality, model, and beauty pageant titleholder
- George C. Rawlings, Virginia House of Delegates
- Judge Reinhold, actor
- Jack Rose, musician
- Jeff Rouse, Olympic swimmer, gold medalist and former world record holder
- Dave Smalley, musician, member of All, Dag Nasty, Down by Law, The Sharpshooters
- Torrey Smith, NFL football player
- Laura Sumner, numismatist
- Ginnie Sebastian Storage, 47th President General of the Daughters of the American Revolution
- William P. Taylor, congressman
- Keller Williams, musician
- Monty Williams, basketball player

== Sister cities ==
- Este, Italy
- Fréjus, France
- Kathmandu, Nepal
- Princes Town, Ghana
- Schwetzingen, Germany
