= Philip Levy (historian) =

American historian and archaeologist

Philip Levy is an American historian and archaeologist. He received his Ph.D. in American History from William and Mary in 2001. He, along with David Muraca, is a co-leader of the excavation of Ferry Farm, the site of George Washington's childhood home. Levy and Muraca are credited with finding the foundations of the house where Washington was raised. He is an associate professor at the University of South Florida. His fields of research are Early America, Virginia History, Place and Landscape, Historical Archaeology, and Public History.

Levy was also involved in disputing Donald A. Grinde Jr. and Bruce E. Johansen's claim that the Iroquois influenced the structure of the United States government. Their claim was that the founders had contact with and admired the Iroquois Confederacy. Levy countered that the primary documents did not support this claim.

He authored a book published in 2007 entitled Fellow Travelers: Indians and Europeans Contesting the Early American Trail. He is also the author of Where The Cherry Tree Grew: The Story of Ferry Farm, George Washington’s Boyhood Home.
