= Fielding Lewis =

American merchant and politician (1725–1781)

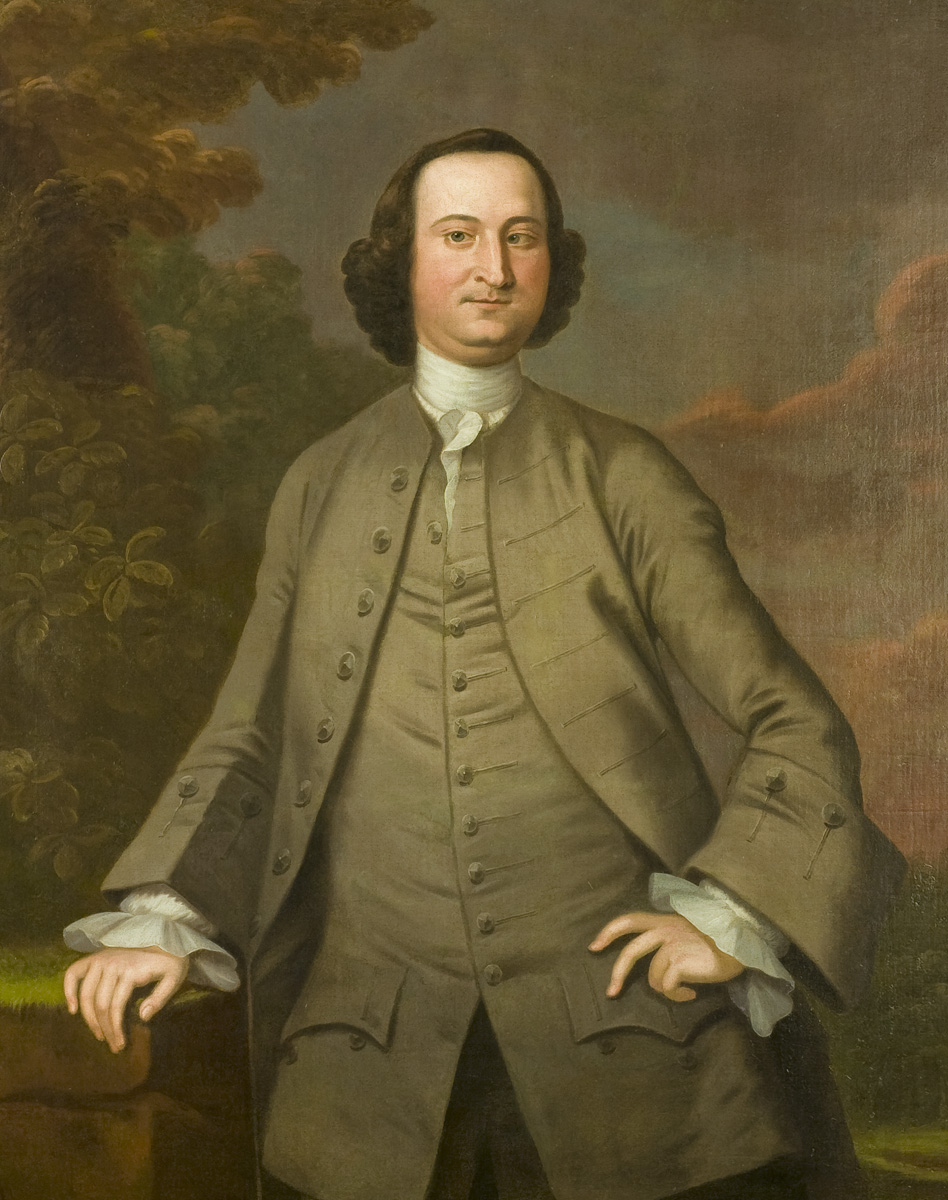

Member of the House of Burgesses from Spotsylvania County
- In office 1760–1768 Serving with Zachariah Lewis, Benjamin Grymes, William Johnson
- Preceded by: William Waller
- Succeeded by: Peter Marye

Personal details
- Born: July 7, 1725 Warner Hall, Gloucester County, Colony of Virginia
- Died: December 7, 1781 (aged 56) Fredericksburg, Virginia
- Spouses: Catharine Washington (m. 1746; died 1750) Elizabeth Washington (m. 1750)
- Relations: George Washington (Second Cousin and brother-in-law)
- Children: 14
- Parent(s): John Lewis; Frances Fielding Lewis
- Occupation: Merchant, soldier

Fielding Lewis (July 7, 1725 – December 7, 1781) was an American merchant, member of the House of Burgesses and a Colonel during the American Revolutionary War. He lived in Fredericksburg, Virginia and also owned a plantation in Spotsylvania County, which later became known as Kenmore. His brother-in-law was George Washington, who was also his 2nd cousin, he was also 2nd cousins with Betty Washington.

== Early life and education ==
Lewis was born at Warner Hall, a plantation in Gloucester County, Colony of Virginia. He was third of seven children born to John Lewis IV (1694–1754), a merchant and planter (also known as Colonel John Lewis), and Frances Fielding (c. 1702–1731). His mother was the only heir of Henry Fielding of King and Queen County. His mother died in childbirth when he was six years old, and his father remarried shortly thereafter, to Priscilla Churchill Carter, the widow of Robert Carter II. His father named one of his ships the Priscilla, but he may have made his fortune as guardian of the two Carter children, who were raised with Fielding and his elder brother Warner Lewis (who would inherit Warner Hall) at Warner Hall. The marriage may also have contributed to John Lewis' appointment to the Virginia Council of State.

His paternal uncle, Robert Lewis (1704–1765) (who may have served as a burgess for Louisa County in the session of 1742–1747), became the grandfather of Meriwether Lewis, who would explore the Louisiana Purchase.

== Career ==
His merchant father traded at a store in Fredericksburg, and Fielding assisted him before taking over the business during the 1750s. John Lewis traded grain with the West Indies, and Fielding would also become involved in real estate investments, as president of the Dismal Swamp Land Company and investor in bank stocks. In 1749, John Lewis had a fine retail building constructed to both display and store his wares. The sandstone quoins, usually found only on larger mansions, displayed his aspirations. Lewis was established as a successful merchant before the American Revolutionary War.

Lewis also had a plantation in Spotsylvania County south of Fredericksburg, which he operated using enslaved labor. The mother of his second wife Betty, Mary Ball Washington, frequently visited and had a favorite spot she called her "meditation rock". In 1769, Fielding and Betty started construction of a large Georgian mansion on their property, which was completed in 1775. It has some of the most refined colonial interior finishes of any surviving mansion. Named by later owners as Kenmore Plantation, it has been designated a National Historic Landmark and is listed on the National Register of Historic Places.

Spotsylvania County voters elected Lewis to represent them in the House of Burgesses following the death of William Waller before the 1760 session, and he served alongside Zachariah Lewis, then William Grymes, William Johnson and Benjamin Grymes. Years earlier, Lewis had sought a place on the Governor's Council, but that went to his stepbrother Robert Carter of Nomini Hall.

As relations with Britain soured, Lewis, who commanded the local militia, accepted appointment as Commissary General of Munitions, with the rank of colonel.

== Personal life ==
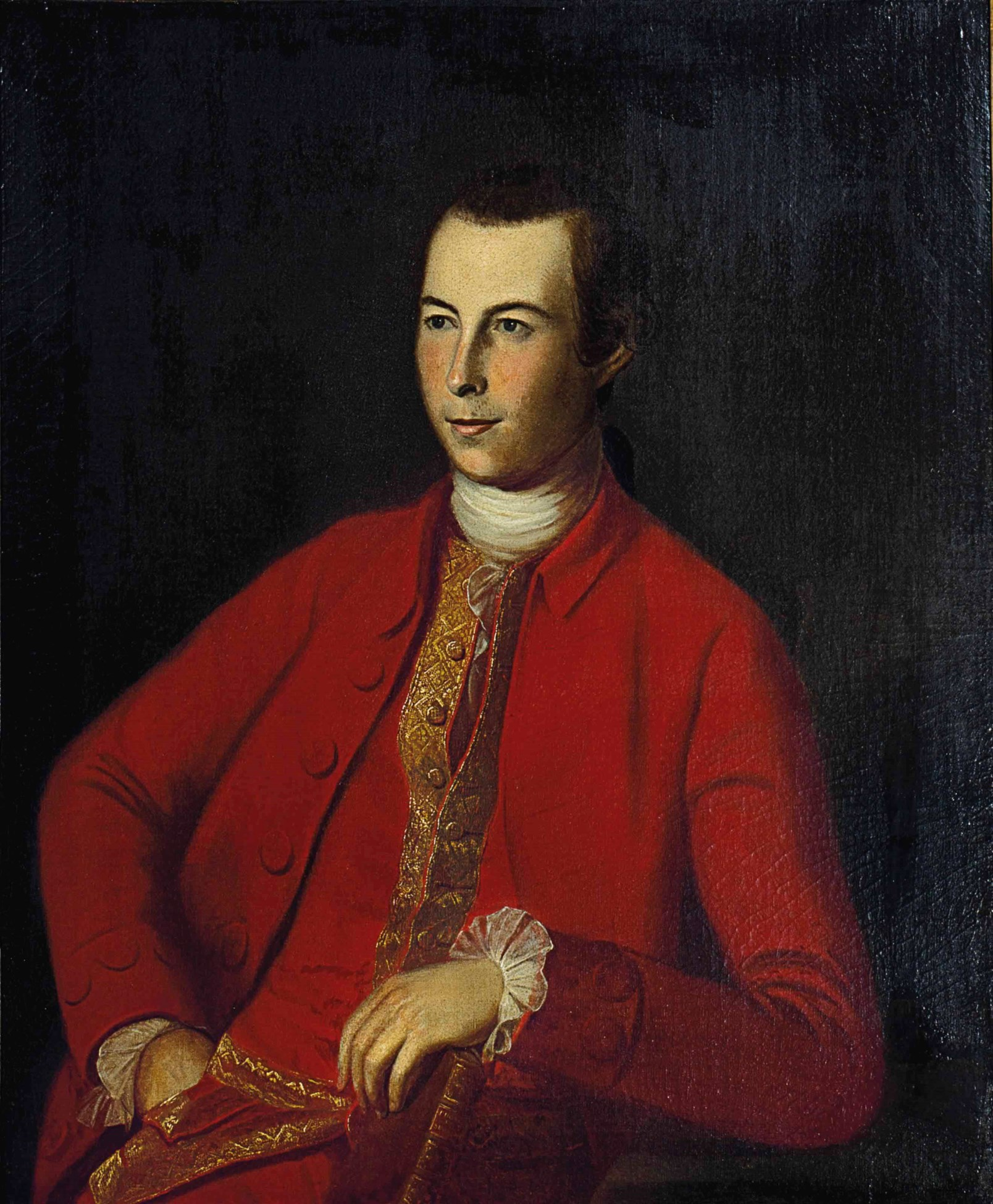
Portrait of Captain John Lewis (1747–1825) by Charles Willson Peale

As was common among the First Families of Virginia, Lewis married relatives. On October 18, 1746. Lewis married his second cousin Catharine Washington, the daughter of John Washington (an uncle of George Washington) and Catharine Whiting. They had three children before she died on February 19, 1750, including: .

- John Lewis (1747–1825)
- Francis Lewis (1748; died in childhood)
- Warner Lewis (1750–1750)

After a short mourning period, on May 7, 1750, Lewis married 16 year old Elizabeth Washington (1733–1797), the sister of George Washington and another second cousin. They had 11 children together, including:

- Fielding Lewis Jr. (1751–1803), who married Anne Alexander and, after her death, Nancy Alexander. He had children by both wives.
- Augustine Lewis (1752–1756), who died as a child.
- Warner Lewis (1755–1756), who died in infancy.
- George Washington Lewis (1757–1831), who married Catherine Daingerfield, had issue (grandparents of Princess Catherine Murat).
- Mary Lewis (1759–1759), who died in infancy.
- Charles Lewis (1760–1775)
- Samuel Lewis (1762–1764)
- Elizabeth Lewis (1765–1830), who married distant cousin Charles Carter, had issue.
- Lawrence Lewis (1767–1839), who married step-cousin Eleanor Parke Custis (George Washington's step-granddaughter) and had children.
- Robert Lewis (1769–1829), who married cousin Judith Carter Browne and had children.
- Howell Lewis Sr. (1771–1822), who married Ellen Hackley Pollard and had several children

Lewis' great-granddaughter Catherine Willis Gray married into the Bonaparte-Murat family of France. A sixth-generation descendant, Fielding Lewis Wright, served as Governor of Mississippi.

== Death and legacy ==
Lewis died in Fredericksburg in 1781 at the end of the Revolutionary War. Before her death in 1789, Mary Washington asked to be buried at her favorite spot at Kenmore, and her daughter Betty arranged for that. Betty outlived Lewis by 16 years, dying in 1797.

In 1833 a memorial was started at Mary Washington's gravesite, but never completed. Following the United States Centennial in 1889, numerous historic and lineage societies were formed; the National Mary Washington Memorial Association held fundraising events and commissioned a memorial for her gravesite. It was dedicated in 1894 at Mary Washington's gravesite in a ceremony presided over by President Grover Cleveland of the United States.

The Lewis mansion and property was later named Kenmore Plantation when purchased before the Civil War by people outside the Lewis family. It is now operated as a house museum, and open to the public for viewing. Fielding and his wife Elizabeth "Betty" Lewis are each commemorated with street names in the Ferry Farm subdivision outside Fredericksburg, with Fielding Circle and Betty Lewis Drive.

In the late 20th century, the Kenmore Plantation purchased Ferry Farm, the property said to be George Washington's boyhood home, to keep it from being developed.

In 1999, the Virginia Society, Sons of the American Revolution chartered the Colonel Fielding Lewis Chapter SAR representing membership in the counties of King George, Caroline, Spotsylvania, Stafford and the City of Fredericksburg.
