= Ferry Farm, Virginia =

Unincorporated community in Virginia, US

Coordinates: 38°17′35″N 77°26′15″W

Ferry Farm is an unincorporated community in Stafford County, in the U.S. state of Virginia.
