= Kenmore (Fredericksburg, Virginia) =

Historic house in Virginia, United States

- U.S. National Register of Historic Places
- U.S. National Historic Landmark
- U.S. Historic district – Contributing property
- Virginia Landmarks Register
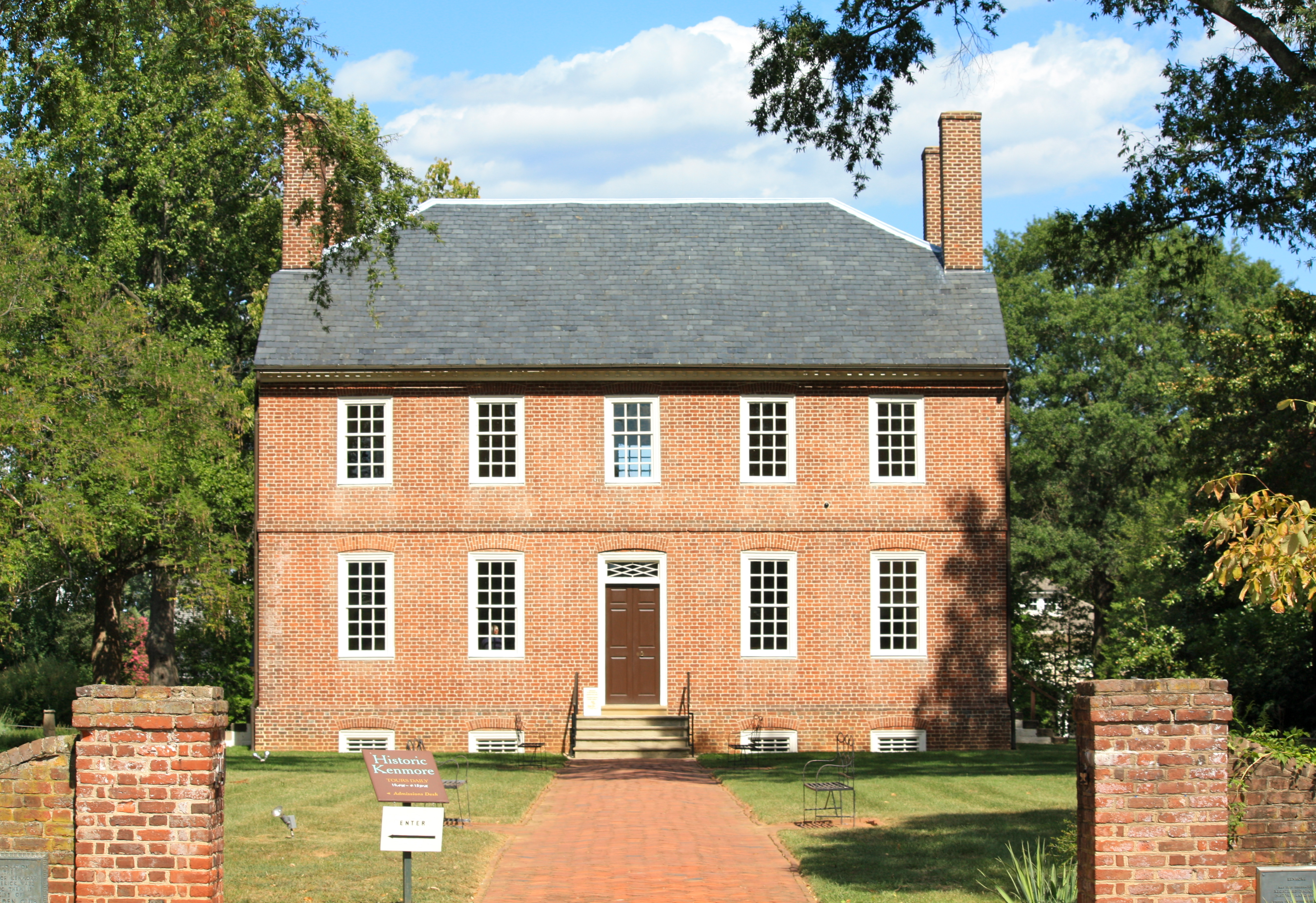
- Kenmore Plantation, 2010

- Location within Northern Virginia Location within Virginia Location within the United States
- Location: 1201 Washington Avenue, Fredericksburg, Virginia
- Coordinates: 38°18′15″N 77°27′58″W
- Area: 1 acre (0.4 ha)
- Built: 1770s
- Architectural style: Georgian
- Part of: Washington Avenue Historic District (ID02000518)
- NRHP reference No.: 69000325
- VLR No.: 111-0047

Significant dates
- Added to NRHP: June 4, 1969
- Designated NHL: April 15, 1970
- Designated CP: May 16, 2002
- Designated VLR: November 5, 1968

Historic Kenmore, formerly known as Kenmore Plantation, is a plantation house at 1201 Washington Avenue in Fredericksburg, Virginia. Built in the 1770s, it was the home of Fielding and Elizabeth Washington Lewis and is the only surviving structure from the 1,300-acre (530 ha) Kenmore plantation.

The house is architecturally notable for the remarkable decorative plaster work on the ceilings of many rooms on the first floor. In 1970 the property was declared a National Historic Landmark.

Kenmore is owned and operated as a house museum by The George Washington Foundation (formerly George Washington's Fredericksburg Foundation), and is open daily for guided tours. The Foundation also owns nearby Ferry Farm, where George Washington lived as a child.

== History ==
The house, referred to as Historic Kenmore, formerly as Kenmore Plantation, was completed in 1776 for Fielding and Elizabeth Washington Lewis, the sister of George Washington. He was a planter and successful merchant in town. Their plantation grew tobacco, wheat, and corn by the labor of slaves. The Lewises enslaved more than 80 people on the 1300-acre plantation, including a number of domestic slaves. The mansion's rear frontage was oriented to the Rappahannock River for easy transportation access.

Elizabeth's mother Mary Ball Washington was buried on the grounds, which she had liked to visit. Lewis descendants sold the house and property in 1797 after Elizabeth Washington Lewis' death. A memorial was erected in 1894 at the Mary Ball Washington gravesite.

The Samuel Gordon family purchased the property in 1819. They named it Kenmore for the home of their ancestors in Scotland. Other nineteenth century owners restored the plaster ceilings.

During the American Civil War, the plantation house and outbuildings were used as a makeshift Union military hospital after the Battle of the Wilderness in 1864. It was also used by federal troops on their way to Richmond at the close of the war.

In 1922 the Kenmore Foundation bought the property and began plans to preserve it. Two flanking dependencies were reconstructed. The landscaping was restored in 1924 by Charles F. Gillette.

Today the house and reconstructed dependencies stand on three acres of ground at 1201 Washington Avenue. It was listed on the National Register of Historic Places in 1969 and was designated a National Historic Landmark in 1970. It is included in the Washington Avenue Historic District.

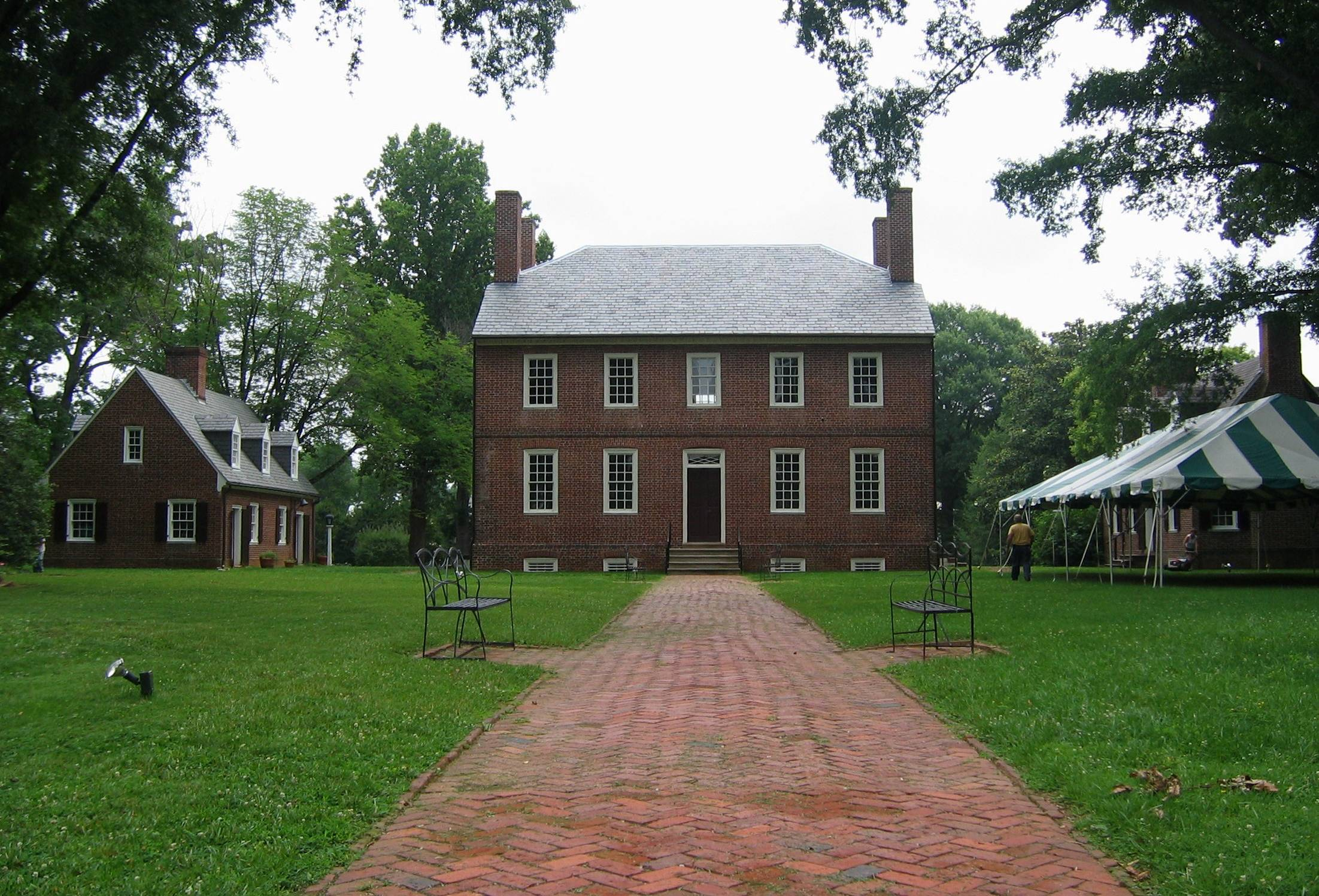
Kenmore Plantation in 2006

== See also ==
- List of National Historic Landmarks in Virginia
- National Register of Historic Places listings in Fredericksburg, Virginia
