= Ebenezer E. Mason =

- Born: August 25, 1829; Eastport, Maine, U.S.
- Died: June 18, 1910 (aged 80); Mount Vernon, Virginia, U.S.
- Occupation: farmer
- Title: magistrate, delegate
- Spouse: Elizabeth Thompson

Ebenezer Erskine Mason (August 28, 1829 – June 18, 1910) (a/k/a/ "Ebon" or "Eben") was a farmer who also served as a local magistrate and one of Fairfax County, Virginia's two delegates to the Wheeling Convention in 1861 which created the Restored Government of Virginia and led to the creation of the state of West Virginia.

== Early and family life ==
Mason was born in Eastport, Washington County, Maine on August 25, 1829, to Rachel Lincoln Mason of Perry, Maine, although his merchant sailor father John Mason was from New Hampshire. Their second son Otis Tufton Mason was also born in Maine before John Mason moved his family to Haddonfield, New Jersey where William Mason was born in 1841.

In 1849, John Mason moved his family to Fairfax County, Virginia. Three years earlier, Quakers had bought Woodlawn Plantation from relatives of Nellie Custis, whom George Washington had adopted a child, and were subdividing it. Mason took in boarders for income and to provide needed labor, and bought Woodlawn in 1853. Rachel gave birth to her last child, Anna, in 1854.

In that year Ebon Mason married Elizabeth Thompson. They had at least one daughter, Nellie, born in Maryland in 1862 and living with them in 1870 but not 1880.

== Career ==
By the 1860 census, Ebon Mason lived with his wife on a farm near his father's farm. His parents had attended Cavalry Baptist Church in Alexandria, Virginia, but in 1859 started a Sunday school in their home, that would become Woodlawn Baptist Church (received by the Potomac Association of Southern Baptists in 1869). Rachel Lincoln Mason was a cousin of Abraham Lincoln, the Republican Party Presidential candidate.

As the American Civil War started, Fairfax County voters seceded, but some Unionists established a Restored Government of Virginia. Ebon Mason, already a local magistrate and member of the Unionist Accotink Home Guard, was one of two delegates elected to represent Fairfax County at the Wheeling Convention, alongside Quaker (and neighbor) John Hawxhurst. Otis Mason had left for college at Columbia University in 1856 and remained in the north. William Mason was of draftable age and disappeared from local census records in 1870.

During the war years, both armies stole from local farms, but the Union Army occupation proved permanent. The Accotink Home Guard defended their property from Confederate raiders led by Col. John Singleton Mosby in the 1864 Action at Accotink in which one member from each force died.

In the 1870 census for Fairfax County, Mt. Vernon district, Ebon and Elizabeth lived with their 8-year-old daughter Nellie (who had been born in Maryland), as well as elderly domestic servant Betsie Dove (white, aged 63) and farmhand Henny Gaskings (black aged 19), both of whom were Virginia born. Their real estate was worth $4000, and they owned $1000 of other property. His parents continued to live and farm at Woodlawn, and by 1880 John's 85-year-old sister Sarah had joined them from New Hampshire. In the 1880 census, Betty Dove (aged 72) continued to live with Ebon and Elizabeth Mason as a household servant, but Nellie vanished (married or dead). Instead, the Masons supported their nephews William H. Mason (b. 1868) and Joseph Mason (b. 1870) on the farm.

Between those dates, Otis Mason gave land across from the Woodlawn Friends Meeting to establish Woodlawn Baptist Church in 1872. He preached there (although unordained) until the congregation called Rev. Sam Chapman, the "fighting parson" of Col. Mosby's Confederate Cavalry to its pulpit. Chapman served for two years before moving on; the congregation razed that building in 1992 to build a larger church, and recently merged with another congregation and changed its name.

== Death and legacy ==
Ebon Mason died on June 18, 1910. The Special Collections Division of Virginia Tech University in Blacksburg, Virginia makes his wartime diary 1864–1865 available online.

Eventually, Fort Belvoir expanded to encompass much of the area, and in 1992 the Woodlawn Baptist Church razed its 1872 building to build a larger one (and was merged into the Pillar Church in 2014). However, Woodlawn Farm was listed on the National Register of Historic Places in 1970, and as a National Historic Landmark in 1998, and is maintained as a museum by the National Trust for Historic Preservation. Expansion of Fort Belvoir and Route 1 in the area while preserving those historic sites is a current controversy.
