= Job Hawxhurst =

American politician (1823–1906)

Member of the Virginia House of Delegates from the Fairfax County, Virginia district
- In office October 5, 1869 – December 5, 1871
- Preceded by: D. W. Lewis
- Succeeded by: James Sangster

Personal details
- Born: March 30, 1823 Roslyn, New York, U.S.
- Died: March 7, 1906 (aged 82) Fairfax, Virginia, U.S.
- Spouse(s): Maria Whelan Leeds; Margaret Davies Borden
- Occupation: Farmer, miller, storekeeper, postmaster, politician

Job Hawxhurst (March 30, 1823 – March 7, 1906) was a nineteenth-century American Quaker from New York who moved to Fairfax County, Virginia, where he and his elder brother John Hawxhurst farmed and operated a grist mill beginning in 1846. As Union men, they fled Virginia temporarily as the American Civil War began in 1861. They returned to Fairfax County in early 1862 and led their communities for decades. Job Hawxhurst operated a general store in the Town of Fairfax. He was postmaster for three decades, as well as Fairfax County's delegate in the Virginia General Assembly for one term. At various times he served as Fairfax County Clerk of the Court, Mayor of Fairfax, and as a member of the Fairfax County Board of Supervisors. John Hawxhurst and his wife Jane lived in Alexandria, Virginia, after the war.

== Early and family life ==
Job Hawxhurst was born near Long Island's Hempstead Harbor in Roslyn, New York on March 30, 1823, to Townsend Hawxhurst (1779–1829) and his wife Rebecca. Townsend Hawxhurst was a Quaker minister who traveled extensively, including to Virginia. Job was their fourth child, with elder brothers John and Samuel and elder sister Anna. His mother later bore his brother Leonard and sister Esther, as well as the twins Elizabeth and Maria. Because their small farm could not support the family (particularly after Townsend died when Job was six), an uncle adopted Leonard. Job was adopted and raised by his widowed aunt Anna Allen and her sister Phila Hawxhurst at what had been his grandfather's home on the shore of Cow Bay on Great Neck, Long Island, New York. He attended a school run by James Motts, then an academy at Manhasset with James Close as teacher.

Job married Maria Whelan Leeds (1823–1856) on March 30, 1843, and they had seven children before her death shortly after the death of their daughter Ella: Edward W. Hawxhurst (1844–1860), Anna Maria Hawxhurst Watkins (1846–1946), George White Hawxhurst (1848–1932), Esther P. Hawxhurst (1850–1863), Jacob L. Hawxhurst (1852–1863), Jane K. Hawxhurst (b. 1854 and adopted by John and Jane Hawxhurst), and Ella Hawxhurst Betts (1856–1883; adopted by Elizabeth Hawxhurst). He remarried on June 16, 1860, to Margaret Davies Bordon (1843–1904), who had also been born in New York. She bore another five children, although only two survived her: Elmer Haxhurst (1862–1894), Wilbur Hawxhurst (1865–1906), Henry Hawxhurst (1868–1947), Roscoe Hawxhurst (1872–1897), Irene Hwxhurst (1876–1878), Agnex Hawxhurst (1878–1882). They also adopted Mamie Hawxhurst (1880–1907).

== Career ==
When Job was 16, his aunt Anna bought a farm in Great Neck, which Job was to manage, but after four years some defect in the title was discovered, so she never completed the purchase. They moved to Scipio, New York, after his marriage as discussed above, and worked uncle Leonard Searing's farm for a year. Job had met Maria about a year earlier, when he was best man at his uncle Charles Searing's wedding. Because Maria had inherited an interest in a farm in Burlington County, New Jersey, after spending the winter of 1843–44 at his mother's house (where Maria gave birth to their first child), they moved to New Jersey in 1844. They sold that property about a year later, because his elder brother John convinced them of opportunities in Virginia.

In February 1846 (about a month after the birth of their second child, Anna Maria), the Hawxhurst brothers moved with their families to Fairfax County, Virginia, where they farmed 470 acres in the Vale section (about 6 miles north of the Courthouse). They restored a gristmill to mill wheat into flour using the waterpower of Difficult Run. Maria's brother Isaac Leeds also married and settled in Virginia. They worshiped at the Woodlawn Quaker Meetinghouse on the other side of the county, or during the American Civil War (when that meetinghouse was used by Union troops), the home of fellow Quakers Jonathan Roberts and his wife Abigail at Accotink.

However, Maria died shortly after the death of her daughter Ella, leaving Job with seven young children to raise, plus the mill he and John had restored burned down. His sister Elizabeth Hawxhurst traveled to Virginia and helped with the family after Maria's death, and took baby Ella back to Sea Cliff, Long Island with her (where she eventually married and had three daughters before dying in childbirth like her mother). His brother John and wife Jane also took some of the children into their home, and adopted Janie.

The brothers opposed Virginia's secession after the election of President Abraham Lincoln. They were strong Union men during that conflict, but respected by Confederate sympathizing neighbors for various acts of kindness. Job had traveled north to Washington and New York when the conflict began, but returned in the spring of 1862 when Union forces occupied the town surrounding Fairfax Courthouse. The military authorities gave him permission to operate the store, which he basically did alone, since John was sent to Wheeling, Virginia. Job Hawxhurst continued to forsake the weapons others had advised him to carry for protection, and ran a general store there. He often traveled through Confederate lines and on roads notoriously infested by robbers and guerillas, and attributed his survival to this policy, as well as Divine Power and good luck. By 1865, Union forces occupied the entire county, and Job had also become the postmaster, a position he would fulfill for more than three decades (except during two Democratic administrations.

In 1869, after Fairfax County voters overwhelmingly approved the new state Constitution that his brother John had helped draft, they elected Job Hawxhurst as a Conservative or True Republican to represent them as their (part-time) delegate in the Virginia General Assembly. He won over a more radical nominee, with local Democrats appreciating his vocal opposition to the Confederate-disenfranching clauses in the new state constitution (which was overwhelmingly approved, although those clauses failed). Like most other members of that particular legislative session, that was his first and only term of legislative service. He also providentially survived the April, 1870 Virginia capitol collapse disaster (due to overcrowding at an important Court of Appeals case concerning the Richmond mayoral election) because he was running an errand in the state auditor's office.

Hawxhurst remained politically active, winning election as Clerk of the Circuit Court of Fairfax County, member of the Fairfax County Board of Supervisors, and the first mayor of the Town of Fairfax. Hawxhurst also drafted the first local option law in 1879, which the Virginia General Assembly passed and which permitted Fairfax County to adopt a temperance ordinance. He was also a charter member on June 18, 1867, of the Providence Lodge No. 3 at Fairfax Court House and the first grand chief templar of the Grand Lodge of Good Templars.

== Death ==
Job Hawxhurst suffered a stroke in 1902, and the resulting paralysis caused him to resign his postmastership, as well as led to a more general decline in his health. His wife died in 1904, and he moved to the home of his son George Hawxhurst, the mayor of Falls Church, Virginia. There Job Hawxhurst died on March 7, 1906, survived by three daughters and three sons. He is buried in the Fairfax City Cemetery.

The Fairfax City Regional Library has copies of typed transcripts of some of his, Anna's and Maria Hawxhurst's reminiscences and letters (1846, 1847, 1861–1866, 1897–1900) in its special collections. His son Wilbur Hawxhurst became a teacher and postal employee in Washington, D.C. His daughter in law, Mrs. George Hawxhurst, was one of the founders of the Equal Suffrage League of Virginia and president of the Arlington County League.
