= Lawrence Lewis (1767–1839) =

Virginia planter

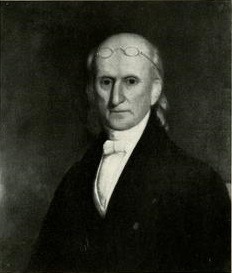

Personal details
- Born: April 4, 1767 Fredericksburg, Colony of Virginia, British America
- Died: November 20, 1839 (aged 72) Arlington, Virginia, U.S.
- Resting place: Mount Vernon, Fairfax County, Virginia, U.S.
- Spouse: Eleanor Parke Custis
- Children: 8
- Parent(s): Fielding Lewis; Elizabeth Washington Lewis

Military service
- Allegiance: United States
- Branch/service: United States Army
- Years of service: 1794
- Rank: Major
- Battles/wars: Whiskey Rebellion

Lawrence Lewis (April 4, 1767 – November 20, 1839) was a Virginia planter, possibly best known as the nephew of George Washington, who married Nelly Custis, a granddaughter of Martha Washington, and as one of the executors of the late president's estate.

== Early and family life ==
He was born in Fredericksburg, Colony of Virginia in 1767 to merchant and planter Fielding Lewis and his second wife, Elizabeth Washington Lewis, a sister of George Washington. In addition to his business in Fredericksburg, Fielding Lewis operated a plantation nearby using enslaved labor. The elder Lewis' first wife bore two sons (one of whom died as a child) and a daughter, who became young Lawrence's half siblings. Elizabeth Washington bore eleven children, of whom only two boys died. Thus, Lewis had an elder older half-brother (John Lewis; Warner Lewis not reaching maturity), five elder full brothers (Fielding Lewis Jr., Augustine Lewis, Warner Lewis, Charles Lewis and Samuel Lewis, the latter two never reaching adulthood) as well as two younger brothers, Robert Lewis and Howell Lewis. Of these family members, George Washington was the godfather of Warner Lewis (who died before reaching adulthood), Fielding Lewis Jr. (whose financial extravagance disturbed his father and godfather) and Charles Lewis (who also died as a child), whereas Lawrence Lewis' godfather was his uncle Charles Washington, who was also the godfather of his elder brothers Augustine and Warner Lewis. This large brood strained the Lewis family finances, but George Washington helped his youngest nephews. George Lewis received an officer's commission in the Continental Army but resigned it in 1779 following criticism of his performance yet was still able to marry and establish a plantation on land he inherited on the Shenandoah River in western Virginia. Gen. Washington paid for Robert Lewis to attend Andover Academy in Massachusetts and the youth accompanied Martha Washington from Virginia to New York City for her husband's inauguration. Fielding Lewis Jr. sold his inheritance in Frederick County to his half-brother John but continued to experience financial problems and was sent to debtors' prison in Winchester in 1790, with Lawrence Lewis accompanying him to the sentencing.

Meanwhile, Lawrence Lewis married an heiress in Essex County, Susannah Edmonton. However, despite grandmother Mary Ball Washington attending the childbed, Susannah died in 1790 giving birth to their child, who also died.

== Military service ==
Lewis volunteered for service in 1794 to help suppress the Whiskey Rebellion and served as aide-de-camp to General Daniel Morgan, achieving the rank of major.

== Career ==
Washington, after finishing his tenure as president, and following the retirement of his main plantation manager, Lund Washington and an issue with his longtime personal secretary, Tobias Lear, called on several of his nephews to assist him at his Mount Vernon plantation. He sought to employ Lawrence Lewis as a manager, but he could not be found, so Washington employed his youngest brother, Howell Lewis, as one of the new managers. On August 4, 1797, Washington wrote to Lawrence Lewis, inviting him to serve as his part-time personal secretary, unpaid except for room and board for him and a servant.

=== Second marriage and litigation following Washington's death ===
While at Mount Vernon with his brother, Lewis came to know Eleanor "Nelly" Parke Custis, a granddaughter of Martha Dandridge Custis Washington and Daniel Parke Custis. She and her brother, George Washington Parke Custis, had been informally adopted by George and Martha Washington after the 1781 death of their father, John Parke Custis. At Mount Vernon, she acted as the social director, entertaining the many visitors of the former president.

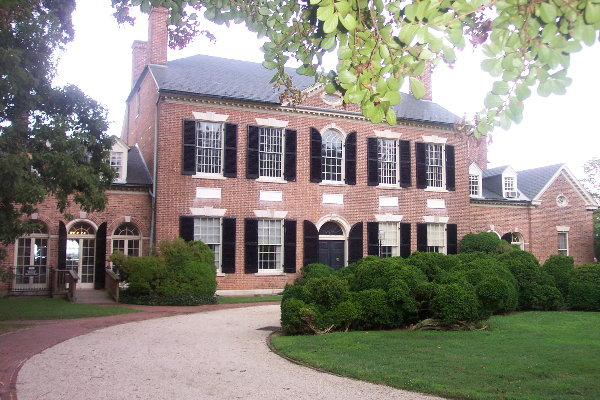
Woodlawn Plantation, Fairfax County, Virginia (1805)

Lewis and Nelly Custis were married at Mount Vernon on February 22, 1799, and resided there for the first several years of their marriage. Their first child, Frances Parke Lewis, was born at Mount Vernon estate on November 27, 1799.

After George Washington's death on December 14, 1799, Lewis learned that he had not inherited Mount Vernon, as he had hoped, only the Woodlawn plantation and Washington's gristmill and distillery, plus become one of the executors of Washington's estate, together with Martha Washington and several of Washington's nephews, including Bushrod Washington who received the Mount Vernon estate. He showed his displeasure by not inviting Bushrod Washington to the post funeral dinner, so the estate's new master had a servant bring him refreshments in an outbuilding and ate alone. Nonetheless, afterward, Lawrence Lewis and Bushrod Washington served as the primary executors of the late President's estate. Lewis eventually begin a "friendly" lawsuit over the will's terms with Bushrod Washington which dragged out for many years.

In 1806 Lawrence Lewis and his brother Robert also began litigation with non-family members over a tract on Accokeek Creek that in 1794 President Washington had offered as a gift to Robert Lewis. Mary Ball, Washington's mother, had bequeathed it to her son George, but Robert consulted an attorney who determined that such conveyance would require consent of all the descendants of Washington's brothers and sister. In 1790 a tavern keeper in Falmouth, Virginia had obtained a patent on the land under the new escheat statute, and in 1795 sold part of it to Henry Suddoth, who was collecting rents from a tenant. The Washington executors in 1803 sold 640 acres to Joseph DeJarnette, who tried to collect rents from Suddoth's tenant, before beginning the litigation Dejarnette v. Suddoth in 1806.

=== Woodlawn ===
As a wedding gift from the Washingtons, the couple had received 2,000 acres (8.1 km^{2}) of the Mount Vernon plantation. From 1800 to 1805, Lewis oversaw the construction of the Woodlawn Plantation, designed by the physician-architect William Thornton.

Lewis and his wife lived at Woodlawn until about 1830, when they moved westward and settled at their new (now historic) Audley estate in what is now Clarke County, Virginia. Lewis had purchased the tract of 571 acres (2.31 km^{2}) from George Washington's extensive real estate holdings.

== Death and legacy ==
Lawrence Lewis outlived Bushrod Washington by a decade. Lewis died in 1839 in Arlington, Virginia, and was buried in the vault at Mount Vernon, close to the sarcophagi of George and Martha Washington.

== Family ==
First married Susannah Edmonton who died in childbirth.

- Baby Lewis (1790), died during birth

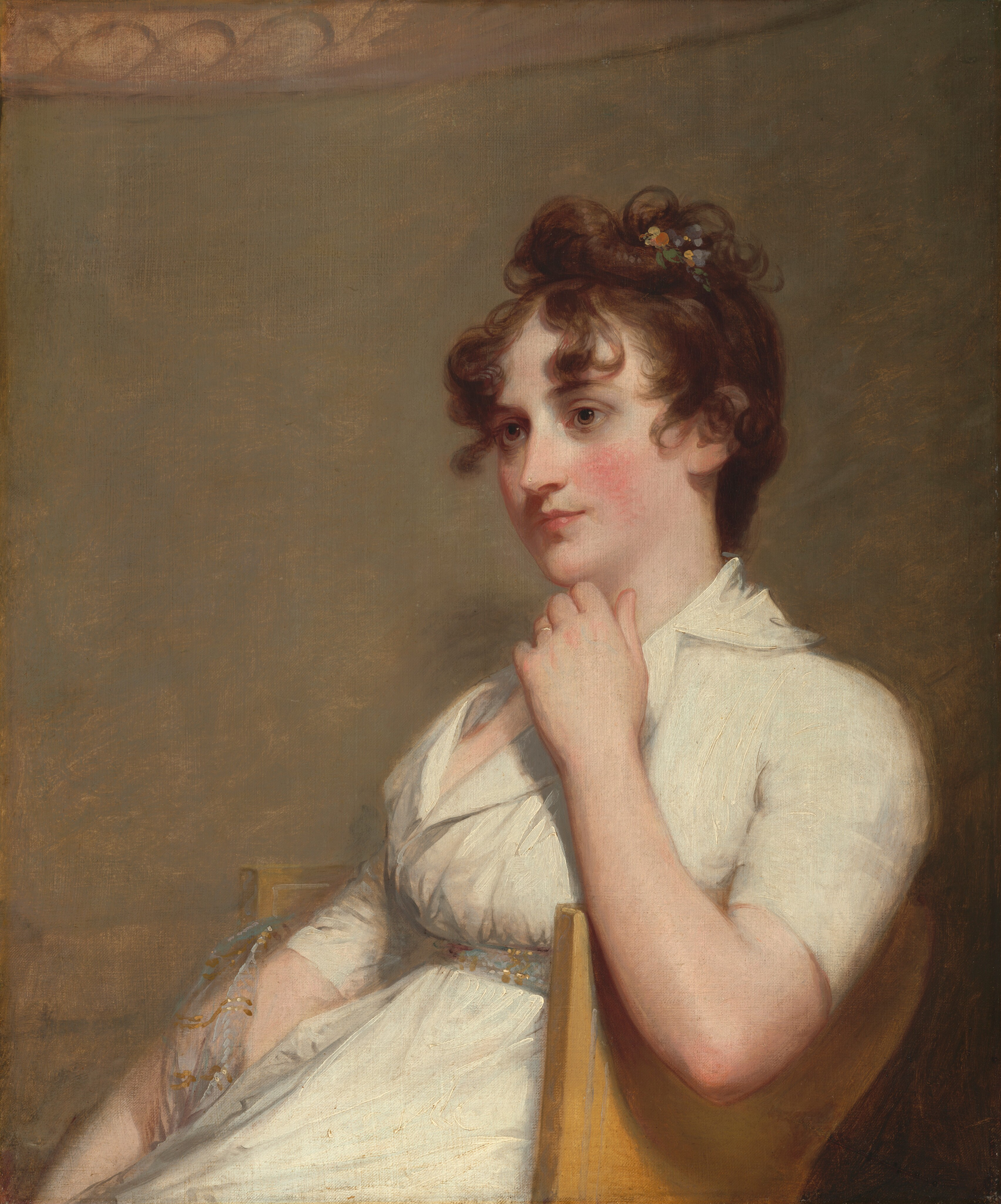
Eleanor Parke Custis Lewis

Secondly married Eleanor "Nelly" Parke Custis. Nelly gave birth to eight children, four of whom lived to adulthood:

- Frances Parke Lewis (1799–1875), married Edward George Washington Butler, nephew of General Richard Butler.
- Martha Betty Lewis (1801–1802), died in infancy
- Lawrence Fielding Lewis (1802–1802), died in infancy
- Lorenzo Lewis (1803–1847), father of Edward Parke Custis Lewis, grandfather of Esther Maria Lewis Chapin.
- Eleanor Agnes Freire Lewis (1805–1820), died unmarried
- Fielding Augustine Lewis (1807–1809), died in childhood
- George Washington Custis Lewis (1810–1811), died in infancy
- Martha Eleanor Angela Lewis Conrad (1813–1839), married Charles Magill Conrad

Eleanor also suffered many miscarriages:

- A miscarriage in 1800.
- A miscarriage in 1804.
- A miscarriage in 1806.
- A miscarriage in 1808.
- A miscarriage in 1809.
- A miscarriage in 1811.
- A miscarriage in 1812.
- A miscarriage in 1814.
