= William Thornton =

American inventor and architect (1759–1828)

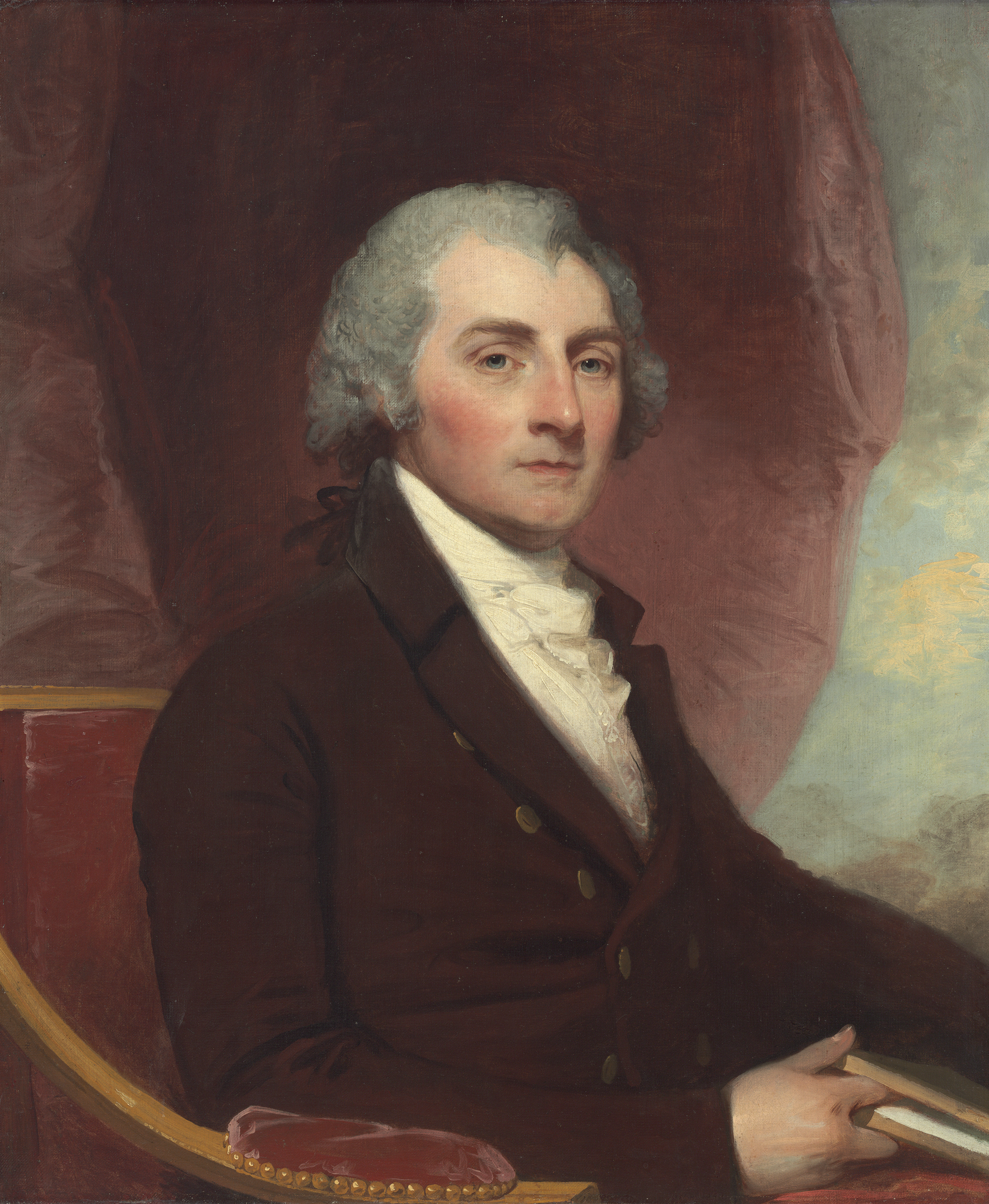
- Portrait by Gilbert Stuart, 1804

Architect of the Capitol
- In office 1793–1802
- President: George Washington; John Adams; Thomas Jefferson
- Preceded by: Position established
- Succeeded by: Benjamin Henry Latrobe

5th Commissioner of the Federal City
- In office September 12, 1794 – July 1, 1802
- Preceded by: David Stuart
- Succeeded by: Office retired

Personal details
- Born: May 20, 1759 Jost Van Dyke, British Virgin Islands
- Died: March 28, 1828 (aged 68) Washington, D.C., U.S.
- Resting place: Congressional Cemetery in Washington, D.C.
- Education: University of Edinburgh; University of Aberdeen
- Profession: Architect
- Known for: United States Capitol
- Awards: Magellanic Premium (1792)

Military service
- Branch/service: District of Columbia Militia
- Years of service: 1807-1815
- Rank: Captain

William Thornton (May 20, 1759 – March 28, 1828) was an American physician, inventor, painter and architect who designed the United States Capitol. He also served as the first Architect of the Capitol and first Superintendent of the United States Patent Office.

== Early life ==
From an early age, William Thornton displayed interest and discernible talent in "the arts of design," to employ an 18th-century term that is particularly useful in assessing his career. Thornton was born on Jost Van Dyke in the British Virgin Islands, West Indies, in a Quaker community. where he was heir to sugar plantations. He was sent to England at age five to be educated. Thornton was brought up strictly by his father's relations, Quakers and merchants, in and near the ancient castle town of Lancaster, in northern Lancashire, England. There was never any question of his pursuing the fine arts professionally—he was to be trained for a useful life, according to the Quaker ways. Thus, despite the fact that he had a sizeable income, young Thornton was apprenticed for a term of four years (1777–1781), to a practical physician and apothecary in Ulverston, Lancashire (now Cumbria).

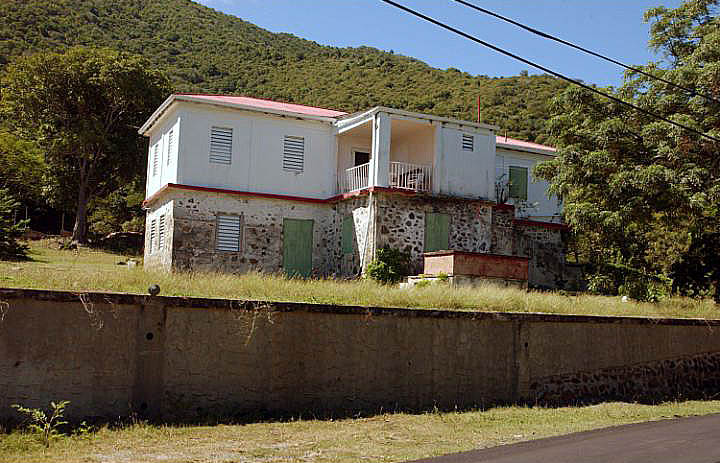
Ruins of the Thornton Plantation at Tortola

The earliest of Thornton's known writings, a journal he began during his apprenticeship, records almost as many entries for drawing and sketching as notes on medical treatments and nostrums. His subjects were most often flora and fauna, but he also did portraits, landscapes, historical scenes, and studies of machinery, such as the Franklin stove, and managed to construct a camera obscura. This pattern continued when he enrolled as a medical student in the University of Edinburgh in 1781. He interned at St Bartholomew's Hospital. The architecture of Edinburgh, especially that of the New Town that was being built, surely exerted considerable influence. More direct evidence of his interest in architecture is found in the landscapes and sketches of castles he drew while travelling about Scotland, notably in the Highlands, during these years.

In 1783, Thornton went to London to continue his medical studies; characteristically, he also found time to attend lectures at the Royal Academy. The following year he was off to the Continent, carrying a letter of introduction to Benjamin Franklin, (1706–1790), written by his mentor and distant cousin John Coakley Lettsome, (1744–1815). In the summer of 1784, he explored the Highlands with French geologist Barthélemy Faujas de Saint-Fond. He received his medical degree in 1784 at the University of Aberdeen in Scotland.

Thornton then spent time in Paris, before returning to Tortola in 1786. There, he saw his mother for the first time since boyhood, where he came face to face with the source of his income—half interest in a sugar plantation and ownership of some 70 slaves, the possession of whom had begun to trouble him.

Eager to achieve fame (and undoubtedly some expiation) in the cause of anti-slavery, he emigrated to the United States of America in the fall of 1786, moving to Philadelphia. His unsuccessful efforts to lead a contingent of free black Americans to join the small British settlement of London blacks at the mouth of the Sierra Leone River in West Africa were looked on favorably by Philadelphia's Quaker establishment. Some leaders of the new republic—notably James Madison, with whom he lodged at Mrs. Mary House's prominent boarding establishment in 1787 and 1788—were cognizant of Thornton's abolitionist activities. However, after moving to the City of Washington, he took advantage of slavery. According to a diary his wife kept in 1800, he frequently shopped for slaves and bought and hired them. In 1788, he became an American citizen. Thornton married Anna Maria Brodeau, daughter of a schoolteacher, in 1790.

== Architect ==
=== United States Capitol ===
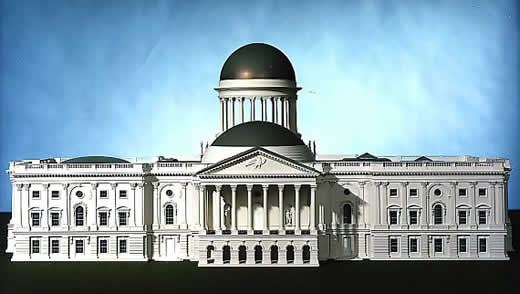
Thornton's original Capitol Building design

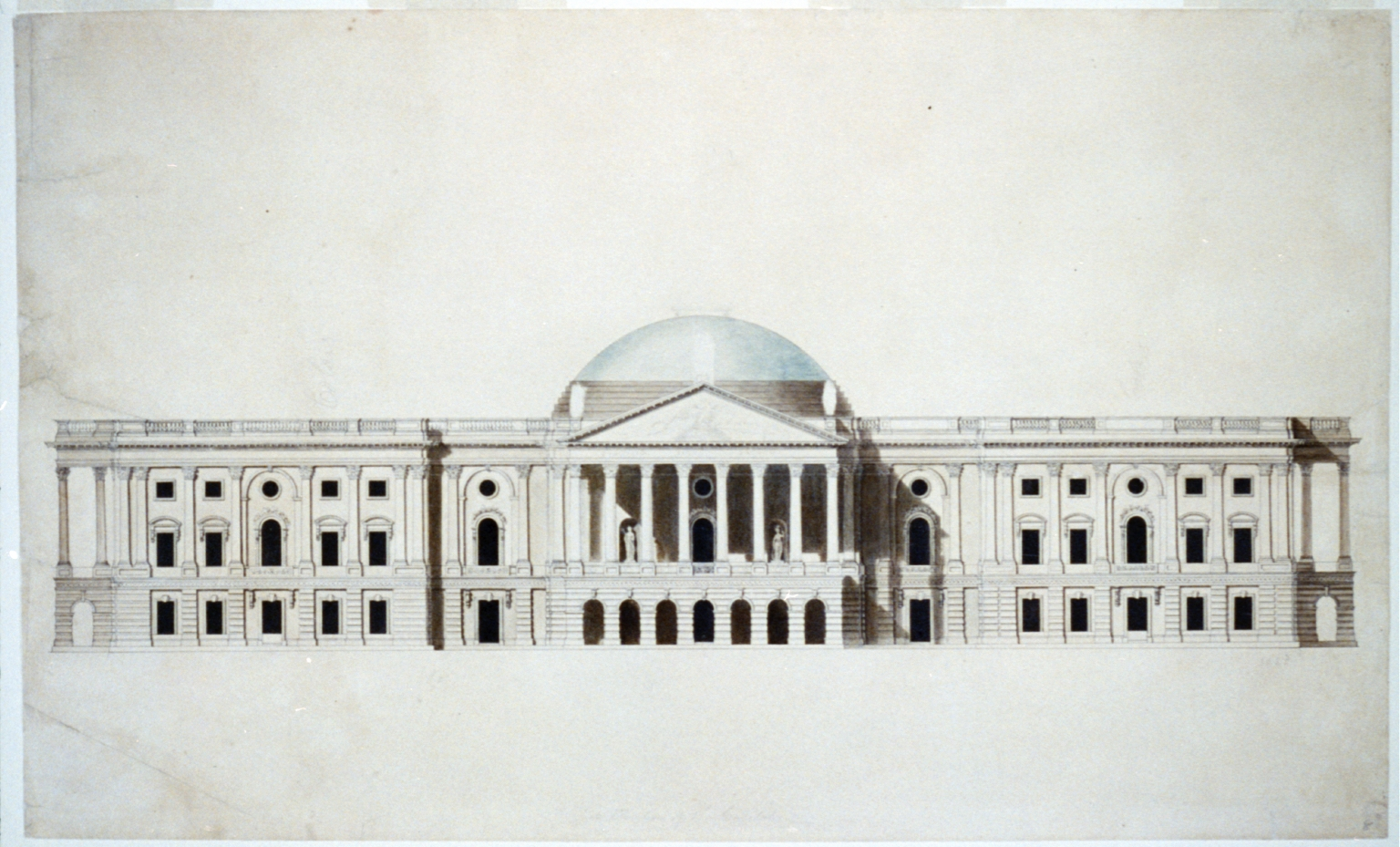
Thornton's submission for the Capitol, officially approved by Washington in 1793

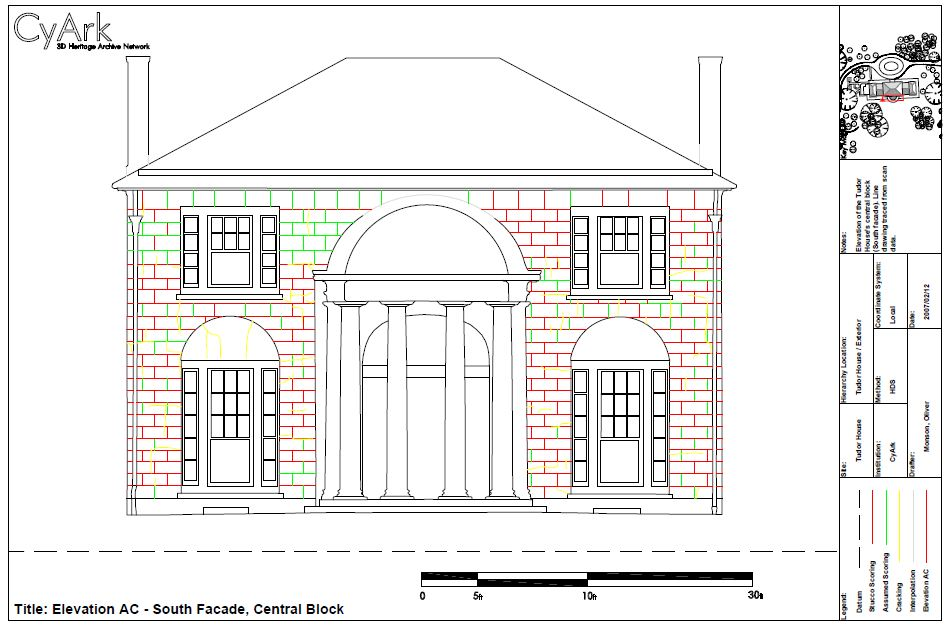
This elevation of the Temple Portico of Tudor Place is from a laser scan project conducted by nonprofit CyArk. The circular Te Portico that extends into the space of the Saloon is a prominent architectural feature of the house, and one of Thornton's trademarks

In 1789, after briefly practicing medicine and pursuing an interest in steamboats, Thornton submitted a design to the architectural competition for the Library Company of Philadelphia's new hall. His design won but was somewhat departed from during actual construction. Library Hall was described as the first building in the "modern [classical] style" to be erected in the new nation's leading city.

During his visit to Tortola between October 1790 and October 1792, Thornton learned of the design competitions for the U.S. Capitol and the "President's House" to be erected in the new Federal City on the banks of the Potomac. Because a design for the Capitol had not been chosen, he was allowed to compete upon his return to Philadelphia. Between July and November 1792, the Washington administration examined closely the designs submitted by the French émigré architect Etienne Sulpice Hallet, (1755-1825), and Judge George Turner. Hallet and Turner had been summoned to the Federal City in August 1792 to present their ideas to the "Commissioners of the District of Columbia" and local landholders. Both were then encouraged to submit revisions of their designs to accommodate new conditions and requirements. At the beginning of November, Turner's new designs were rejected.

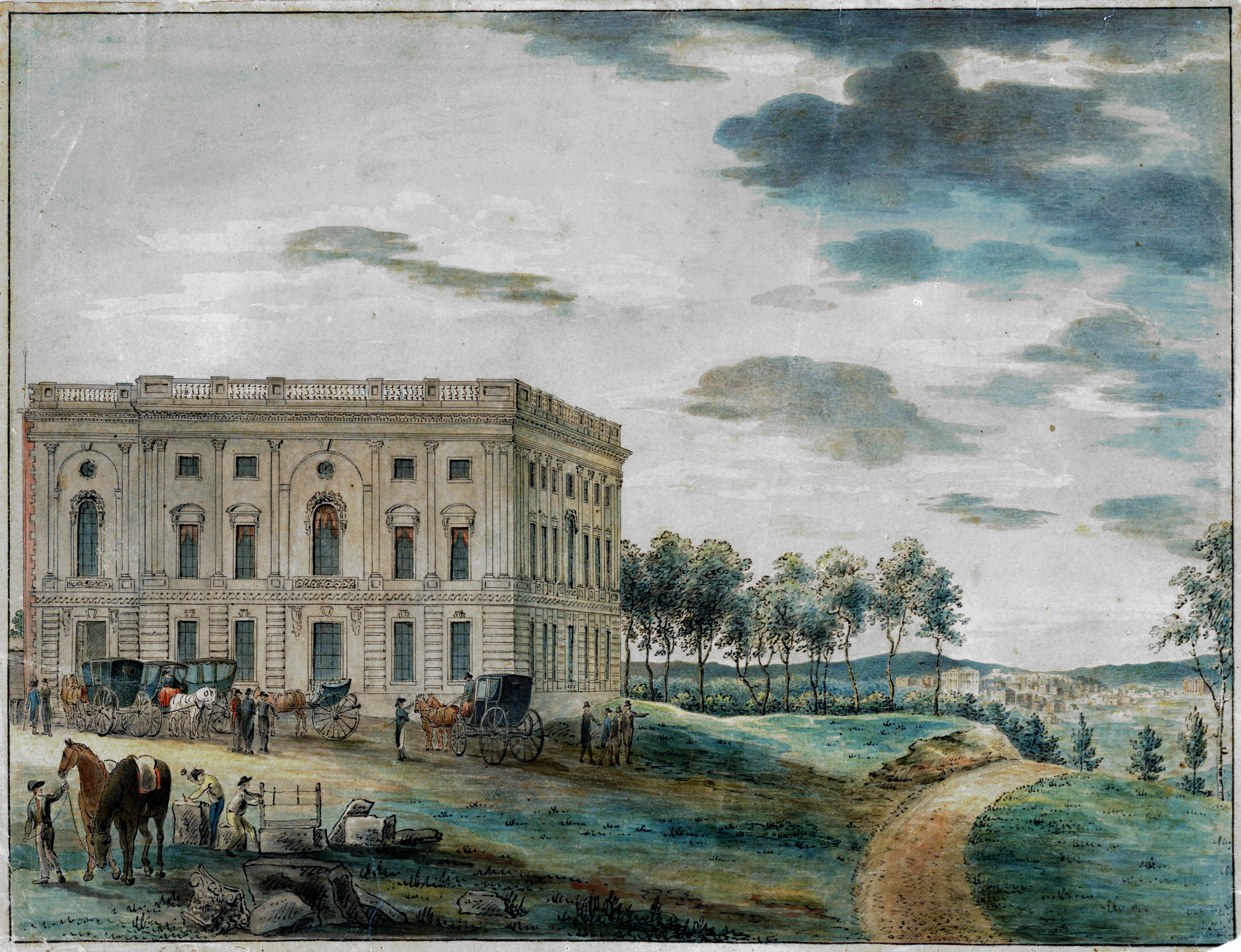
The U.S. Capitol when first occupied by Congress, 1800

The painter John Trumbull handed in William Thornton's still "unfinished" revised plan of the Capitol building on January 29, 1793, but the President's formal approbation was not recorded until April 2, 1793. Thornton was inspired by the east front of the Louvre, former royal palace later turned art museum, as well as the Pantheon, famed former Roman temple in Roma and later converted to a Christian church, for the center portion of the design. After more drawings were prepared, enthusiastic praise of Thornton's design was echoed by Secretary of State Jefferson: "simple, noble, beautiful, excellently distributed." For his winning design, Thornton received a prize of $500 and a city lot.

The execution of the design was entrusted to the supervision of Étienne Sulpice Hallet and James Hoban, (1758-1831), (who had also submitted designs for the "President's House - later the White House). Hallet proceeded to make numerous revisions, including removing the rotunda under which Washington was to be enshrined upon his death. So, on September 12, 1794 the President appointed Thornton as one of the three "Commissioners of the Federal District" in charge of laying out the new federal city and overseeing construction of the first government buildings, including the Capitol of which he became supervisor and remained in charge until 1802. Despite important changes and additions, (especially the substitution of a lower copper-clad wooden dome during the 1820s to 1856, for Thornton's original design), especially by second Architect of the Capitol, Latrobe and third Architect Bulfinch, much of the design of the façade of the central portion of the Capitol is his.

=== Other works ===
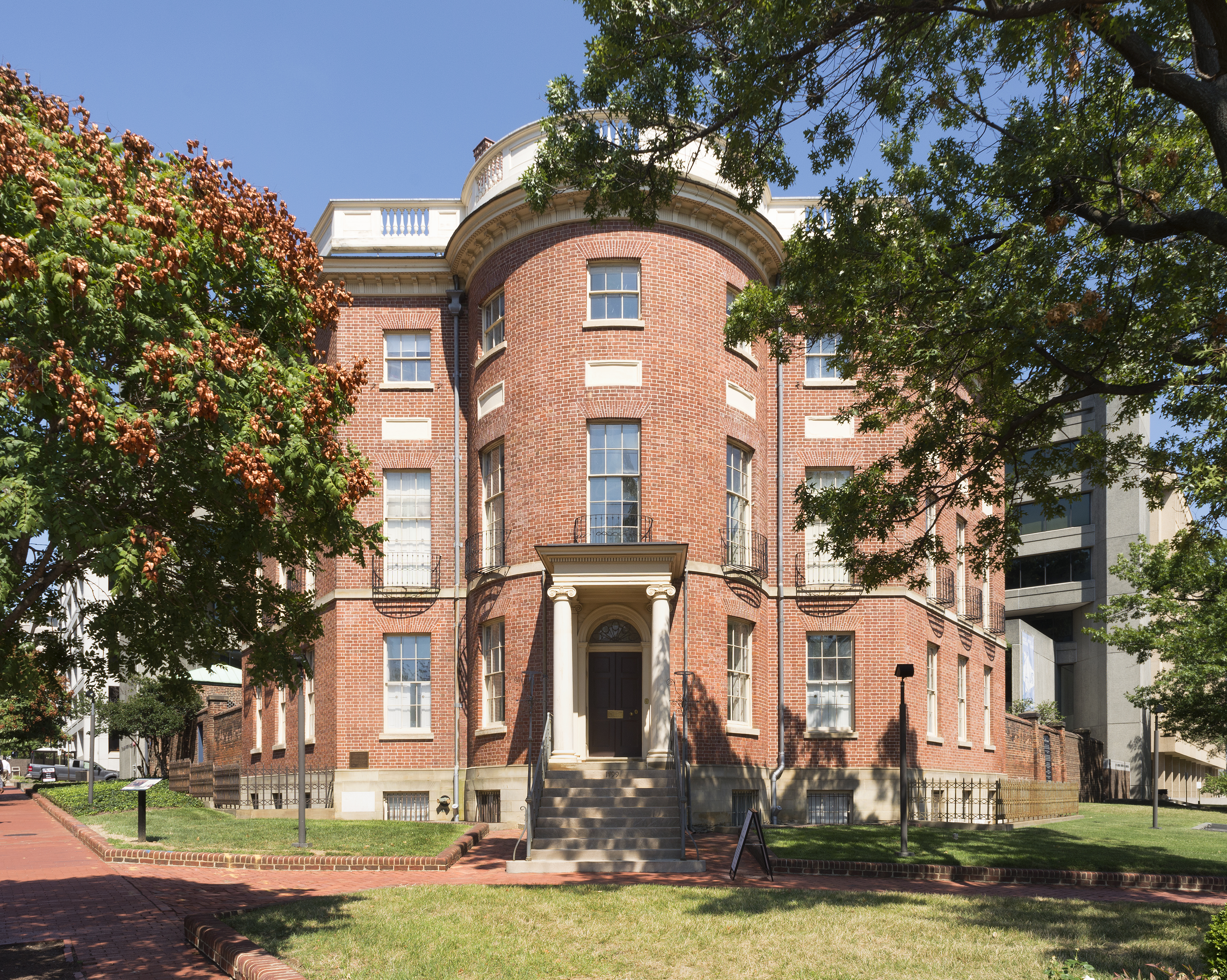
The Octagon House (1800), Washington, DC

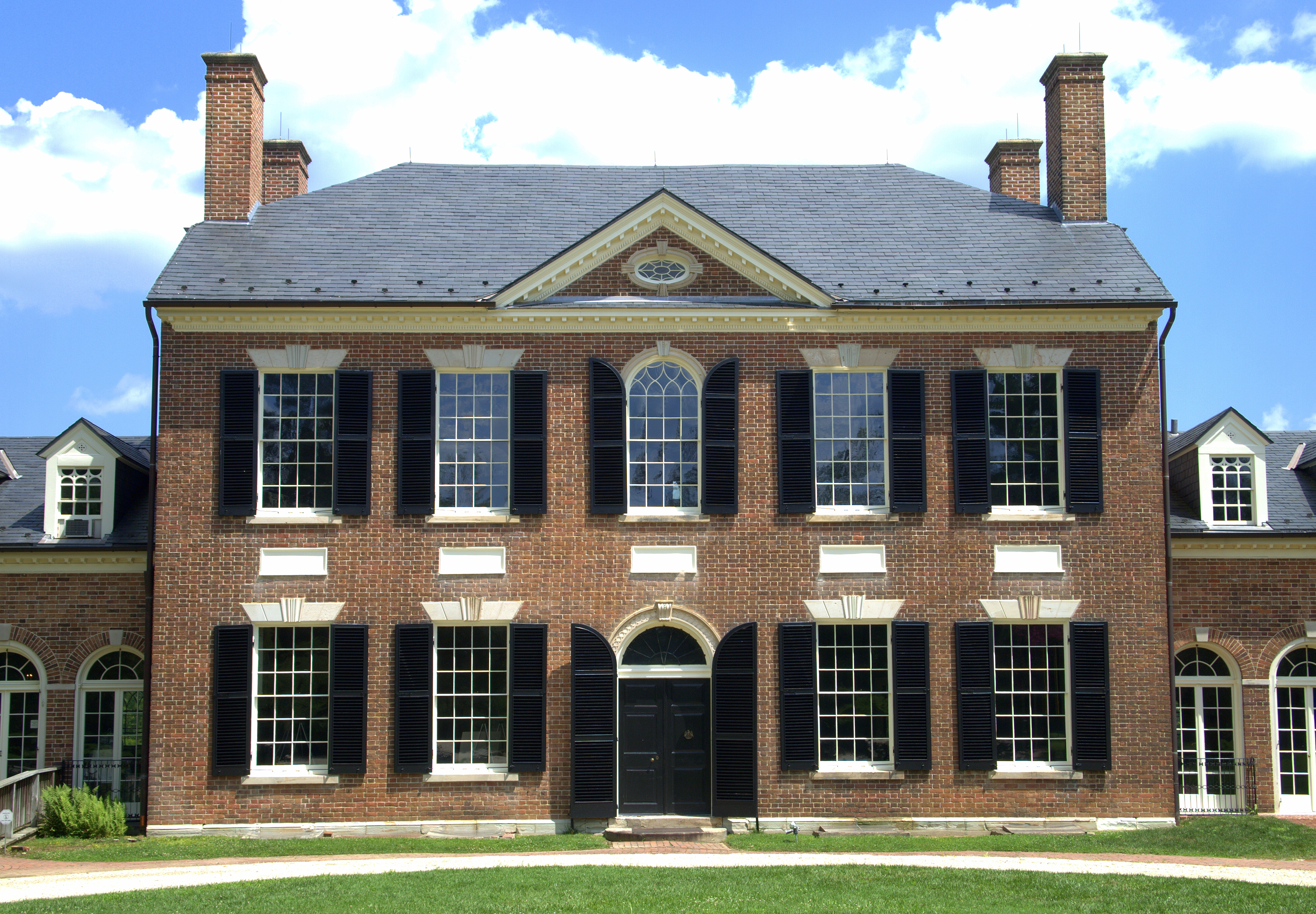
Woodlawn Plantation, Fairfax County, Virginia (1805)

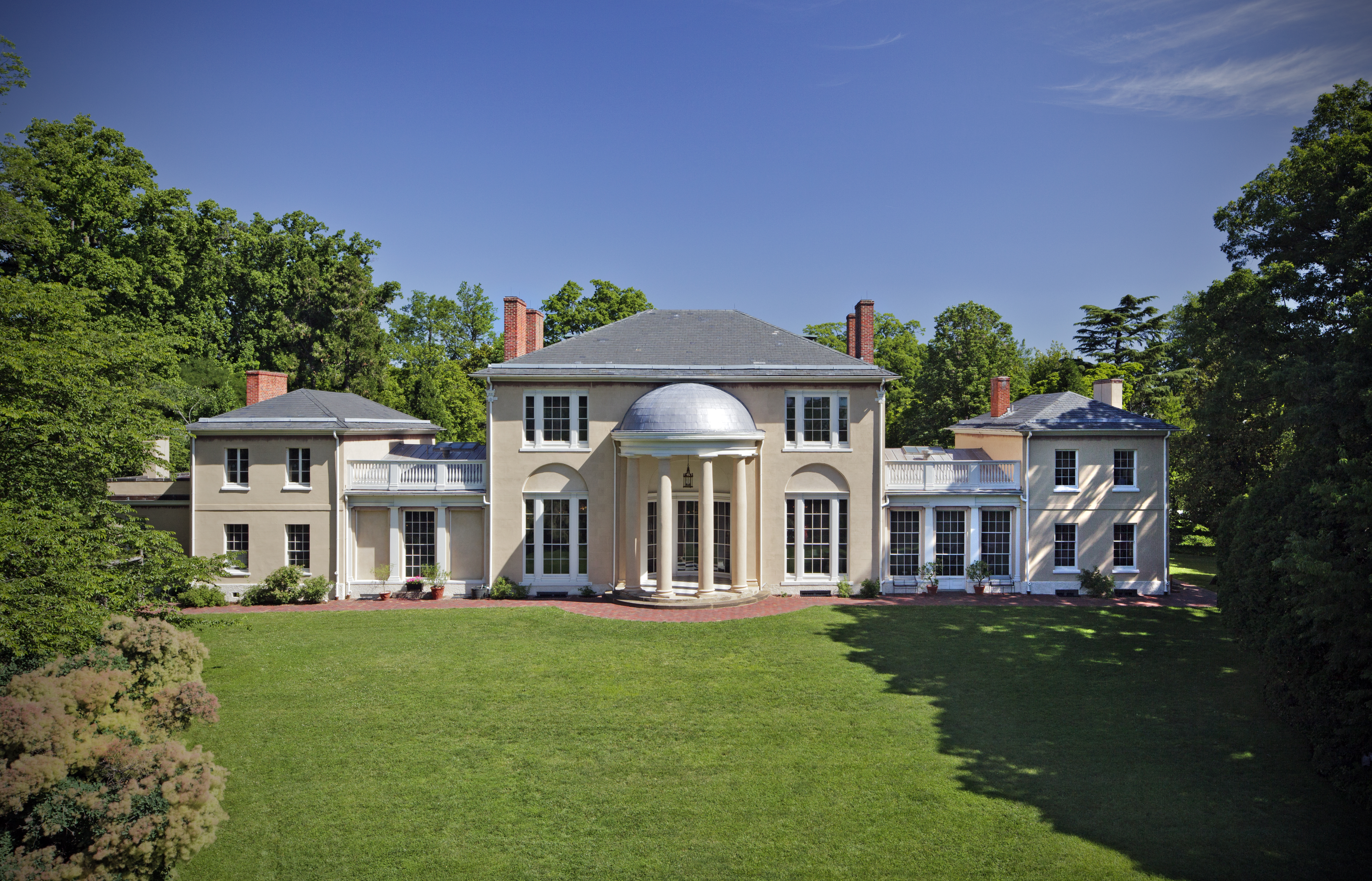
Tudor Place (c.1808), Georgetown, Washington, DC

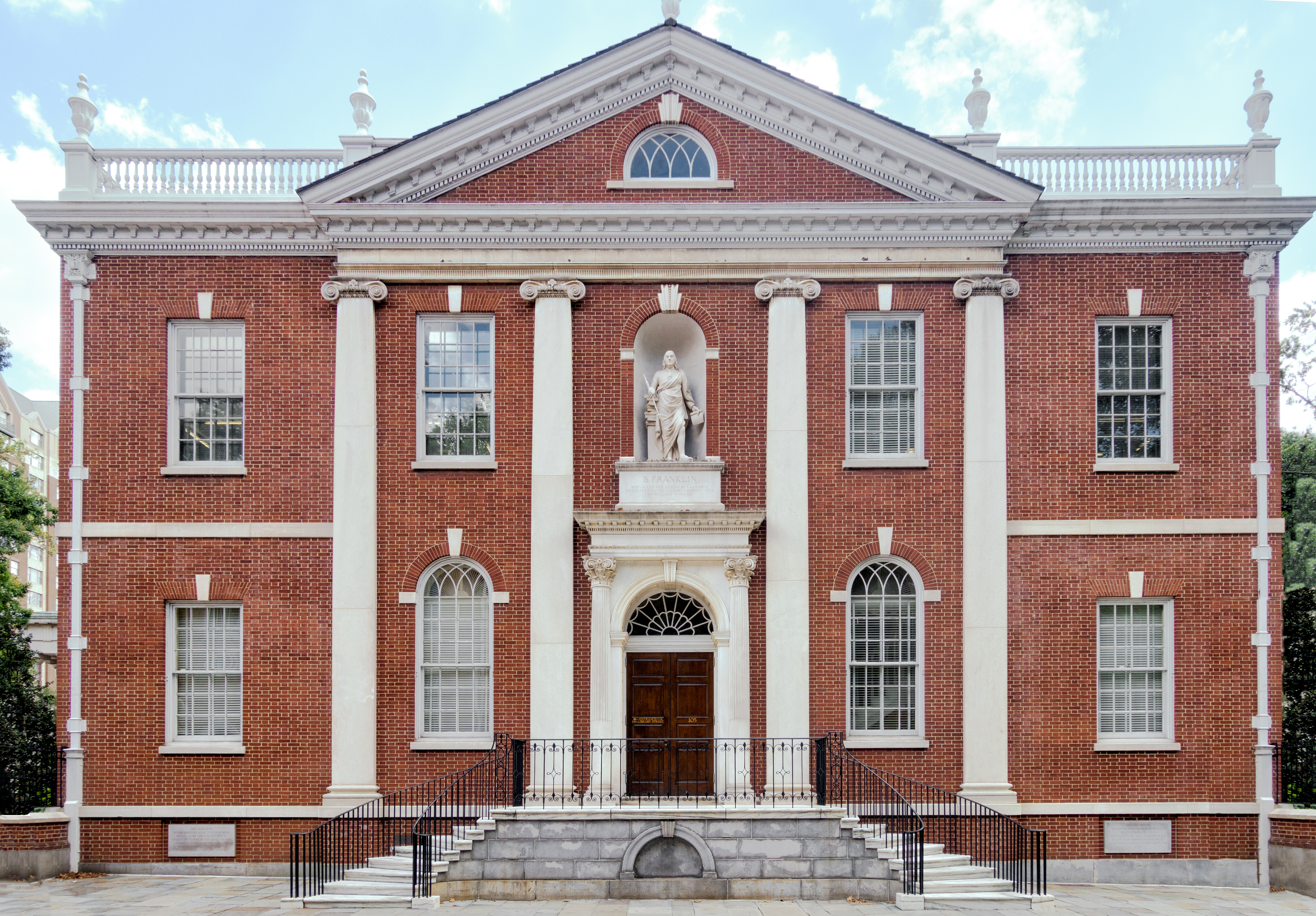
Library Company of Philadelphia (1789, replica constructed 1954), now Library Hall, American Philosophical Society

As a consequence of winning the Capitol competition, Thornton was frequently asked to give ideas for public and residential buildings in the Federal City. He responded with designs on several occasions during his tenure as a commissioner, less so after 1802 when he took on the superintendency of the Patent Office.

It was during this time he was asked to design a mansion for Colonel John Tayloe. The Tayloe House, also known as The Octagon House, in Washington, D.C., was erected between 1799 and 1800. It served as a temporary "Executive Mansion" after the 1814 burning of the White House by the British and the house's study was where President Madison signed the Treaty of Ghent ending the War of 1812. In 1899, the building was acquired by the American Institute of Architects, whose national headquarters now nestles behind it.

Around 1800, he designed Woodlawn for Major Lawrence Lewis (nephew of George Washington) and his wife, Eleanor (Nelly) Parke Custis (granddaughter of Martha Washington), on 2,000 acres (8.1 km^{2}) of Mount Vernon land. Sometime around 1808, he designed Tudor Place for Thomas Peter and his wife, Martha Parke Custis Peter (another granddaughter of Martha Washington).

=== National Register ===
Many buildings designed by Thornton have been added to the National Register of Historic Places including:

- Library Company of Philadelphia, 5th & Chestnut Sts., Philadelphia, PA; 1789 (demolished 1887; recreated as Library Hall, American Philosophical Society, 1954)
- United States Capitol, Washington, D.C.; 1793 - exempt
- Prospect Hill, NE of Long Green on Kanes Road, Baltimore, MD; 1796-1798 - added to registry in 1973
- Prospect House, 3508 Prospect Street NW, Washington, D.C. - added in 1972
- Octagon House, 1741 New York Avenue, NW, Washington, D.C.; 1799 - added in 1966
- Woodlawn, W of jct. of U.S. 1 and Rte. 235, Fairfax, VA, 1800-05 - added in 1970
- Tudor Place, 1644 31st Street, NW, Washington, D.C.; 1816 - added in 1966

== Founding of the Washington Jockey Club ==
Portrait miniature by Robert Field, c. 1800

In 1802, the Club sought a new site for its track, which at the time lay at the rear of what is now the site of Decatur House at H Street and Jackson Place, crossing Seventeenth Street and Pennsylvania Avenue to Twentieth Street (today the Eisenhower Executive Office Building) was being overtaken by the growth of the Federal City. With the leadership of John Tayloe III and Charles Carnan Ridgely and support of Gen. John Peter Van Ness, William Thornton, G.W. P. Custis, John D. Threlkeld of Georgetown and George Calvert of Riversdale, Bladensburg, Maryland, the contests were moved to a new site near Meridian Hill, north of Columbia Road at Fourteenth Street, between present-day Eleventh and Sixteenth Streets. Thornton designed this new track, one mile in circumference, and named it the Washington City Race Course. It sat on land leased from the Holmead family, and lasted until the mid-1840s.

== Superintendent of the Patent Office ==
Upon the abolition of the board of Commissioners of the Federal City in 1802, President Jefferson appointed Thornton the first Superintendent of the Patent Office. When Washington was burned by the British in 1814, Thornton convinced them not to burn the Patent Office because of its importance to mankind. It is written that a loaded cannon was aimed at the patent office to destroy it. Thornton "put himself before the gun, and in a frenzy of excitement exclaimed: 'Are you Englishmen or only Goths and Vandals? This is the Patent Office, a depository of the ingenuity of the American nation, in which the whole civilized world is interested. Would you destroy it? If so, fire away, and let the charge pass through my body.' The effect is said to have been magical upon the soldiers, and to have saved the Patent Office from destruction." He held the position from June 1, 1802, until his death in 1828 in Washington, DC. During his tenure, he introduced innovations including the patent reissue practice, which survives to this day.

Some of Thornton's reputation as an inventor is due to abuse of his position in the Patent Office. His improvements to John Fitch's 1788 steamboat are patented but didn't work. When John Hall applied for a patent on a new breech-loading rifle in 1811, Thornton claimed he had also invented it. As proof, he showed Hall a Ferguson rifle, a British gun dating from 1776, refusing to issue the patent unless it was in his name as well as Hall's name.

== Societies ==
In 1787, Thornton was elected to the American Philosophical Society. During the 1820s, Thornton was a member of the prestigious society, Columbian Institute for the Promotion of Arts and Sciences, who counted among their members former presidents Andrew Jackson and John Quincy Adams and many prominent men of the day, including well-known representatives of the military, government service, medical and other professions.

== Later life ==
In the 1820s, Thornton wrote of having been summoned to Mount Vernon in December 1799, in the hopes that he would be able to treat George Washington, but of having arrived after Washington's death; as a result, he devised a plan to resurrect Washington's frozen corpse by

(f)irst to thaw him in cold water, then to lay him in blankets, & by degrees & by friction to give him warmth, and to put into activity the minute blood vessels, at the same time to open a passage to the Lungs by the Trachaea, and to inflate them with air, to produce an artificial respiration, and to transfuse blood into him from a lamb.

Thornton's plan was rejected, however, despite "there (being) no doubt in (Thornton's) mind that (Washington's) restoration was possible."

Thornton died in 1828 and was buried in Congressional Cemetery in eastern Washington, DC.

== See also ==
- Richard Humphreys (philanthropist)
- John C. Lettsome
