= Étienne Sulpice Hallet =

French-born U.S. architect

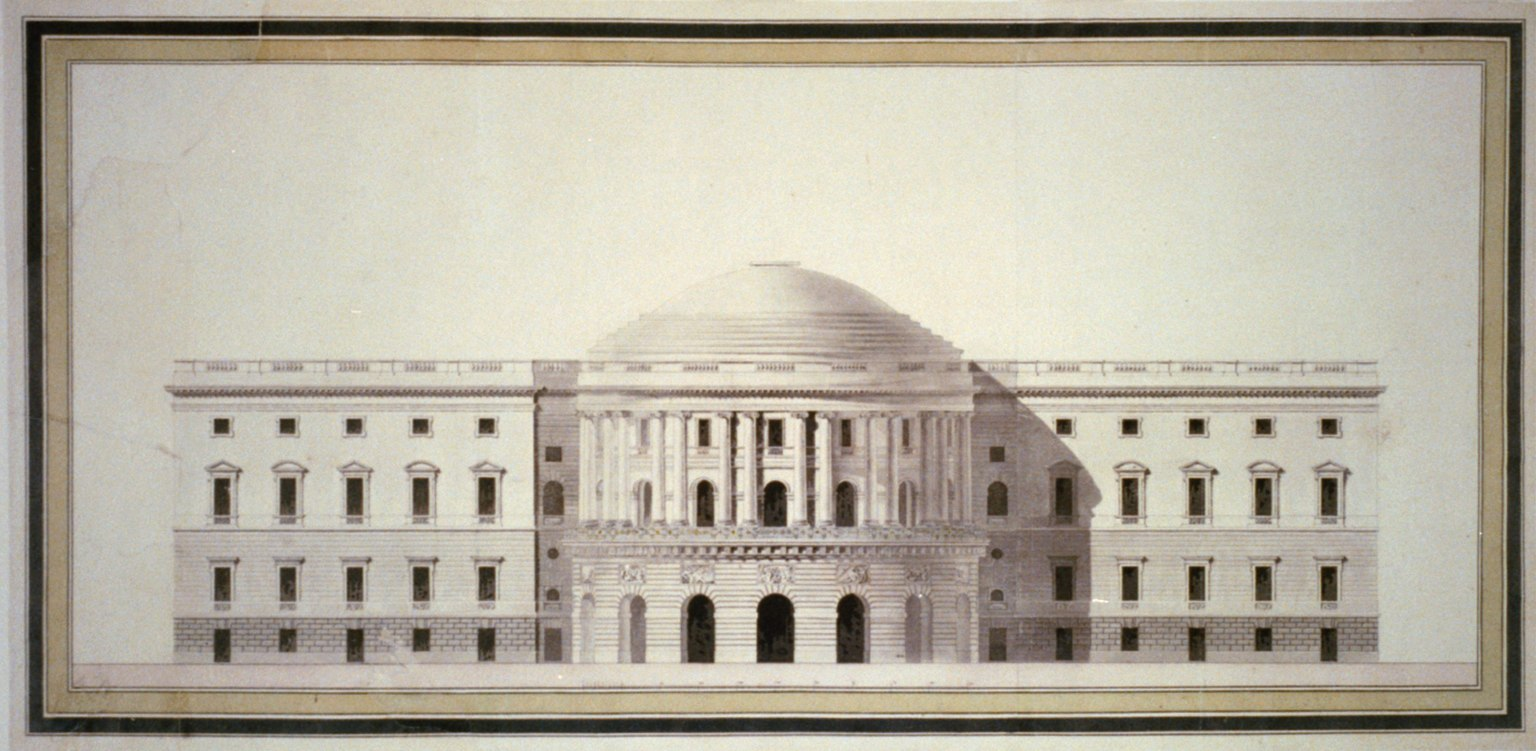
- Occupation: Architect

Étienne Sulpice Hallet (1755–1825) was a French architect.

Around 1789, Hallet went to the United States. There he became known as Stephen Hallet. He worked as Pierre L'Enfant's draftsman.

Hallet submitted plans for the future Capitol in Washington, D.C. in form of a giant dome to Thomas Jefferson. However, the design of William Thornton was favored in 1793. Hallet then worked as supervisor for Thornton, until he was dismissed.

He established a school of architecture in 1796, but the school disappeared after 1797. Hallet travelled to Havana and New York City but he did not appear to be working on any major projects. He died in 1825.
