= Anna Thornton =

American diarist (c.1775–1865)

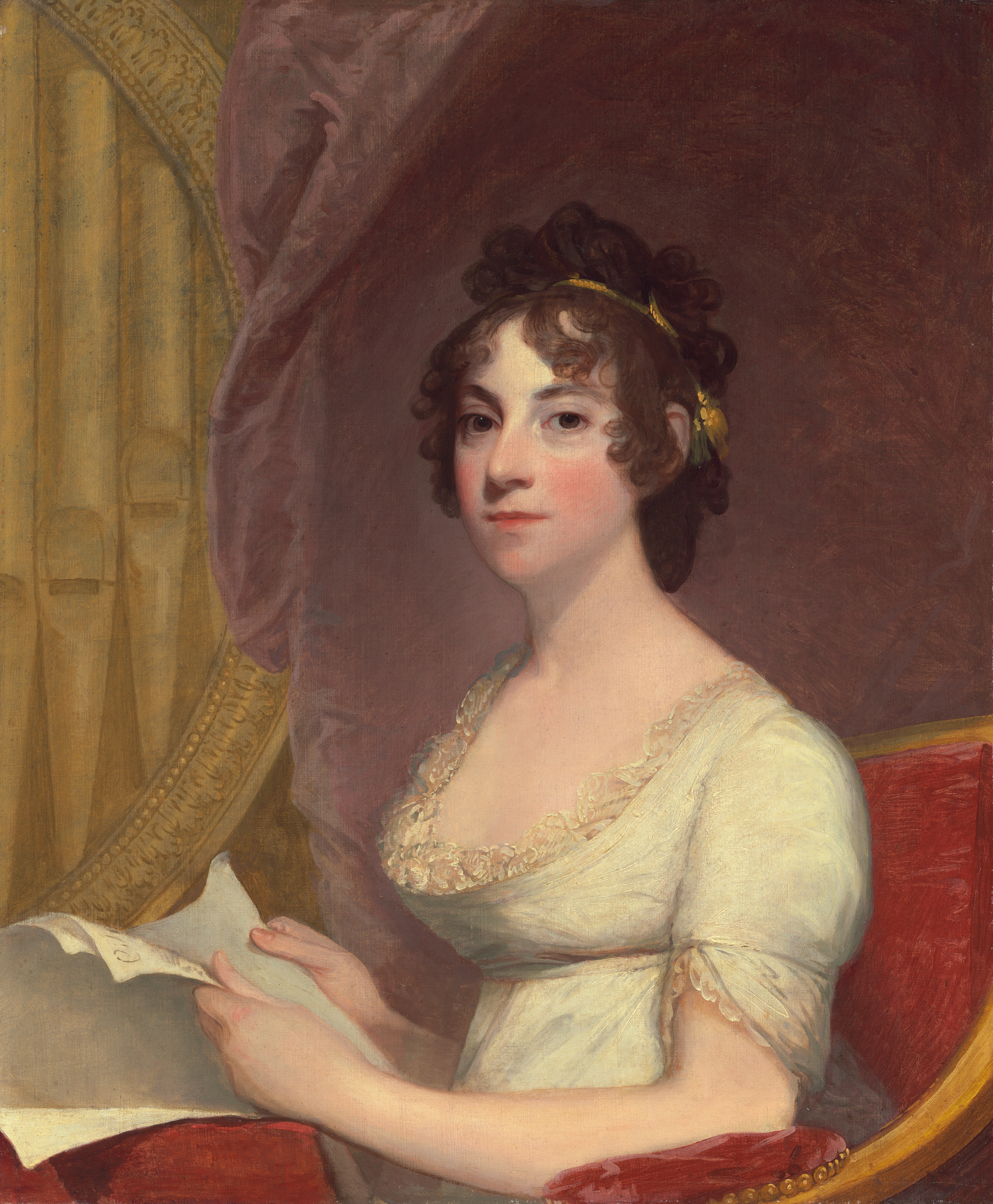
- Portrait by Gilbert Stuart
- Born: 1775?
- Died: 1865

Anna Maria Brodeau Thornton (c.1775–1865) was a Washington, D.C., socialite, diarist, and the wife of architect William Thornton, who designed the first United States Capitol building. She rubbed shoulders with figures such as George Washington and Dolley Madison.

== Life ==
Anna Maria may have been born in England and emigrated along with her mother, Ann Brodeau, or she was born in Philadelphia where her mother set up a girls' boarding school by the end of 1775. In 1790, at the age of 16, Anna Maria married William Thornton, age 31 years. Unlike her husband, Anna Maria was not a Quaker, so William was expelled from the Society of Friends. William Thornton came from a slaveholding family based on the island of Tortola, and after he died in 1828, though his will seemed to grant freedom to his slaves, his wife and mother-in-law continued to reside with slaves in their Washington, D.C. home.

== Historic events ==
Thornton's diaries are kept in the Library of Congress and have been used as a source concerning several historic events.

After the death of George Washington, Mrs. Thornton lobbied Congress on behalf of her friend Martha Washington, concerning the planned re-burial of the former president in Washington, D.C. She met with Abigail Adams three days after the new president and first lady moved to Washington. She recorded the movements of Dolley Madison during the 1814 burning of Washington.

== Bowen incident ==
One night in 1835, one of her slaves, John Arthur Bowen (possibly under the influence of alcohol), ventured into the bedroom of Anna Maria Thornton, then about 60, wielding an axe. Anna and her mother, who shared her room, both escaped unscathed. However, Bowen was arrested and faced the possibility of hanging. In response to the abortive attack, white residents of Washington started the Snow Riot, burning a black school amid other acts of destruction. The capital's restrictive "black codes" were also tightened in response to the incident.

Despite Bowen's threat to her life, Anna Maria Brodeau Thornton was tormented by his imprisonment – especially after he wrote her a letter about awful jail conditions (this letter is still in the Anna Maria Brodeau Thornton papers at the Library of Congress) and went to extraordinary lengths to try to get him pardoned. Her diary chronicles how she appealed to many powerful Washington men at the time, such as Congressman and future Vice President Richard Mentor Johnson, whose common-law wife was herself enslaved. She also appealed to military men such as Gen. George Gibson, former Quartermaster General, who was a close personal friend of President Andrew Jackson, and to a member of the Washington family. The widow Thornton presented a petition signed by numerous Washington notables to President Jackson, in person, and he acted on it on the symbolic date of July 4th, 1836, releasing Bowen from confinement. Thornton immediately sold Bowen to John Henry Eaton to work on a flatboat in Florida.

In her petition to Jackson, Thornton consistently described Bowen as a "boy," though he was about 19, and she speculated that he had been under the influence of drink. In other words, he had not "really" attacked her; it was not him doing the acting, but merely the "demon rum." The modern writer Jefferson Morley has suggested that the sale of Bowen was meant to get him out of Washington, where many angry whites still hated him for his alleged violence and his criticisms of slavery. Morley also notes the possibility that Thornton was so forgiving and protective of the young slave because he may have been William Thornton's son.

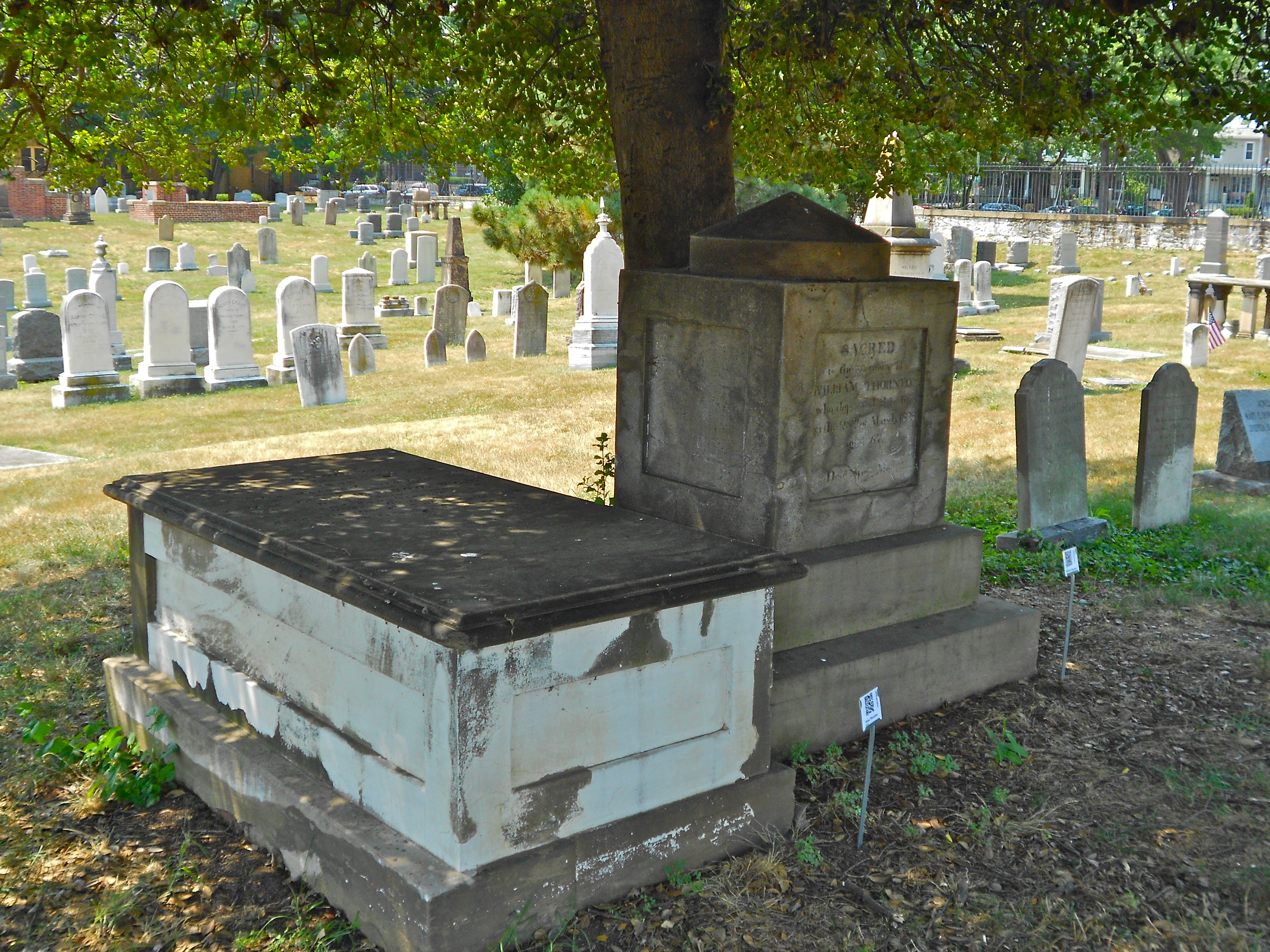
Graves of Anna (left) and William Thornton at the Congressional Cemetery.

After Bowen's release from jail and subsequent sale, Anna Maria Brodeau Thornton went about her daily life, finally freeing her few remaining slaves shortly before her death in 1865 (in which year they would have been freed, anyway, with the end of the American Civil War). Her diary, which is a rich source of information about social life in Washington, D.C., in the late 18th and early-to-mid-19th centuries, is available at the Library of Congress. Her petition to Andrew Jackson is stored in the Andrew Jackson papers at the Library of Congress.
