= Esther Maria Lewis Chapin =

American socialite

- Born: June 17, 1871; Geneva, Switzerland
- Died: June 21, 1959 (aged 88); Bernardsville, New Jersey, US
- Spouse: Charles Merrill Chapin (m. 1894)
- Children: 2
- Parent(s): Edward Parke Custis Lewis; Mary Picton Stevens Garnett

Esther Maria "Lili" Lewis Chapin (June 17, 1871 – June 21, 1959) was an American socialite. She was a direct descendant of Elizabeth Washington Lewis, the sister of George Washington. An evening gown she wore in 1888 set a world auction record when it sold in 2001.

== Early life ==
Esther Maria Lewis was born in Geneva, Switzerland in 1871 and was raised in Hoboken, New Jersey. Her father was Colonel Edward Parke Custis Lewis (1837-1892), who served as United States Minister to Portugal under President Grover Cleveland from 1885 to 1889. Her mother was Mary Picton Stevens (1840-1903), daughter of Edwin Augustus Stevens and formerly the wife of Muscoe Russell Hunter Garnett. Her paternal great-grandparents were Lawrence Lewis, a nephew of George Washington, and Eleanor Parke Custis Lewis, a granddaughter of Martha Washington.

== Debut ==
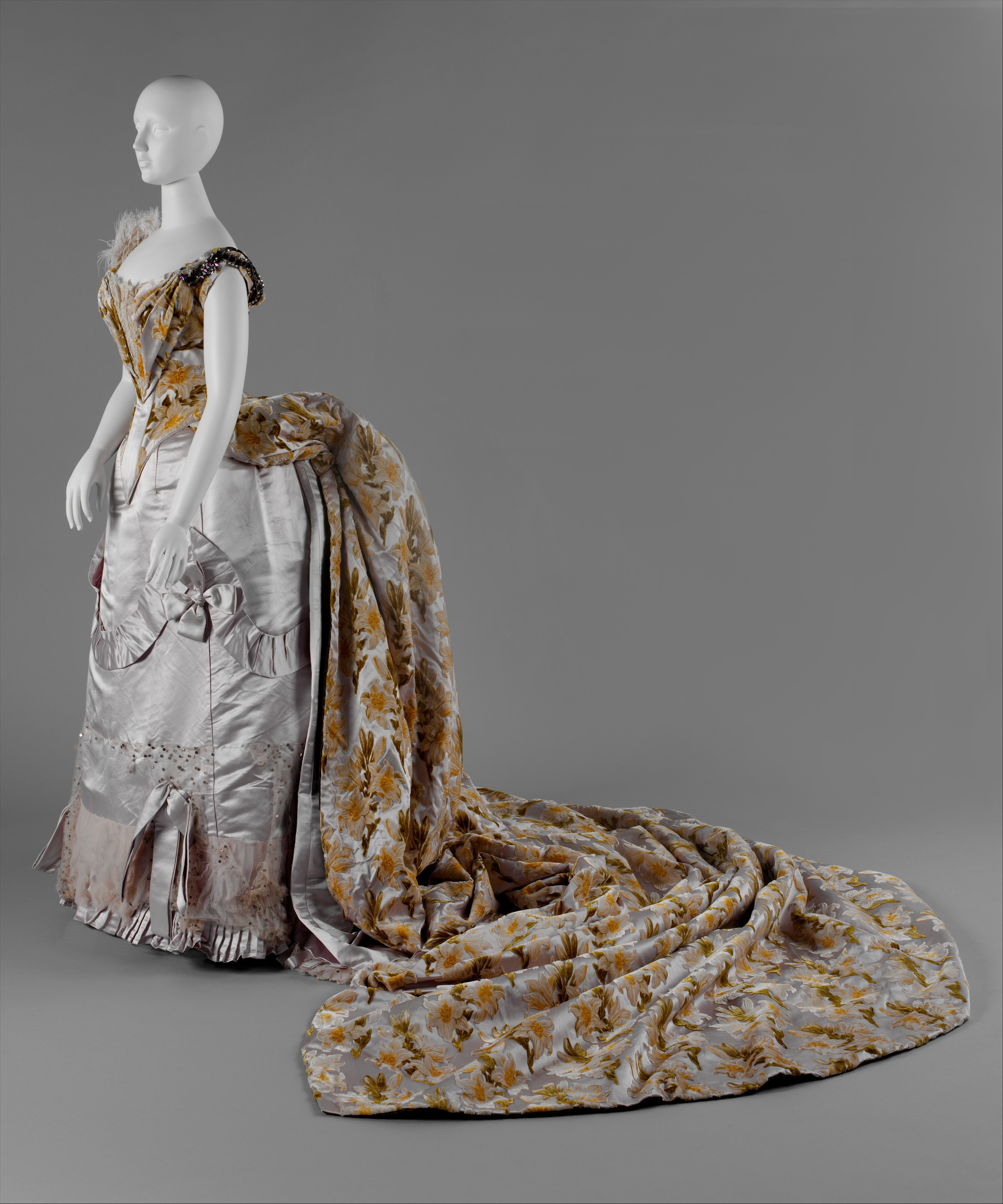
A different court presentation gown from the House of Worth worn by Esther Chapin, in the collection of the Metropolitan Museum of Art

In 1888, at the age of 17 or 18, while her father was serving as Minister to Portugal, she was presented to Queen Victoria wearing a gown designed by Charles Frederick Worth, the world's first couturier. On May 29, 2001, the gown, which has a 23-inch waist and a 10½-foot detachable train, was sold at the Doyle New York auction for $101,500, at the time a world auction record for an antique dress.

After her father's diplomatic tenure ended in 1889, the family returned to their Hoboken home.

== Personal life ==
On May 19, 1894, Esther Maria Lewis married Charles Merrill Chapin at Trinity Church in Hoboken. They had two children:

- Mary Stevens Chapin (born November 10, 1895)
- Charles Merrill Chapin, Jr. (born May 27, 1898).

In 1959, Lewis died in Bernardsville, New Jersey at the age of 88.
