= Otis Tufton Mason =

American ethnologist (1838–1908)

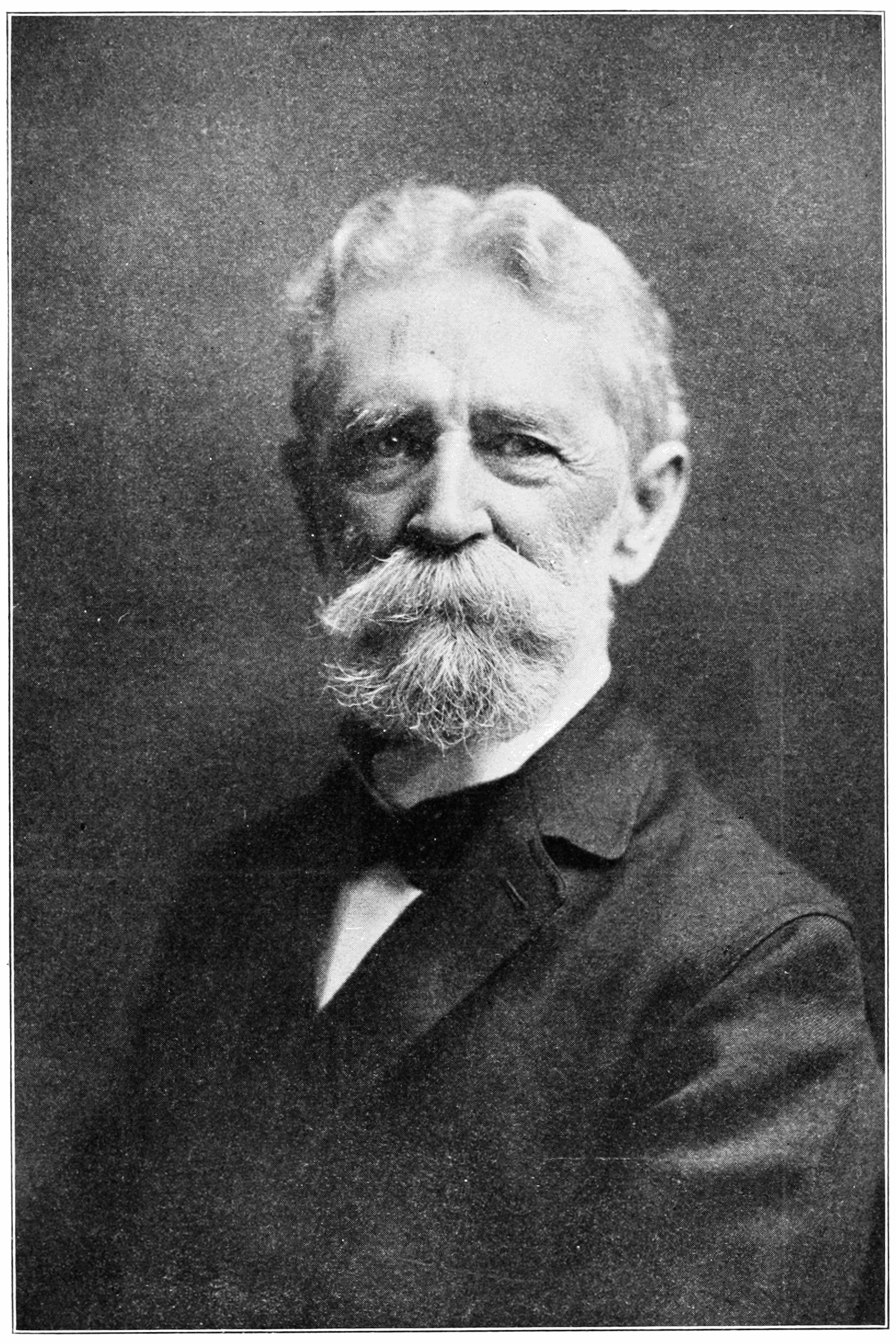

Otis Tufton Mason, Ph.D., LL.D. (April 10, 1838 – November 5, 1908) was an American ethnologist and Smithsonian Institution curator.

== Biography ==
Mason was born on April 10, 1838, in Eastport, Maine, the son of John and Rachel Mason. In 1850, the Masons purchased Woodlawn Plantation, the former home of George Washington's adopted daughter Nellie Custis and her descendants. Otis Mason gave a portion of the property in 1872 to establish the Woodlawn Baptist Church, and preached there for the first four years, until a minister was appointed.

He graduated from Columbian University in 1861, then worked there for 23 years, as principal of the college's preparatory school (1861–84). He first became affiliated with the United States National Museum in 1872, working as a collaborator in ethnology. This in 1884 turned into a full-time position as curator. The Smithsonian had recently built its first purpose-built museum building, the U.S. National Museum building (or Arts and Industries Building). Mason worked closely with George Brown Goode in the installation and reorganization of the museum collections that came with the move into that new building. In 1879, he was one of the founders of the Anthropological Society of Washington, and authored its constitution.

In 1890, Mason was appointed by President Benjamin Harrison to the newly created Board on Geographic Names in Executive Order No. 28, representing the Smithsonian Institution. In 1893, he with Frederic Ward Putnam, head of Harvard's Peabody Museum of American Archaeology and Ethnology, and Sol Bloom oversaw the cultural and anthropological display of the Midway Plaisance at the World's Columbian Exposition. He was elected to the American Philosophical Society in 1899.

As part of his curation work at the Smithsonian, Mason developed the culture area concept. Mason was anthropological editor of the American Naturalist and of the Standard Dictionary. He believed in Gustav Klemm's step-wise evolution of cultures and that technology was a marker of a culture's stage of development.

== Selected publications ==
- Otis Tufton Mason, "Aboriginal American basketry: studies in a textile art without machinery," Annual Report of the Smithsonian Institution for the Year Ending June 30, 1902, Report of the U.S. National Museum, Part II (Washington: Government Printing Office, 1904), pp. 171–548.
- Otis Tufton Mason, The Origins of Invention: A Study of Industry Among Primitives Peoples (London: W. Scott, Ltd., 1895).
- Otis Tufton Mason, Summaries of Progress in Anthropology; Woman's Share in Primitive Culture (New York, D. Appleton and company 1894).
