= Edward Parke Custis Lewis =

American politician (1837-1892)

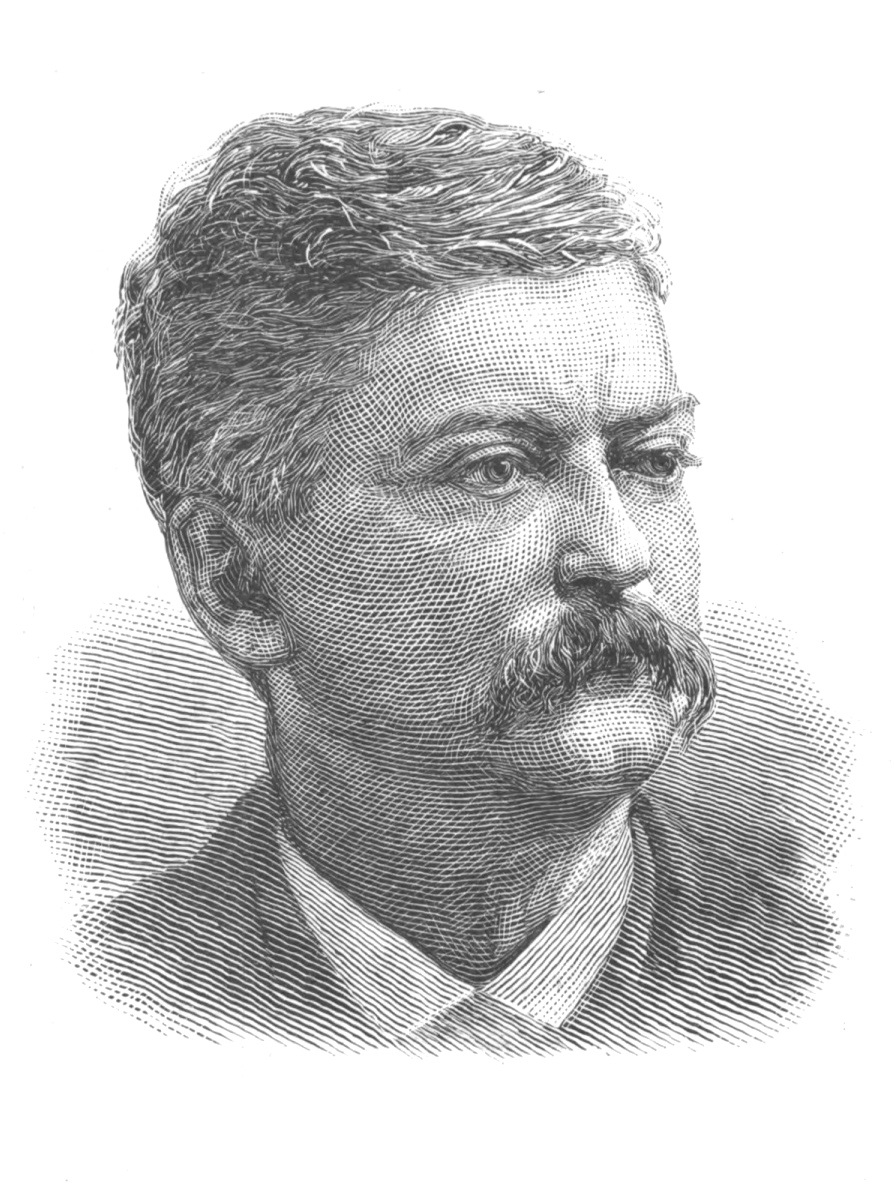

United States Minister to Portugal
- In office April 2, 1885 – June 14, 1889
- President: Grover Cleveland
- Preceded by: Lewis Richmond
- Succeeded by: George B. Loring

Member of the New Jersey General Assembly from Hudson Co.
- In office 1878–1878

Personal details
- Born: February 7, 1837 Audley, Clarke County, Virginia, US
- Died: September 3, 1892 (aged 55) Hoboken, New Jersey, US
- Party: Democratic
- Spouses: Lucy Balmain Ware (m. 1858; died 1866) Mary Picton Stevens Garnett (m. 1869)
- Relations: Lawrence Lewis (grandfather); Eleanor Parke Custis Lewis (grandmother)
- Children: 9, including Esther
- Parent(s): Lorenzo Lewis; Esther Maria Cox
- Education: University of Virginia
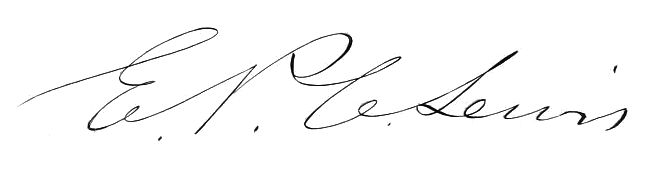
- Signature

Edward Parke Custis Lewis (February 7, 1837 – September 3, 1892) was a Confederate Army colonel, lawyer, legislator, and diplomat who served as United States Minister to Portugal from 1885 to 1889.

== Early life ==
Lewis was born at Audley, his family's plantation in Clarke County, Virginia, in 1837. He was a son of Lorenzo Lewis (1803–1847) and Esther Maria (née Cox) Lewis (1804–1885). His siblings included George Washington Lewis (1829–1885), Lawrence Fielding Lewis (1834–1857), John Redman Coxe Lewis (1834–1898), and Henry Llewellyn Dangerfield Lewis (1841–1893).

Lewis's paternal grandparents were Lawrence Lewis, a nephew of George Washington, and Eleanor Parke Custis Lewis, a granddaughter of Martha Washington. His maternal grandparents were Dr. John Redman Coxe, a Philadelphia physician who was a pioneer in vaccination, and Sarah Cox, whose sister Rachel Cox married the inventor John Stevens.

Lewis was educated at the University of Virginia and studied law, but pursued life as a planter at his Virginia estate.

== Career ==
During the Civil War, he joined the Confederate States Army, eventually rising to the rank of colonel. He served as aide-de-camp under General John R. Chambliss and as brigade inspector under General William Henry Fitzhugh Lee (his second cousin, since Lee's maternal grandfather, George Washington Parke Custis, was his great-uncle). He was captured and made prisoner of war twice, confined for a total of fifteen months at Fort Delaware and Camp Chase. After the war, he returned to his Virginia plantation.

After the death of his first wife in 1866, he moved to Hoboken, New Jersey and opened a law office, which he maintained until his death.

Lewis was elected as a Democratic member of the New Jersey General Assembly from Hudson County in 1878. He was also a delegate to the 1880 Democratic National Convention and a member of the New Jersey Democratic State Committee in 1884, when he was active in the presidential campaign of Grover Cleveland. After the election of Cleveland, Lewis was appointed Minister Resident/Consul General to Portugal on April 2, 1885. He served until June 14, 1889, when he returned to Hoboken to resume his legal practice.

== Personal life ==
Lewis was first married on March 23, 1858, to Lucy Balmain Ware (1839–1866) of Berryville, Virginia, and they had five children, though only one survived past infancy.

- Lucy Ware Lewis (1866–1944), who married Charles Treadwell McCormick (1861–1932)

On June 1, 1869, in Baltimore, Maryland, he married his second wife, Mary Picton (née Stevens) Garnett (1840–1903), the widow of Virginia politician Muscoe Russell Hunter Garnett and daughter of Edwin Augustus Stevens. Mary was also his second cousin, since her paternal grandmother, Rachel Cox, was the sister of his maternal grandmother, Sarah Cox. Also, her brother Edwin Augustus Stevens, Jr. later married Lewis's niece, Emily Contee Lewis, in 1879. Together, Edward and Mary had four children, including:

- Edwin Augustus Stevens Lewis (born 1870), who carried on his father's legal practice in Hoboken
- Esther Maria Lewis (born 1871), who married Charles Merrill Chapin and was a prominent socialite.

In 1892, Lewis died of heart disease at his Hoboken residence at the age of 55. He was buried at Princeton Cemetery in Princeton, New Jersey.

Diplomatic posts
| Preceded by Lewis Richmond | United States Ambassador to Portugal; 1885-1889 | Succeeded by George B. Loring |
