= John Hawxhurst =

American politician (1817–1881)

Member of the Virginia House of Delegates from the Fairfax County, Virginia district
- In office July 1, 1861 – December 5, 1871
- Preceded by: Orlando W. Huntt
- Succeeded by: D.W. Lewis

Personal details
- Born: January 24, 1817 Roslyn, New York, U.S.
- Died: April 17, 1881 (aged 64) Fairfax, Virginia, U.S.
- Spouse: Jane Kissam
- Occupation: Farmer, miller, politician

John Hawxhurst (January 24, 1817 – April 17, 1881) was a nineteenth-century American Quaker from New York who moved to Fairfax County, Virginia, where he and his younger brother Job Hawxhurst farmed and operated a grist mill beginning in 1846. As Union men, they fled Virginia temporarily as the American Civil War began in April 1861. John Hawxhurst helped Union forces as a guide, lived in Alexandria, Virginia and was active in the Restored Government of Virginia.

== Early and family life ==
John Hawxhurst was born near Long Island's Hempstead Harbor in Roslyn, Queens County, New York on January 24, 1817 to Townsend Hawxhurst (1779–1829) and his wife Rebecca. Townsend Hawxhurst was a Quaker minister who traveled extensively, including to Virginia. John was their first child, and he had numerous younger brothers and sisters. When his father died, John was 12, and the extended family helped by fostering some of his younger brothers and sisters.

John married Jane Kissam and initially lived in Manhasset, but several of their children died young. Daniel Kissam Hawxhurst was the only one of their natural children to have children; his brother Timothy S.K. Hawxhurst married but had no children. After the death of his brother Job's wife Maria, John and Jane fostered several of the children and eventually adopted Jane K. Hawxhurst.

== Career ==
In February 1846, Hawxhurst, his brother Job and their families moved to Fairfax County, Virginia, where they jointly farmed 470 acres in the Vale section (about 6 miles north of the Courthouse). They restored a gristmill to mill wheat into flour using the waterpower of Difficult Run. They worshiped at the Woodlawn Quaker Meetinghouse on the other side of the county, or during the American Civil War (when that meetinghouse was used by Union troops), the home of fellow Quakers Jonathan Roberts and his wife Abigail at Accotink.

=== American Civil War ===
The brothers opposed Virginia's secession after the election of President Abraham Lincoln, but were among the few Fairfax County voters to do so. Strong Union men during that conflict, they were forced to flee across the Potomac River to Washington (and sent their children to New York relatives) months after Virginia seceded in April 1861. Like Restored Governor Francis Harrison Pierpont (whose grandfather had grown up in the Fairfax Friends Meeting before leaving to enlist in the American Revolutionary War), Hawxhurst was considered a relatively Moderate Republican, despite his long-held abolitionist views.

John Hawxhurst helped Union forces as a guide and by identifying loyalists for General Winfield Hancock in Washington D.C. Asked to help the Restored Government of Virginia, Hawxhurst spent considerable time in Wheeling in what became West Virginia by the end of 1861, which prompted retaliation against his Fairfax County property. Hawxhurst was one of Fairfax County's two delegates at the Wheeling Convention of 1861 (alongside his neighbor, Maine-born Ebenezer E. Mason (1829–1910)). Hawxhurst was Fairfax County's sole delegate at the sessions of the General Assembly at Wheeling from July 1 to 26, 1861 and December 2, 1861 to February 13, 1862 (no-one represented Fairfax County at the Wheeling session of December 4, 1862 – February 5, 1863).

By mid-spring 1862, John Hawxhurst, his brother Job and fellow Fairfax County Quaker Jonathan Roberts all returned to eastern Virginia when Union forces occupied Alexandria and Fairfax City. Governor Pierpont moved the Restored Government of Virginia to Alexandria in 1863. John Hawxhurst then represented Fairfax County at the sessions of Virginia General Assembly at Alexandria on December 7, 1863 – February 8, 1864, and at the Convention of 1864 (which met under Governor Pierpont from February 13 to April 11, 1864). At that convention, John Hawxhurst proposed immediate and uncompensated emancipation for slaves (with the approval of all but one of his fellow Loyalist delegates) as well as a system of free public schools as was common in New England and New York. However, fellow delegates at that convention refused to endorse (as too radical) his proposals to permit black men to vote, for free education for black as well as white children, and to submit that constitution to voters for approval. Hawxhurst also represented Fairfax County at the General Assembly at Alexandria December 5, 1864 – March 7, 1865, and from June 19–23, 1865 in Richmond after the Confederate surrender.

=== Reconstruction ===
In January 1866, Hawxhurst and Roberts (who had been elected Sheriff of Fairfax County) testified before a Reconstruction Committee led by U.S. Representative Thaddeus Stevens. Their testimony (along with many other witnesses, including Robert E. Lee) led Congress to consider the Southern States unfit to rejoin the Union.

President Andrew Johnson (from Tennessee) disagreed with that assessment, and soon vetoed a bill to extend the life of the Freedmen's Bureau and later a Civil Rights Act. Virginia's General Assembly (in which Hawxhurst did not serve) then failed to soften a new Vagrant Act as Gov. Pierpont had urged, and also failed to ratify the 14th Amendment. Congress responded by passing a drastic Reconstruction Act, which President Johnson also vetoed. However, that veto was overridden, and Congressional Reconstruction began. General John Schofield was named the administrator of Military District Number One, i.e. Virginia.

Meanwhile, Virginians did not accept the 1864 Constitution that Hawxhurst had helped draft, in part because it had never been submitted for voter approval as he suggested. The prewar 1850 Constitution had expressly permitted slavery, which was abolished as the war ended. Reconstruction required a new Constitution before Virginia could be readmitted to the Union. In July 1866, John Hawxhurst was among the Union Republicans calling for a constitutional convention. On August 1, 1867, Virginia Republicans held a convention at a Baptist church in Richmond which was controlled by Radicals, who excluded Hawxhurst and other near moderates; Hawxhurst addressed the crowd outside.

The following month, Fairfax County voters (black and white) chose Hawxhurst to represent them at the Virginia Constitutional Convention of 1868. He was considered a candidate for President of the convention, but Radicals selected Judge John Curtiss Underwood instead. Hawxhurst was the only Quaker delegate, John Crenshaw having been defeated by African-American Burwell Toler to represent Hanover County, Virginia. During the convention, Hawxhurst promoted a fairly radical agenda including universal suffrage and education, and income rather than poll taxes. He also accused Underwood of misusing campaign funds to support Republican candidates, including Salmon P. Chase.

Around 1867, Hawxhurst moved his family from Alexandria to Falls Church, Virginia. He was also appointed a federal tax commissioner.

After Governor Pierpont was deposed by the federal administration early in Reconstruction, Hawxhurst lobbied to become his successor, but General Henry H. Wells was chosen instead. General John Schofield, who had been Virginia's military administrator (and who after the Constitutional Convention ended became Secretary of War under new President Ulysses S. Grant), did not think highly of John Hawkshurst.

In 1869, after Fairfax County (and other Virginia) voters overwhelmingly approved the new state Constitution that John Hawxhurst had helped draft (but not two controversial anti-Confederate clauses), they elected his brother Job as a Conservative or True Republican to represent them as their (part-time) delegate in the Virginia General Assembly. Other Quakers elected to that General Assembly session were Senator Thomas E. Taylor (1832–1892) of Goose Creek Meetinghouse (representing Loudoun, Prince William and part of Fairfax County) and Delegate John B. Crenshaw (b. 1820) of Richmond and Henrico County. John Hawxhurst never again sought state office.

== Death ==
John Hawxhurst died in Fairfax City on April 17, 1881. His burial place is not recorded. As a member of the Alexandria Friends Meeting, he may be buried in an unmarked grave at Woodlawn Quaker Meetinghouse or at the former burial ground, on which what is now the Kate Waller Barrett branch library was built in 1937.
