= Woodlawn (Fairfax County, Virginia) =

Historic house in Virginia, United States

- Woodlawn Plantation
- U.S. National Register of Historic Places
- U.S. National Historic Landmark
- Virginia Landmarks Register
- Woodlawn's east front

- Location within Northern Virginia Location within Virginia Location within the United States
- Location: West of junction of U.S. 1 and Rte. 235, Alexandria, Virginia
- Coordinates: 38°43′0″N 77°8′10″W
- Built: 1800–1805
- Architect: Dr. William Thornton
- Architectural style: Federal
- NRHP reference No.: 70000792 (original); 11000836 (increase)
- VLR No.: 029-0056

Significant dates
- Added to NRHP: February 26, 1970
- Boundary increase: November 18, 2011
- Designated NHL: August 6, 1998
- Designated VLR: December 2, 1969, September 22, 2011

Woodlawn is a historic house located in Fairfax County, Virginia. Originally a part of Mount Vernon, George Washington's historic plantation estate, it was subdivided in the 19th century by abolitionists to demonstrate the viability of a free labor system. The address is now 9000 Richmond Highway, Alexandria, Virginia, but due to expansion of Fort Belvoir and reconstruction of historic Route 1, access is via Woodlawn Road slightly south of Jeff Todd Way/State Route 235. The house is a designated National Historic Landmark, primarily for its association with the Washington family, but also for the role it played in the historic preservation movement. It is now a museum property owned and managed by the National Trust for Historic Preservation.

== History ==
George Washington planned the house to overlook Dogue Creek as well as be visible from (and viewing) Mount Vernon. In 1799, he gave the plantation (2,000 acres (810 ha) of land as well as gristmill and distillery) as a wedding present to Eleanor ("Nelly" or "Nellie") Parke Custis (Martha Washington's granddaughter who was raised on the Mount Vernon estate), and his nephew Major Lawrence Lewis. The President asked architect Dr. William Thornton, who had designed the U.S. Capitol, to design them a house.

Construction began in 1800 and was finished in 1805.

In late 1846, Eleanor Custis Lewis sold the property to a group of Burlington County, New Jersey Quakers from outside Philadelphia led by Chalkley Gillingham (1807–1881) and Jacob Troth. They harvested wood and began subdividing it into smaller farms to demonstrate that a free labor system could work at least as well as slave labor. Jacob Troth deeded the mansion to his son Paul Hillman Troth on March 25, 1850. The Quakers founded a cemetery and built a meetinghouse nearby in 1851 (for the Fairfax Section of the Alexandria Friends Meeting).

In 1853, the Quakers sold Woodlawn house and some land to Baptist John Mason, who likewise refused to use slave labor. By 1859, he and his wife operated a Sunday School on the property. After the American Civil War, his sons Ebenezer E. Mason and Otis T. Mason would found a Baptist church and burial ground across from the Quaker meetinghouse. Eben Mason and Quaker John Hawxhurst were Fairfax County's two Unionist delegates to the Wheeling Convention of 1861 which established the state of West Virginia. Hawxhurst would become one of Fairfax County's delegates to the Virginia Constitutional Convention of 1868.

Woodlawn's mansion house has fallen into disrepair several times, but all of its owners, recognizing its historic significance, have worked to preserve its character. Portions of the property were sold for development or merged into Fort Belvoir over the years. Progressive former U.S. Senator Oscar Underwood, one of the last Southern politicians to fight the Ku Klux Klan before World War II, retired to Woodlawn, where he died in 1929. Only about 160 acres surrounded the mansion house by 1970, and about 126 acres exist today. Since 1965, as discussed below, the Woodlawn Estate property is now also the site of the Pope-Leighey House, a Frank Lloyd Wright designed house.

== Current status ==
Woodlawn is owned and operated as a museum by the National Trust for Historic Preservation, part of the National Trust Community Investment Corporation. It was the National Trust's first acquisition, achieved in the late 1960s as part of a nationwide campaign that included major donations from philanthropist Paul Mellon. It and the adjacent Pope-Leighey House are open to the public (admission charged) Friday through Monday from April until mid-December. The property name is Woodlawn & Pope-Leighey House. It also hosts special events, particularly weddings and an annual Needlework Show, and hosts museum tours.

In 1965, construction on Interstate 66 led to that home built in 1940 by architect Frank Lloyd Wright for Loren Pope to be moved to the grounds of the Woodlawn estate . Four years later, Virginia's historic preservation office nominated Woodlawn, then Woodlawn plantation, for listing on the National Register of Historic Places, and such was approved in 1970. Woodlawn plantation was designated a U.S. National Historic Landmark in 1998, and the boundaries were increased slightly in 2011 by a donation of land from nearby Fort Belvoir which had been part of the Woodlawn plantation. The Quaker meetinghouse once part of the plantation was added to the National Register in 2009. Arcadia Farm leases land at Woodlawn to demonstrate sustainable agriculture by the Arcadia Center for Sustainable Food and Agriculture since 2010.

In April 2024, Woodlawn unveiled two new exhibits, as part of an initiative focusing on "expanding the narrative" about the land's inhabitants. "Woodlawn: People & Perspective" describes Woodlawn's connections to African-American history. "Offerings for the Tauxenent: Acknowledging Indigenous People", curated by Gabrielle Tayac, is dedicated to the Doeg people, who inhabited the site before it became a plantation. Because the Doeg left behind relatively few surviving artifacts, this exhibit features art made by contemporary native groups to commemorate the Doeg.

A different plantation with the same name on the Rappahannock River near Port Conway on Virginia's Northern Neck is the centerpiece of the Woodlawn Historic and Archeological District, recognized in 1990.

== See also ==
- List of National Historic Landmarks in Virginia
- National Register of Historic Places listings in Fairfax County, Virginia
