= Action at Accotink =

Action of the American Civil War

- Part of the American Civil War
Date	July 15, 1864
Location	Fairfax County, Virginia
Result	Inconclusive

Belligerents
United States (Union)	(Confederate States of America) CSA (Confederacy)

Commanders and leaders
Henry H. Wells	John S. Mosby

Strength
Home Guard detachment	200

Casualties and losses
1 killed	1 killed

The action at Accotink was a skirmish fought between a Union Army home guard unit and 200 Confederate States Army partisan rangers under the command of Colonel John S. Mosby in Fairfax County, Virginia on July 15, 1864. One soldier from each force was killed.
