= Woodlawn Quaker Meetinghouse =

Historic meetinghouse in Virginia, United States

- U.S. National Register of Historic Places
- Virginia Landmarks Register
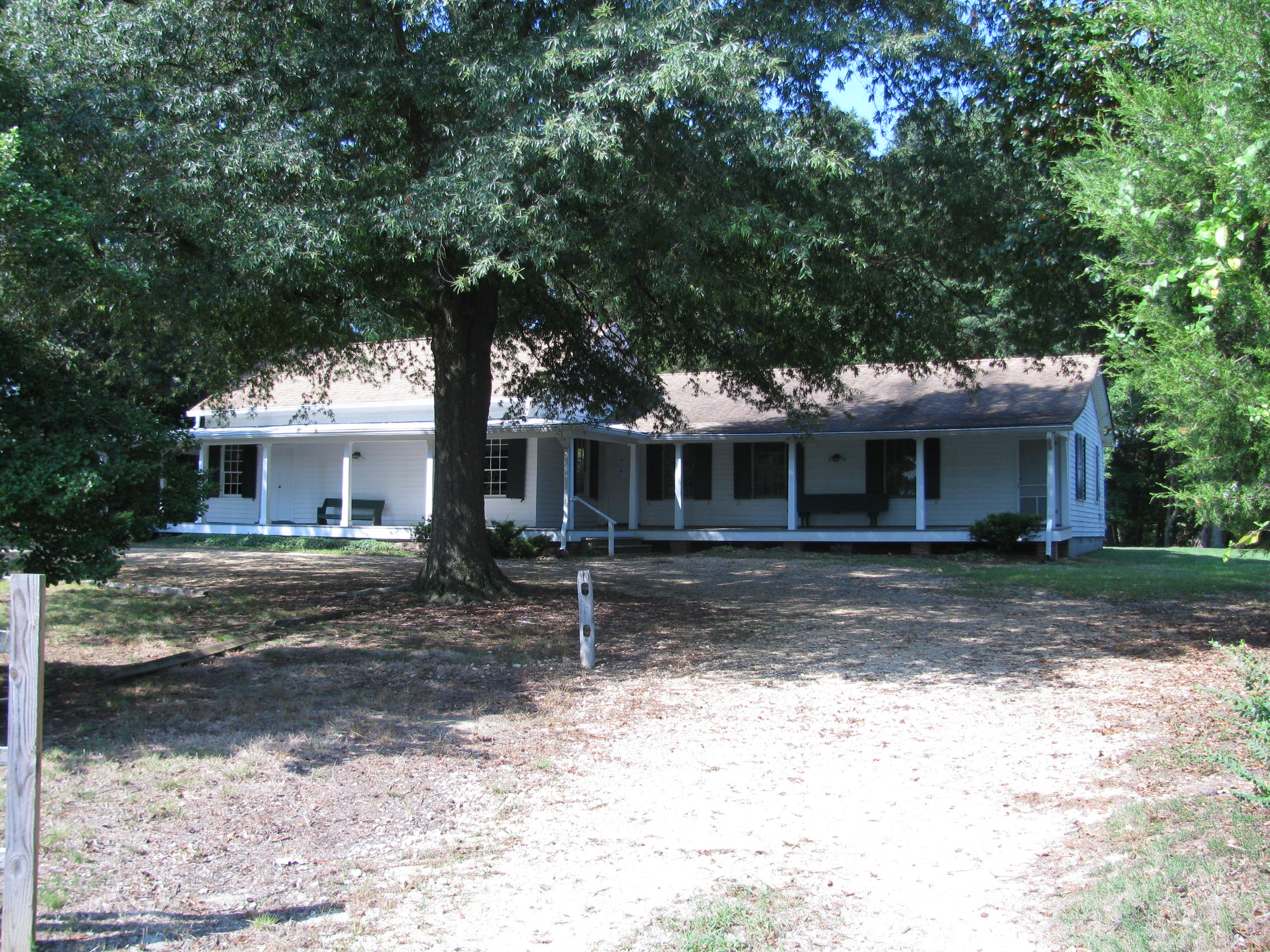

- Location within Northern Virginia Location within Virginia Location within the United States
- Location: 8990 Woodlawn Rd., Alexandria, Virginia
- Coordinates: 38°42′51″N 77°08′33″W
- Area: 2.4 acres (9,700 m^{2})
- Built: 1853, 1866-69
- Architectural style: Quaker Plain Style
- NRHP reference No.: 09000335
- VLR No.: 029-0172

Significant dates
- Added to NRHP: May 21, 2009
- Designated VLR: March 19, 2009

The Woodlawn Quaker Meetinghouse is located at 8890 Woodlawn Road in Alexandria, Virginia, United States. The meetinghouse and its associated cemetery are significant for their role in the Quaker community in this area of Virginia in the mid to late 19th century. The meetinghouse itself is also significant for its Quaker Plain Style architecture. The property was added to the National Register of Historic Places on May 21, 2009, and the listing was announced as the featured listing in the National Park Service's weekly list of May 29, 2009.

The original meetinghouse, now the southern half, was built in 1853. The northern half was added between 1866 and 1869. Both halves are wood frame, one story, gable roofed structures. The style reflects the Quaker belief in simplicity and lack of adornment. The rectangular building faces east, with two entrances on the long side of the rectangle. One entrance was for women, and one for men. On the interior, there is a center wall with window-like opening. The openings can be shuttered to accommodate separate meetings for men and women. The seating is historic, simple, wooden benches. The porch that currently wraps around the building was added at a later time. Union soldiers occupied the building during the American Civil War, and carved their names and initials to the right of what was then the only entryway.
