= Eleanor Parke Custis Lewis =

Granddaughter of Martha Washington

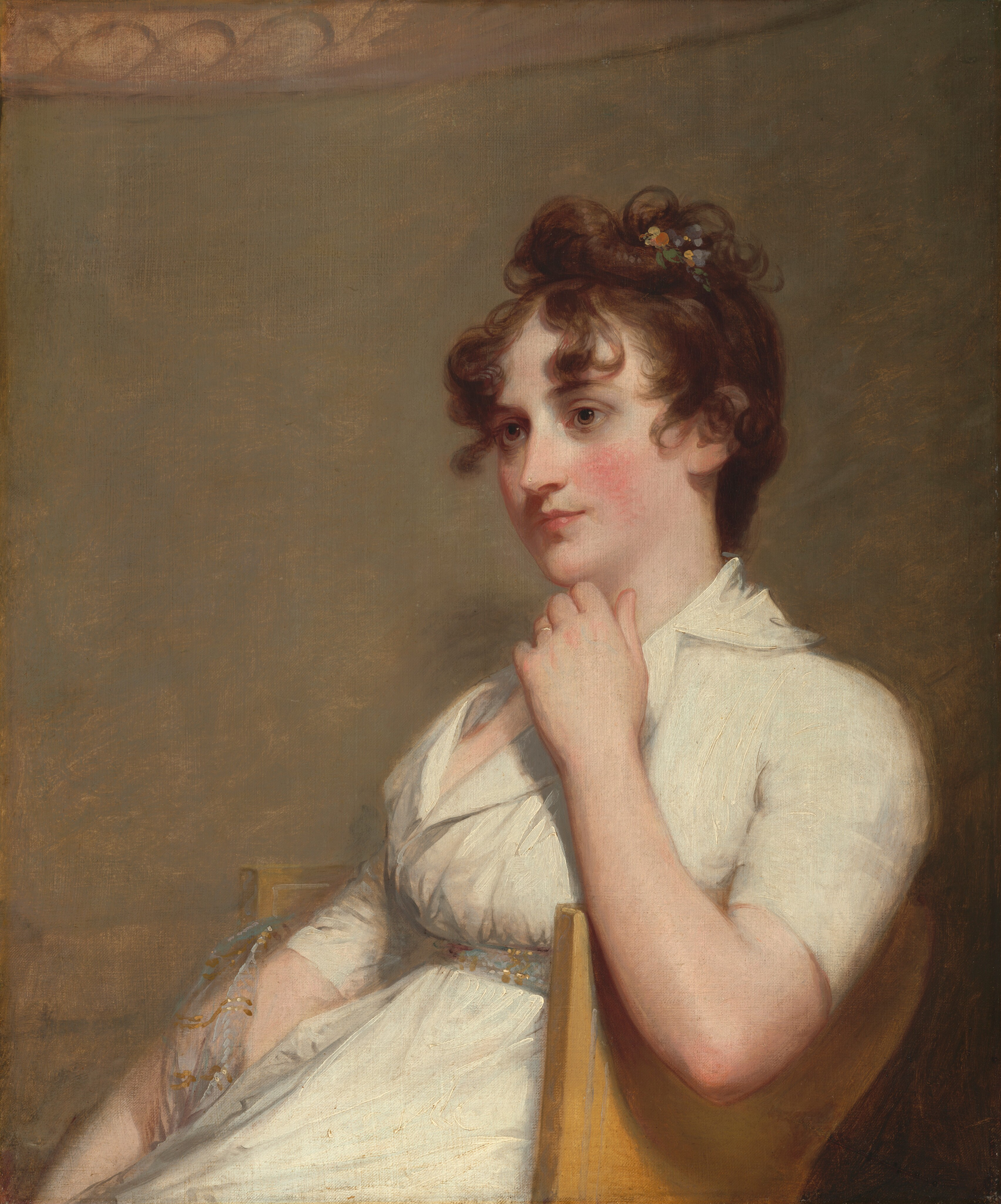
- Portrait by Gilbert Stuart, c. 1804
- Born: Eleanor Parke Custis; March 31, 1779; Mount Airy, Prince George's County, Maryland, U.S.
- Died: July 15, 1852 (aged 73); Clarke County, Virginia, U.S.
- Resting place: Mount Vernon, Fairfax County, Virginia, U.S.
- Spouse: Lawrence Lewis
- Children: 8
- Parent(s): John Parke Custis; Eleanor Calvert
- Relatives: Martha Washington (paternal grandmother); Daniel Parke Custis (paternal grandfather); George Washington (paternal adopted grandfather)

Eleanor Parke Custis Lewis (March 31, 1779 – July 15, 1852) was a granddaughter of Martha Washington and a step-granddaughter of George Washington.

== Early life ==
Arms of George Washington Parke Custis

Nelly was born on March 31, 1779, at Mount Airy, her maternal grandfather's estate in Prince George's County, Maryland, the daughter of John Parke Custis and Eleanor Calvert Custis. Her father was the only surviving son of Daniel Parke Custis and his widow, Martha Dandridge Custis, who married George Washington in 1759. She was also the granddaughter of Benedict Swingate Calvert, an illegitimate son of Charles Calvert, 5th Baron Baltimore, whose mother may have been a granddaughter of George I. He was descended from Charles II through the king's daughter by Barbara Villiers, Charlotte FitzRoy.

Following the premature death of their father John Parke Custis in 1781, Nelly and her brother, George Washington Parke Custis, were placed under the guardianship of the Washingtons and grew up at Mount Vernon, although they visited their mother, stepfather David Stuart and older sisters at Abington and later at Dr. Stuart's estates in Fairfax County.

During George Washington's presidency, Nelly helped entertain guests at the first presidential mansion on Cherry Street in New York City, the second presidential mansion on Broadway in New York City, and the third presidential mansion in Philadelphia.

== Personal life ==
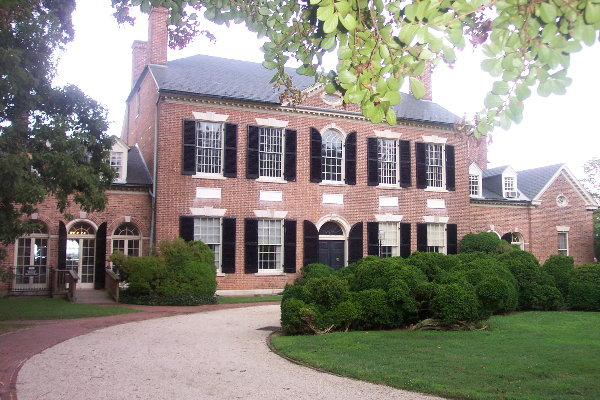
Woodlawn Plantation in Fairfax County, Virginia, in 2003

On February 22, 1799, Nelly Custis married George Washington's nephew, the widower Lawrence Lewis of Fredericksburg, Virginia. Before that marriage, some had hoped Nelly would marry Thomas Adams, son of John and Abigail Adams. But his parents wanted him to wed after his brother John Quincy Adams. The Washingtons gave the young couple their "best and most productive farm" of those constituting Mount Vernon, the 2,000-acre (8.1 km^{2}) Dogue Run farm. After visiting various Lewis relatives during the entire spring and summer and respite because of illnesses incurred by both Lawrence and Nelly, then Nelly's incipient pregnancy, the Lewises built Woodlawn Plantation.

The Lewises had eight children, four of whom lived to adulthood:

- Frances Parke Lewis (1799–1875), married Edward George Washington Butler, nephew of General Richard Butler.
- Martha Betty Lewis (1801–1802), died in infancy
- Lawrence Fielding Lewis (1802–1802), died in infancy
- Lorenzo Lewis (1803–1847), father of Edward Parke Custis Lewis, grandfather of Esther Maria Lewis Chapin.
- Eleanor Agnes Freire Lewis (1805–1820), died unmarried
- Fielding Augustine Lewis (1807–1809), died in childhood
- George Washington Custis Lewis (1810–1811), died in infancy
- Martha Eleanor Angela Lewis Conrad (1813–1839), married Charles M. Conrad
- Eleanor also suffered miscarriages in 1800, 1804, 1806, 1808, 1809, 1811, 1812 and 1814.

Upon her marriage, Nelly Lewis inherited about 80 slaves from her father's estate. Her grandfather Daniel Parke Custis's estate was liquidated following Martha Washington's death in 1802, and Nelly Lewis inherited about thirty-five "dower" slaves from Mount Vernon. Following the death of Eleanor Calvert in 1811, the John Parke Custis estate was liquidated, and Nelly Lewis inherited approximately forty additional slaves.

In about 1830, the Lewises moved to Audley plantation in Clarke County, Virginia. Beginning in the mid-1830s, they began dividing their time between Virginia and their daughters' homes in Louisiana. Nelly Custis Lewis continued to live at Audley after her husband's death in 1839.

Throughout her life, she regarded herself as a preserver of George Washington's legacy. She shared memories and mementos, entertained and corresponded with those seeking information on the first president, and verified or debunked stories.

A shaft to the east of the Washingtons' tomb at Mount Vernon marks her burial site.
