= Elmhurst =

Elmhurst may refer to:

== Places ==
=== Australia ===
- Elmhurst, Victoria

=== United Kingdom ===
- Elmhurst, Aylesbury
- Elmhurst, Staffordshire

=== United States ===
- Elmhurst, Sacramento, California
- Elmhurst, Oakland, California
- Elmhurst, Delaware
- Elmhurst, Illinois
- Elmhurst, Indiana
- Elmhurst (Connersville, Indiana), listed on the National Register of Historic Places in Fayette County, Indiana
- Elmhurst, Kansas
- Elmhurst, Michigan
- Elmhurst, Queens, New York
- Elmhurst, Chautauqua County, New York
- Elmhurst Township, Lackawanna County, Pennsylvania
- Elmhurst, Providence, Rhode Island
- Elmhurst (Norfolk, Virginia)
- Elmhurst (Fredericksburg, Virginia), listed on the National Register of Historic Places in Fredericksburg, Virginia
- Elmhurst, West Virginia
- Elmhurst (Caldwell, West Virginia)
- Elmhurst (Wellsburg, West Virginia)
- Elmhurst, Wisconsin

=== West Indies ===
- Elmhurst, a province of the West Indies Federation

== Schools ==
=== England ===
- Elmhurst Infant School, Aylesbury, Buckinghamshire
- Elmhurst Junior School, Aylesbury, Buckinghamshire
- Elmhurst School, Croydon, South London
- Elmhurst Ballet School, Birmingham

=== United States ===
- Elmhurst High School, Fort Wayne, Indiana
- Elmhurst University, Elmhurst, Illinois

== See also ==
- Elmhirst (disambiguation)
