= National Register of Historic Places listings in Fredericksburg, Virginia =

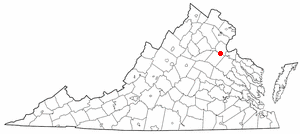
Location of Fredericksburg in Virginia

Fredericksburg, Virginia, United States, has 29 properties and districts listed on the National Register of Historic Places, including three National Historic Landmarks.

The locations of National Register properties and districts for which the latitude and longitude coordinates are included below may be seen in an online map.

This National Park Service list is complete through NPS recent listings posted June 26, 2026.

== Current listings ==
| | Name on the Register | Image | Date listed | Location | Description |
|---|---|---|---|---|---|
| 1 | Braehead | Braehead | May 11, 2000 (#00000484) | 123 Lee Dr. 38°16′53″N 77°28′23″W | Also known as Howison House; played a significant role in U.S. Civil War battle plans during the Fredericksburg campaigns of 1862–1864 |
| 2 | Brompton | Brompton | July 24, 1979 (#79003279) | Hanover St. and Sunken Rd. 38°17′46″N 77°28′11″W | Residence of the President of the University of Mary Washington; headquarters of Confederate General James Longstreet during the Battle of Fredericksburg (1862–1863) |
| 3 | Carl's | Carl's | June 30, 2005 (#05000642) | 2200 Princess Anne St. 38°18′50″N 77°28′09″W | Art Moderne-style ice cream stand built in 1947; also known as Carl's Custard Stand |
| 4 | The Chimneys | The Chimneys | April 3, 1975 (#75002109) | 623 Caroline St. 38°18′02″N 77°27′27″W | Built in 1771 for John Glassell |
| 5 | Elmhurst | Elmhurst | March 27, 2008 (#08000242) | 2010 Fall Hill Ave. 38°18′41″N 77°28′14″W | |
| 6 | Fall Hill | Fall Hill | June 18, 1973 (#73002062) | Northwest of Fredericksburg off Fall Hill Ave. 38°19′05″N 77°29′30″W | Georgian two-story home built in 1790 for Francis Thorton V |
| 7 | Fall Hill Avenue Medical Historic District | | May 8, 2025 (#100011797) | 2300-2501 Fall Hill Avenue; 38°18′47″N 77°28′21″W | |
| 8 | Farmers Bank of Fredericksburg | Farmers Bank of Fredericksburg | August 11, 1983 (#83003283) | 900 Princess Anne St. 38°18′08″N 77°27′37″W | |
| 9 | Federal Hill | Federal Hill | March 26, 1975 (#75002110) | Southern side of Hanover St. between Jackson and Prince Edward Sts. 38°18′01″N 77°27′43″W | |
| 10 | Fredericksburg and Confederate Cemetery | Fredericksburg and Confederate Cemetery | May 21, 2019 (#100003480) | 1000-1100 Washington Ave. 38°18′08″N 77°28′00″W | Distinct from Fredericksburg National Cemetery |
| 11 | Fredericksburg and Spotsylvania County Battlefields Memorial National Military Park | Fredericksburg and Spotsylvania County Battlefields Memorial National Military Park | October 15, 1966 (#66000046) | Fredericksburg and western and southwestern areas in Spotsylvania County; 38°17′34″N 77°28′09″W | |
| 12 | Fredericksburg Gun Manufactory Site | Fredericksburg Gun Manufactory Site | November 14, 1978 (#78003184) | Address Restricted | |
| 13 | Fredericksburg Historic District | Fredericksburg Historic District | September 22, 1971 (#71001053) | Roughly bounded by the Rappahannock River, Hazel Run, and Prince Edward and Canal Sts. 38°18′12″N 77°27′37″W | |
| 14 | Fredericksburg Town Hall and Market Square | Fredericksburg Town Hall and Market Square | July 22, 1994 (#94000683) | 907 Princess Anne St. 38°18′11″N 77°27′36″W | |
| 15 | Idlewild | Idlewild | June 8, 2009 (#09000415) | 1501 Gateway Boulevard; 38°17′21″N 77°30′15″W | |
| 16 | Kenmore | Kenmore | June 4, 1969 (#69000325) | 1201 Washington Ave. 38°18′15″N 77°27′58″W | Home of Fielding and Betty Washington Lewis. Betty was the sister of George Washington, the first president of the United States |
| 17 | The Lewis Store | The Lewis Store | January 2, 2013 (#12001135) | 1200 Caroline St. 38°18′20″N 77°27′40″W | |
| 18 | Matthew Fontaine Maury School | Matthew Fontaine Maury School | March 7, 2007 (#07000133) | 900 Barton St. 38°18′02″N 77°27′53″W | High school built in 1919-1920 |
| 19 | Monroe Law Office | Monroe Law Office | November 13, 1966 (#66000917) | 908 Charles St. 38°18′09″N 77°27′42″W | |
| 20 | Presbyterian Church of Fredericksburg | Presbyterian Church of Fredericksburg | March 1, 1984 (#84003534) | Southwest of Princess Anne and George Sts. 38°18′07″N 77°27′37″W | |
| 21 | Rising Sun Tavern | Rising Sun Tavern | October 15, 1966 (#66000919) | 1306 Caroline St. 38°18′25″N 77°27′43″W | |
| 22 | Rowe House | Rowe House | November 12, 2008 (#08001052) | 801 Hanover St. 38°17′54″N 77°27′58″W | |
| 23 | St. George's Episcopal Church | St. George's Episcopal Church | March 19, 2019 (#100003541) | 905 Princess Anne St. 38°18′09″N 77°27′36″W | |
| 24 | Sentry Box | Sentry Box | February 26, 1992 (#90002135) | 133 Caroline St. 38°17′44″N 77°27′14″W | |
| 25 | Shiloh Baptist Church (Old Site) | Shiloh Baptist Church (Old Site) | December 15, 2015 (#15000907) | 801 Sophia St. 38°18′08″N 77°27′26″W | |
| 26 | Sligo | Sligo | November 18, 2019 (#100004658) | 1100 Dixon St. 38°17′16″N 77°27′20″W | |
| 27 | Walker-Grant School | Walker-Grant School | October 30, 1998 (#98001311) | Gunnery Rd. between Dunmore and Ferdinand Sts. 38°17′38″N 77°27′28″W | First Black public high school in Fredericksburg, Virginia. Named for Joseph Walker and Jason Grant. |
| 28 | Washington Avenue Historic District | Washington Avenue Historic District | May 16, 2002 (#02000518) | 1200-1500 blocks of Washington Ave., and 620 Lewis St. 38°18′18″N 77°28′06″W | |
| 29 | Mary Washington House | Mary Washington House | June 5, 1975 (#75002111) | 1200 Charles St. 38°18′18″N 77°27′47″W | |

== See also ==
- List of National Historic Landmarks in Virginia
- National Register of Historic Places listings in Virginia
- National Register of Historic Places listings in Caroline County, Virginia
- National Register of Historic Places listings in Spotsylvania County, Virginia
- National Register of Historic Places listings in Stafford County, Virginia
- National Register of Historic Places listings in Westmoreland County, Virginia
