= Elmhurst School =

Elmhurst School may refer to several schools:

== England ==
- Elmhurst Infant School, Aylesbury, Buckinghamshire
- Elmhurst Junior School, Aylesbury, Buckinghamshire
- Elmhurst School, Croydon, South London
- Elmhurst Ballet School, Birmingham

== United States ==
- Elmhurst High School, Fort Wayne, Indiana

== See also ==
- Elmhurst University, Illinois, United States
- The Elmhirst School, Barnsley, England, now the Barnsley Academy
