= Rowe House =

Rowe House may refer to:

in the United States (by state then city)

- Rowe and Weed Houses, Granby, Connecticut, listed on the National Register of Historic Places (NRHP) in Hartford County
- Belcher-Rowe House, Milton, Massachusetts, listed on the NRHP in Norfolk County
- Rowe House (Milford, Michigan), listed on the NRHP in Oakland County
- John Rowe House, Jasper, Minnesota, listed on the NRHP in Pipestone County
- Miller-Rowe-Holgate House, Reno, Nevada, listed on the NRHP in Washoe County
- Benjamin Rowe House, Gilford, New Hampshire, listed on the NRHP in Belknap County
- Rowe Pueblo, Rowe, New Mexico, listed on the NRHP in San Miguel County
- Rowe House (Wayland, New York), listed on the NRHP in Steuben County
- Rowe House (Pierre, South Dakota), listed on the NRHP in Hughes County
- Nicholas Rowe House, Park City, Utah, listed on the NRHP in Summit County
- Rowe House (Fredericksburg, Virginia), listed on the NRHP in Fredericksburg
