= Bitter Sweet Blues =

Studio album by Gaye Adegbalola
- Released: 1999
- Genre: Blues
- Label: Alligator
- Producer: Rory Block

Gaye Adegbalola chronology
Bitter Sweet Blues (1999)	Neo-Classic Blues (2004)

Bitter Sweet Blues is an album by the American musician Gaye Adegbalola, released in 1999. Recorded for Alligator Records, it was her first solo album.

== Production ==
The album was produced by Rory Block, who also played slide guitar. Adegbalola wrote or cowrote eight of its songs. "Prove It on Me Blues" is a version of the Ma Rainey song. "Images" is a cover of the Nina Simone song. "She Just Wants to Dance" was written by Keb' Mo'. "Need a Little Sugar in My Bowl" is a rendition of the song made famous by Bessie Smith. "Nightmare" deals with child molestation. "Nothing's Changed", cowritten by Block, examines the legacy of the civil rights movement. "Front Door Blues" is about an attempt to come out of the closet. Ysaye Barnwell sings on "Let Go, Let God".

== Critical reception ==
Professional ratings
Review scores
Source	Rating
AllMusic	3/5 stars
DownBeat	3.5/5 stars
Edmonton Journal	3.5/5 stars
The Gazette	4/5 stars
The Penguin Guide to Blues Recordings	2.5/4 stars
The Philadelphia Inquirer	3.5/4 stars
Pittsburgh Post-Gazette	3.5/4 stars

The Pittsburgh Post-Gazette deemed the album "emotional and heartfelt," writing that "Adegbalola combines her personal and musical life story into an adventurous and enjoyable package." The Edmonton Journal wrote that "Adegbalola's voice—whether cheeky, conversational or even jazzy in parts—cuts to the real thing." The Gazette determined that Bitter Sweet Blues "makes very effective use of timeless blues forms to deliver messages of feminist and African-American empowerment."

The Asbury Park Press noted that "her lyrics are delightfully saucy and sassy, without being raunchy." The Washington Post opined that "even if one agrees with her progressive politics, one might still wince at her heavy-handed approach."

AllMusic concluded that "each song has either humor or power, sometimes both... The only thing that seems incongruous is the mixture of songs with wildly varying moods and topics."

== Track listing ==
No.	Title	Length
1.	"She Just Wants to Dance"
2.	"Need a Little Sugar in My Bowl"
3.	"You Don't Have to Take It (Like I Did)"
4.	"Big Ovaries, Baby"
5.	"Nothing's Changed"
6.	"You Really Got a Hold on Me"
7.	"The Dog Was Here First"
8.	"Front Door Blues"
9.	"Only One Truth"
10.	"Prove It on Me Blues"
11.	"Jail House Blues"
12.	"Images"
13.	"Nightmare"
14.	"Let Go, Let God"
