= Elmhirst =

Elmhirst is a surname. Notable people with the surname include:

- Edward Elmhirst (1811-1893), cricketer
- Leonard Knight Elmhirst (1893-1974), English agronomist and philanthropist
- Dorothy Payne Whitney (1887-1968), American-born social activist and philanthropist (sometimes known as Dorothy Elmhirst)
- Sophie Elmhirst, British journalist and author
- Thomas Elmhirst (1895-1982), a senior commander in the Royal Air Force
- Tom Elmhirst (born 1971), British music producer and mix engineer

== See also ==
- The Elmhirst School, a former school in Barnsley, England
- Elmhurst (disambiguation)
