= Gaye Adegbalola =

American singer (born 1944)

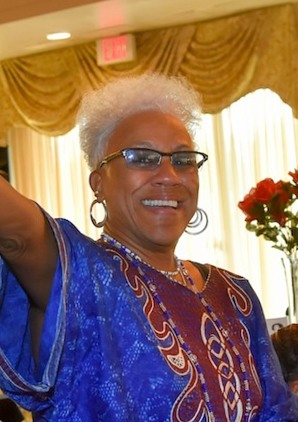
- Adegbalola in 2016

Background information
- Born: Gaye Todd; March 21, 1944 (age 82); Fredericksburg, Virginia, U.S.
- Genres: Blues
- Occupations: Singer; guitarist
- Instruments: Vocals; guitar
- Years active: 1984–present
- Label: Alligator
- Website: adegbalola.com

Gaye Adegbalola (born Gaye Todd; March 21, 1944,) is an American blues singer and guitarist, teacher, lecturer, activist, and photographer.

== Early life and education ==
Gaye Adegbalola was born on March 21, 1944, in Fredericksburg, Virginia. Adegbalola's father, Clarence R. Todd, was the first Black school board member in Fredericksburg, as well as a jazz musician. He founded a performing arts group for black youth called "Souls of Shade", today known as "Harambee 360° Experimental Theater." Her mother, Gladys P. Todd, was an early organizer of local civil rights movement in Fredericksburg and she frequently brought home old jazz records from her job at the Youth Canteen to give to young Gaye.

Abegbalola attended a segregated high school called Walker–Grant High School, and she graduated as her class valedictorian in 1961. During her time at Walker-Grant High School, she participated in numerous sit-in protests and picket lines as a member of the civil rights movement. She later attended Boston University, where she graduated with a B.A. in biology.

== Career ==
Adegbalola's occupations after college included being a technical writer for TRW Systems, a biochemical researcher at Rockefeller University, and a bacteriologist at Harlem Hospital where she was also the local union representative. These were all in sharp contrast to her first job as a teenager, where she worked at a laundry mat for forty-five cents an hour. From 1966 to 1970, she was involved in the Black Power Movement in New York and she organized the Harlem Committee on Self-Defense, where she met individuals such as Audre Lorde.

In 1970, Adgbalola returned to Fredericksburg, where she taught science, gifted and talented and creative thinking courses in local schools. She helped her father direct the Harambee Theater, sometimes acting in performances herself, until his death in 1977. That same year, Gaye began studying guitar after already mastering the flute while she was in her high school's band. In 1978, she received her Master of Education in Educational Media from Virginia State University, and in 1982 was honored as Virginia's Teacher of the Year. She spent much of the rest of the 1980s conducting teachers' workshops on motivational and teaching techniques.

Saffire – The Uppity Blues Women was first formed as a duo in 1984 by Adegbalola and her guitar teacher, Ann Rabson, with Earlene Lewis joining later to form a trio. Lewis was replaced by Andra Faye in 1992. Saffire recorded their first album, Middle Age Blues, on their own label in 1987, with songs including "They Call Me Miss Thang" and "Middle Age Blues Boogie". The following year, Adegbalola became a full-time blues performer and in 1990 the band recorded its first album for Alligator Records, and they won the "Song of the Year" W.C. Handy Award for their song "Middle Age Blues Boogie".

During the 1990s, Adegbalola held workshops on various aspects of blues music and worked as a blues music reporter for the World Cafe program on National Public Radio. In 1998, she co-founded the Steering Committee of the Blues Music Association. Her first solo album, Bitter Sweet Blues, was recorded in 1999. In addition to her own original compositions ("You Don't Have to Take It (Like I Did)," "Big Ovaries, Baby" and "Nothing's Changed"), the album had cover versions of songs by Bessie Smith, Smokey Robinson, Ma Rainey and Nina Simone.

Adegbalola was nominated for two Outmusic awards in 2005. Adegbalola's song "Big Ovaries, Baby" was used in episode 23 of The War On Democracy! podcast. Saffire – The Uppity Blues Women disbanded amicably in 2009, but Adegbalola continues to pursue solo projects.

Adegbalola was honored as one of the Library of Virginia's Virginia Women in History for 2018.

In 2026, she was a recipient of the Torchbearer "Carrying Change" Awards' Legend Award.

== Personal life ==
In 1992, Adegbalola was diagnosed with uterine and cervical cancer, and fortunately she eventually recovered. In 2000, in a short piece on her work and career in The Advocate, Adegbalola came out as a lesbian. She had been with her life partner, Suzanne Moe, since 1991.

In the late 1960s, when she was living in Harlem, Adegbalola married Olumide, who was at the time the manager of the original Last Poets. Her son, Juno Lumumba Kahlil, was born in 1969 and later made his own mark in the goth/industrial music world. Soon after, Adegbalola and Olumide divorced.

Her surname, Adegbalola, was given to her by a Yoruba priest she met in 1968. The surname translates to "I am reclaiming my royalty," and Gaye uses the name to signify her pride in her black heritage.

== Discography ==
- Bitter Sweet Blues (1999)
- Neoclassic Blues (2004)
  - With Roddy Barnes
- Blues Gone Back (2006)
  - With Juno Lumumba Kahlil aka DJ Blacula – The Junabomber
- Gaye Without Shame (2008)
- Blues In All Flavors (2012)
  - Parents' Choice Gold Award in Music
- The Griot (2019)
- Is It Still Good To Ya? (2019)
- Satisfied (2023)
