= Shiloh Baptist Church (Old Site) =

Historic church in Virginia, US

- U.S. National Register of Historic Places
- Virginia Landmarks Register
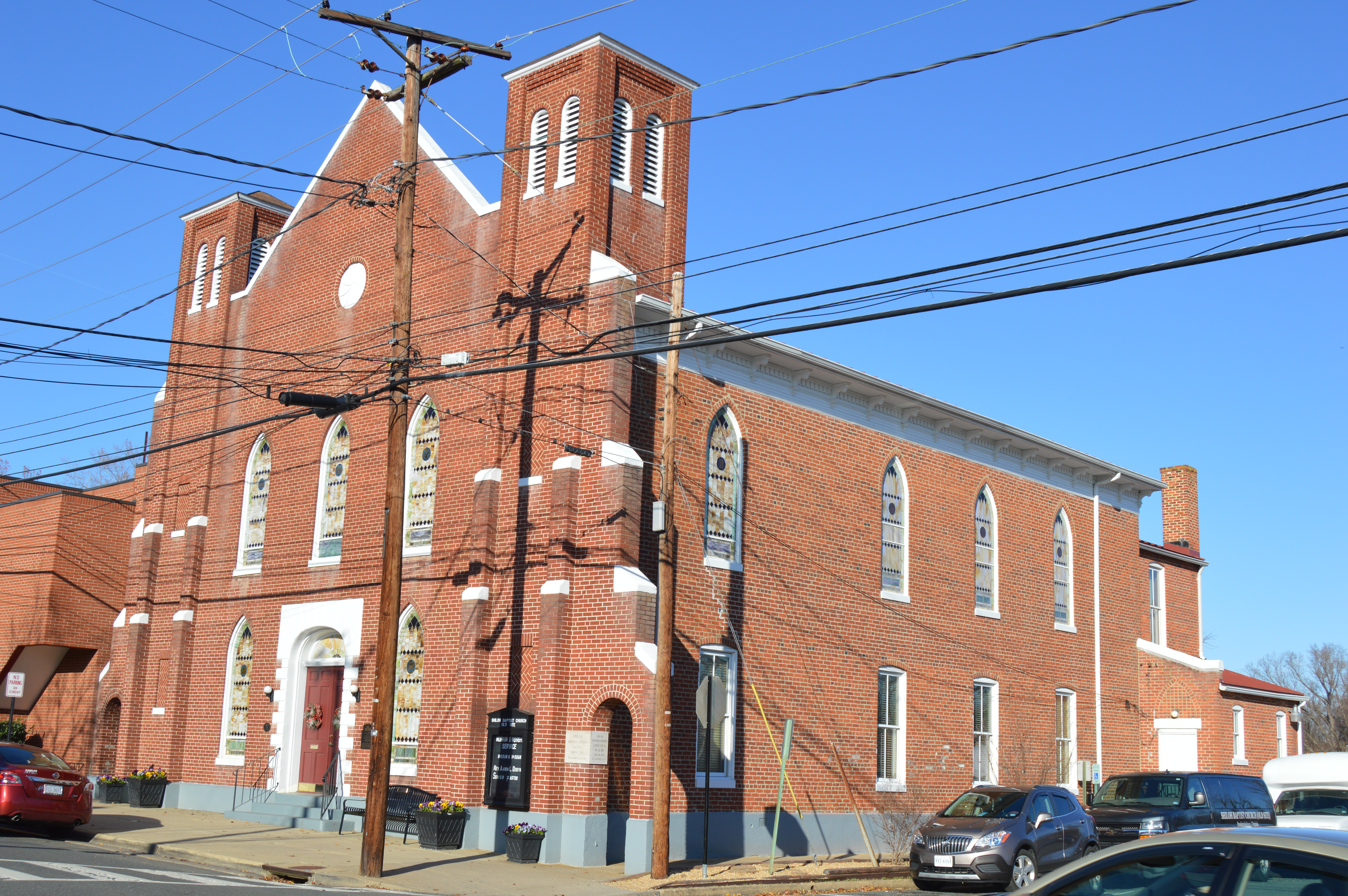
- Front and southern side

- Location within Northern Virginia Location within Virginia Location within the United States
- Location: 801 Sophia St., Fredericksburg, Virginia
- Coordinates: 38°18′8″N 77°27′26″W
- Area: less than one acre
- Built: 1890
- Architectural style: Classical Revival; Late Gothic Revival; Italian Renaissance Revival
- NRHP reference No.: 15000907
- VLR No.: 111-0096

Significant dates
- Added to NRHP: December 15, 2015
- Designated VLR: September 17, 2015

The Shiloh Baptist Church (Old Site) is a historic Baptist church at 801 Sophia Street in downtown Fredericksburg, Virginia. The church is a two-story brick building with predominantly Classical Revival styling, modeled to some degree after the Presbyterian Church of Fredericksburg, with later alterations. The church was built in 1890 for a predominantly African-American congregation, whose origins lie in a mixed-race Baptist congregation founded in 1804. That congregation split about 1815, worshipping in a building at this site, and became known as the Shiloh Baptist Church with the construction of a new building here in the 1830s. In 1849 the large congregation again divided, with most of its white members leaving to form the Fredericksburg Baptist Church at Princess Anne and Amelia Streets. Services were discontinued during the American Civil War, and the existing building was damaged, in part due to abuse caused during military occupation of the city. It collapsed in 1886, and the present building was constructed in 1890 as its replacement. However, due to a schism in the congregation, two separate groups claimed the name "Shiloh Baptist", which was resolved by giving the one at this location the name "Shiloh Baptist Church (Old Site)", which it still retains.

The church was listed on the National Register of Historic Places in 2015.
