= Fredericksburg Dog Mart =

Annual dog show in Virginia

- Genre: Dog show, family festival
- Date: September or October
- Frequency: Annually
- Location: Spotsylvania County
- Years active: 1698–1776; 1927–1941; 1948–present
- Inaugurated: 1698
- Most recent: September 30, 2017
- Next event: September 25, 2021
- Attendance: up to 14,000 (1950s)
- Organiser: Izaak Walton League – Fredericksburg-Rappahannock Chapter
- Website: fredericksburgdogmart.com

The Fredericksburg Dog Mart is an annual dog show event currently held in Spotsylvania County, Virginia. The event first took place in 1698 to facilitate trading between the Manahoac Tribe of King William County, Virginia and settlers in and around the area that would become the city of Fredericksburg. At the Dog Mart, the Manahoac (and later, the Pamunkey and the Mattaponi) would trade furs and produce for prized English hunting dogs. Though it has not been held continuously, it is the oldest event of its kind in the United States.

== History ==
In the early 17th century, American colonists raising tobacco in Virginia were concerned that the Native Americans were overhunting game. Gentleman farmers were having trouble finding game to hunt near their plantations for sport. Until that time, settlers in Virginia had traded and given dogs brought from England to the Native Americans who used them in hunting. In 1619, the Virginia Assembly passed a law forbidding the sale of, "any English dogs of quality as a mastiff, greyhound, bloodhounde, land or water spaniel, or any other dog". The penalty for breaking this law was a fine of 5 shillings.

The ban on selling or giving away dogs ended in the late 17th century. The House of Burgesses passed an act in 1677 that provided for the trade of dogs and other items with Native Americans. The act established a "marte" or "faire" where, during a truce of several days each year, the settlers and Native Americans traded dogs, livestock, and other goods in the settled areas of Virginia.

The first "Fredericksburg" mart (Fredericksburg was not established as a town until 1728) was likely held within the protection of a fort known as Smith's Fort established below the falls on the Rappahannock in what is now Spotsylvania County. A trading agreement was concluded between the Manahoac tribe and the settlers. As a result of this agreement, and to promote peace, an annual fair was held in Fredericksburg where settlers could trade English hunting dogs for the Native Americans' produce and furs. This annual fair continued until the start of the Revolutionary War when it was stopped because of the settlers mistrust of the Native Americans during the fight for independence.

== Present day ==
The Dog Mart was not held again until 1927 when the traditional event was known as Dog Curb Market. At that time the event was held at City Park in Fredericksburg. The mart was scheduled for October each year to coincide with the beginning of hunting season in the area. This provided hunters with the opportunity to purchase hunting dogs. At that time the event began to gain nationwide attention. It was the subject of a Pathe newsreel feature in 1928 and Time magazine featured the Dog Mart in an article in October 1937. In 1938, 7,000 people and 641 dogs attended the event.

After a suspension of the Dog Mart during World War II, the event was once again revived in 1948 by the Fredericksburg Chamber of Commerce under the auspices of the local chapter of the Izaak Walton League, a conservation oriented organization. The Dog Mart was held at the Maury School stadium in Fredericksburg. A delegation of 100 Pamunkey Indians from their reservation in nearby King William County and led by Chief T.D. Cook, attended the 1949 Dog Mart. At the event in October 1949, the event drew an estimated 15,000 spectators and participants from 30 states, Canada, Mexico, and England. In 1951, National Geographic magazine published a 16-page article about the Dog Mart in the June issue.

The event was moved outside the town to a park owned by the Izaak Walton League in the 1970s. In 1980, the Dog Mart was held for the only time without any dogs. The sponsors of the event made the decision to follow the state veterinarian's advice to exclude the dogs due to a canine epidemic. Modern day Dog Marts have featured crafts, Indian events, rides, fiddling and fox-horn blowing contests, as well as a dog parade, show, auctions, and a reenactment of the first Dog Mart. The 2015 Dog Mart featured a police canine demonstration, archery demonstration, trapping exhibition and demonstration by local trappers, children's fishing tournament, large firearm exhibition, barrel train ride, plus a dog show with judging. The Dog Mart celebrated its 317th anniversary in 2015 and continues to be held each year at the Fredericksburg-Rappahannock Chapter of the Izaak Walton League in Spotsylvania, Virginia. It is the oldest such event in United States. The Fredericksburg Dog Mart should not be confused with the Fredericksburg Dog Fair: a former charitable event held in Fredericksburg.
