= Fredericksburg Gun Manufactory Site =

Archaeological site in Virginia, United States

- Fredericksburg Gun Manufactory
- U.S. National Register of Historic Places
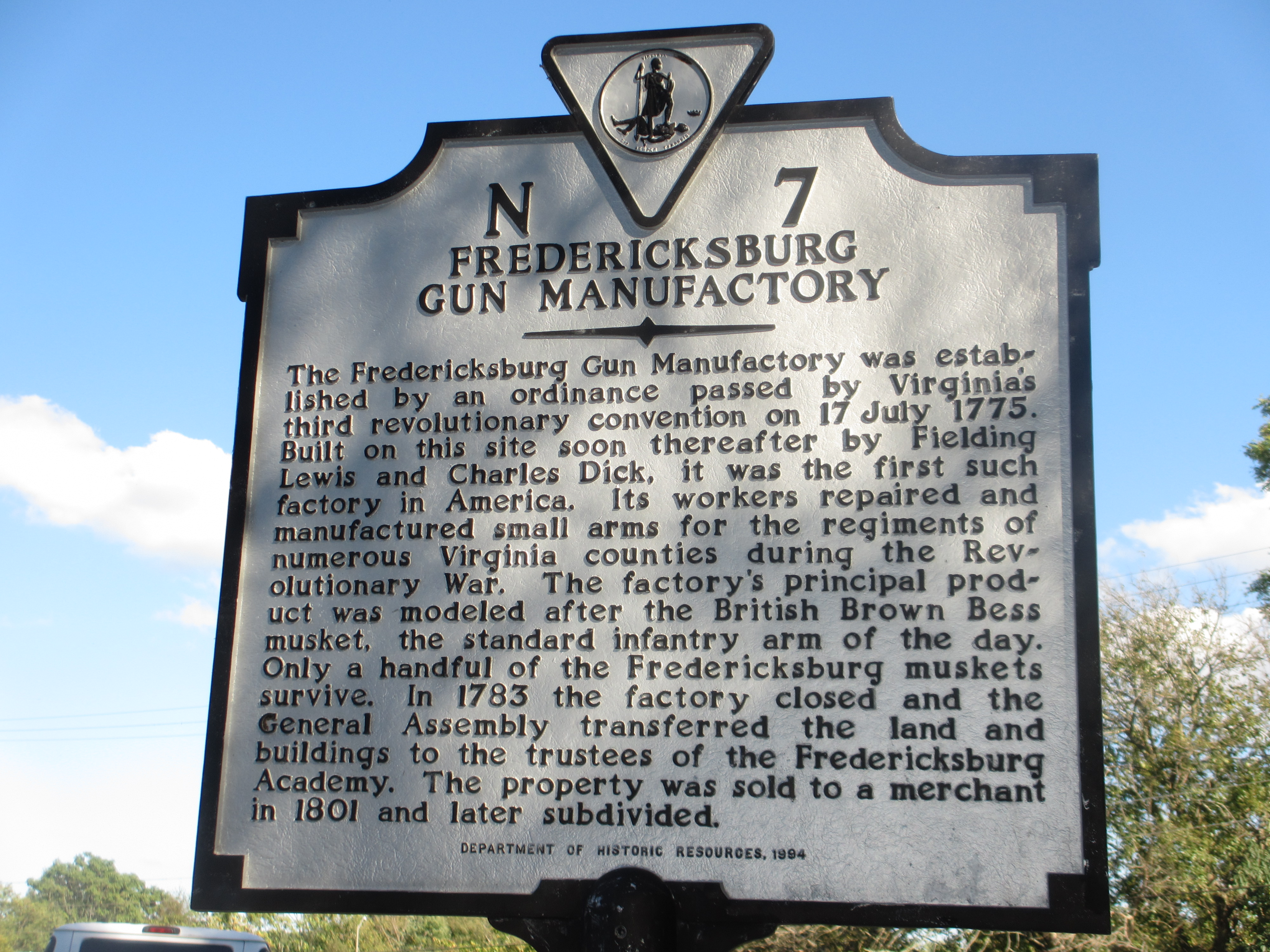
- Location: Fredericksburg, Virginia
- Area: 6 acres (2.4 ha)
- Built: 1781
- Built by: Fielding Lewis
- NRHP reference No.: 78003184
- Added to NRHP: November 14, 1978

The Fredericksburg Gun Manufactory Site is a historic archaeological site in Fredericksburg, Virginia. The manufactory was founded in 1775 by Charles Dick and Fielding Lewis, proprietor of the nearby Kenmore Plantation, and brother-in-law to George Washington, to provide guns and ammunition to the Continental Army and state militia during the American Revolutionary War. Lewis in particular invested more than £7000 in the endeavour, for which he was never compensated by either the state or the Continental Congress. The factory was closed at the end of the war.

The site was listed on the National Register of Historic Places in 1978.

== See also ==
- National Register of Historic Places listings in Fredericksburg, Virginia
