= St. George's Episcopal Church (Fredericksburg, Virginia) =

Church in Virginia, United States

Coordinates: 38°18′9.5″N 77°27′35.6″W

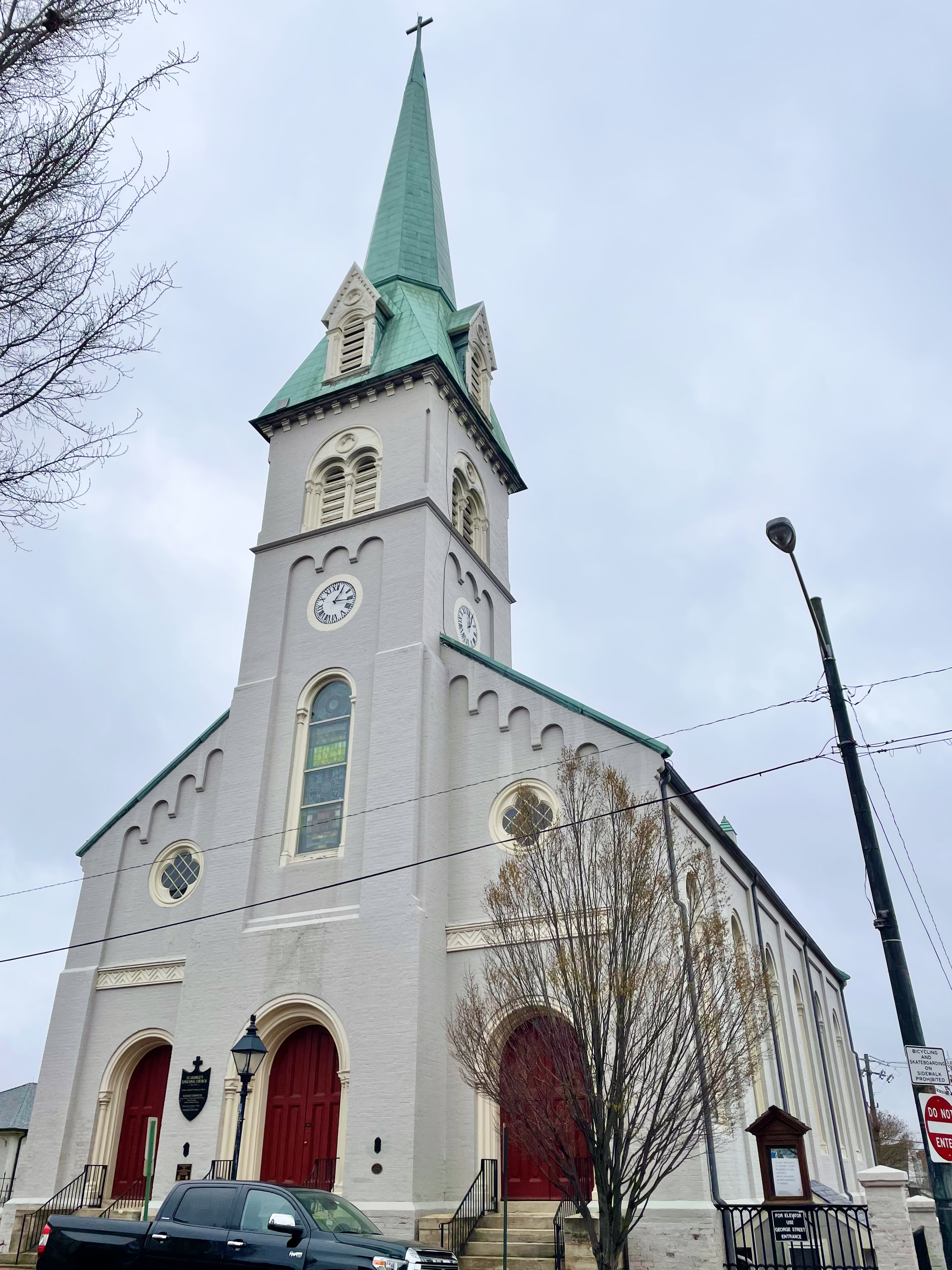
Exterior view, March 2023

St. George's Episcopal Church is a church in Fredericksburg, Virginia at 905 Princess Anne Street. The church, built in the 18th century and re-built in 1815 and 1849, is a part of the Episcopal Diocese of Virginia. The building was listed on the National Register of Historic Places in 2019.

== History ==
An area of land was designated as "St. George's Parish" as early as 1720, but construction of a church building was not begun until 1732. The wooden frame church was completed in 1741. Mary Ball Washington, the mother of George Washington, and her family living in the area, attended this old St. George's.

St. George's joined the new Protestant Episcopal Church of the United States in 1789.

A new building, in brick, replaced the old wooden church in 1815, but that was itself replaced by the present building in 1849.

During the Battle of Fredericksburg (1862), the church was damaged by cannon fire; it was also used as a command post for the Union Army when they took the city.

The church has been continuously developed, including the addition of side galleries (1854), the town clock and installation of striking stained glass windows (some by Tiffany) at various times (1885–1943). The original pews are still in use, but there have been various refurbishments and restorations to the altar and the chancel, as well as to the buildings on the surrounding site such as the parish hall, classroom wing (McGuire Hall) and the church building itself. The organ (By Parsons Pipe Organ Builders) was constructed for the parish during renovations completed in 2009.

== St. George's today ==
The church is an active, thriving, and inclusive parish of the Episcopal Diocese of Virginia with a wide range of services, activities and events. Visitors are welcome, and the church is open for prayer and meditation daily from 9 am to 5 pm. On Sunday, the building remains open until approximately 6 pm. Sunday services are at 7:45 am, 9 am, and 11:15 am. A Celtic service is held at 5:30 pm each Sunday and Compline is at 8 pm (compline is not offered during the summer). During summer, services are at 7:45 am and 10 am.

The Rector is the Reverend Joe Hensley, who came from St. Luke's Episcopal Church in Durham, N.C. in early 2015.

== See also ==
- Saint George: Devotions, traditions and prayers
- National Register of Historic Places listings in Fredericksburg, Virginia
