= Clarence Williams (musician) =

American jazz pianist, composer, producer, and publisher (1898 or 1893–1965)

Background information
- Born: October 1893 or 1898; Plaquemine, Louisiana, U.S.
- Died: November 6, 1965 (age 67 or 72) Queens, New York City
- Genres: Jazz
- Occupations: Musician; composer
- Instrument: Piano
- Spouse: Eva Taylor (m. 1921)

Clarence Williams (October 8, 1898 or October 6, 1893 – November 6, 1965) was an American jazz pianist, composer, promoter, vocalist, theatrical producer, and publisher.

== Biography ==
Williams was born in Plaquemine, Louisiana, to Dennis, a bassist, and Sally Williams, and ran away from home at age 12 to join Billy Kersands' Traveling Minstrel Show, then moved to New Orleans. At first, Williams worked shining shoes and doing odd jobs, but he soon became known as a singer and master of ceremonies. By the early 1910s, he was a well-regarded local entertainer also playing piano, and was composing new tunes by 1913. Williams was a good businessman and worked arranging and managing entertainment at the local African American vaudeville theater, as well as at various saloons and dance halls around Rampart Street, and at clubs and houses in Storyville.

Williams started a music publishing business with violinist/bandleader Armand J. Piron in 1915, which by the 1920s was the leading African-American owned music publisher in the country. He toured briefly with W. C. Handy, set up a publishing office in Chicago, then settled in New York in the early 1920s. In 1921, Williams married blues singer and stage actress Eva Taylor, with whom he would frequently perform. They moved to Queens in the 1920s with the intention of creating a community of black artists. He envisioned a space where African-American artists could live, work, and collaborate together, free from the racial discrimination and segregation that was prevalent in other parts of the city at the time.

Williams and his wife, Eva Taylor, purchased a large house on Ruscoe Street (108th Ave near Addisleigh Park) and turned it into a gathering place for black artists, musicians, and intellectuals. They hosted regular parties and events, which attracted many notable figures from the Harlem Renaissance, including Langston Hughes, Zora Neale Hurston, and Duke Ellington.

== Harlem Renaissance ==
He was one of the primary pianists on scores of blues records recorded in New York during the 1920s. He supervised African American recordings (the 8000 race series) for the New York offices of Okeh phonograph company in the 1920s in the Gaiety Theatre office building in Times Square. He recruited many of the artists who performed on the label. He also recorded extensively, leading studio bands frequently for OKeh, Columbia and occasionally other record labels.

He mostly used "Clarence Williams' Jazz Kings" for his hot band sides and "Clarence Williams' Washboard Five" for his washboard sides. He also produced and participated in early recordings by Louis Armstrong, Sidney Bechet, Bessie Smith, Virginia Liston, Irene Scruggs, his niece Katherine Henderson, and others. Two of his 1924 recording bands, "The Red Onion Jazz Babies" and "Clarence Williams' Blue Five" featured cornetist Armstrong and soprano saxophonist Bechet, two of the most important early jazz soloists, in their only recordings together before the 1940s. Clarence Williams' Blue Five, a studio band only, formed after the success of King Oliver's recordings in order to explore the market for blues-oriented music. The rivalry between Armstrong and Bechet, who tried to outdo each other with successive solo breaks, is exemplified in "Cake Walkin' Babies from Home", the most celebrated of these performances, which survives in versions recorded by both bands. Although the narrative of a rivalry during these recordings is frequently discussed in scholarship, Armstrong and Bechet do have moments of friendly collaboration, such as the shared break in "Texas Moaner Blues." King Oliver played cornet on a number of Williams's late 1920s recordings. He was the recording director for the short-lived QRS Records label in 1928.

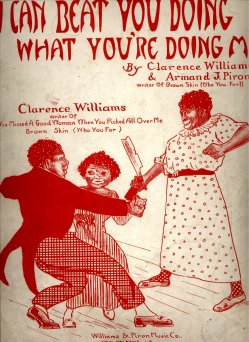
"I Can Beat You Doing What You're Doing Me" by Clarence Williams and Armand J. Piron, 1915 sheet music cover

Most of his recordings were songs from his publishing house, which explains why he recorded tunes such as "Baby Won't You Please Come Home", "Close Fit Blues" and "Papa De-Da-Da" numerous times. Among his own compositions was "Shout, Sister, Shout" (1929), which was recorded by him, and also covered by the Boswell Sisters, in 1931.

== Labels ==
In 1933, he signed to the Vocalion label, with the recordings mostly featuring washboard percussion, through 1935 (and a session in 1938). He also recorded for Bluebird in 1937, and again in 1941.

In 1943, Williams sold his extensive back-catalogue of tunes to Decca Records for $50,000 and retired, but then bought a bargain used-goods store, the Harlem Thrift Shop. Williams died in Queens, New York City, in 1965, and was interred in Saint Charles Cemetery in Farmingdale on Long Island. On her death in 1977, his wife, Eva Taylor, was interred next to him.

== Personal life ==
Clarence Williams' grandson was actor Clarence Williams III.

== Work ==
Clarence Williams' name appears as composer or co-composer on numerous tunes, including a number which by Williams' own admission were written by others but which Williams bought all rights to outright, as was a common practice in the music publishing business at the time.

In 1927, he wrote the music and book for his musical Bottomland, which starred his wife Eva Taylor. It was a flop that played in New York's Princess Theatre from June 27 to July 13. He later recorded some of its musical numbers with Clarence Williams' Orchestra and Clarence Williams' Jazz Kings.

Clarence Williams was also credited as the author of Hank Williams' 1949 hit "My Bucket's Got a Hole in It", a song that was later recorded by Louis Armstrong. In 1970, Williams was posthumously inducted into the Songwriters Hall of Fame.

=== Songs ===
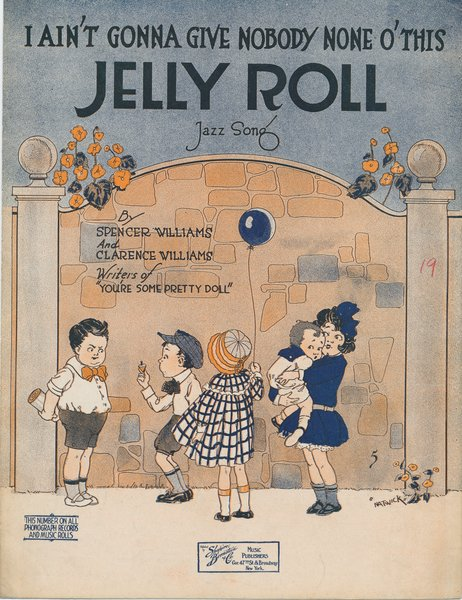
Sheet music cover

- "I Wish I Could Shimmy Like My Sister Kate" (as publisher – not composer, suspected to be originally Armstrong's "Katie's Head" bought by Piron and Williams)
- "I Ain't Gonna Give Nobody None o' this Jelly-Roll" (with Spencer Williams, 1919)
- "Sugar Blues" (1919)
- "Baby Won't You Please Come Home" (1919)
- "Royal Garden Blues" (with Spencer Williams, 1919)
- "Ain't Nobody's Business If I Do" (and others, 1922)
- "Shout, Sister, Shout"
- "You Missed A Good Woman"
- "That Ought To Do It"
- "Look What A Fool I've Been"
- "Got To Cool My Doggies Now"
- "I Can Beat You Doing What You're Doing Me"
- "Need a Little Sugar in My Bowl" (1931)
- "My Bucket's Got a Hole in It" (1933)

== Discography ==
- 1921–24 – The Chronological (Classics 679, ?)
- 1924–26 – The Chronological (Classics 695, ?)
- 1926–27 – The Chronological (Classics 718, ?)
- 1927–00 – The Chronological (Classics 736, ?)
- 1928–29 – The Chronological (Classics 771, ?)
- 1929–00 – The Chronological (Classics 791, ?)
- 1930–31 – The Chronological (Classics 832, ?)
- 1933–00 – The Chronological (Classics 845, ?)
- 1933–34 – The Chronological (Classics 871, ?)
- 1934–00 – The Chronological (Classics 891, ?)
- 1934–37 – The Chronological (Classics 918, ?)
- 1937–41 – The Chronological (Classics, ?)
