= Fredericksburg Baptist Church =

Historic church in Fredericksburg, Virginia, US

Coordinates: 38.304176°N 77.460702°W

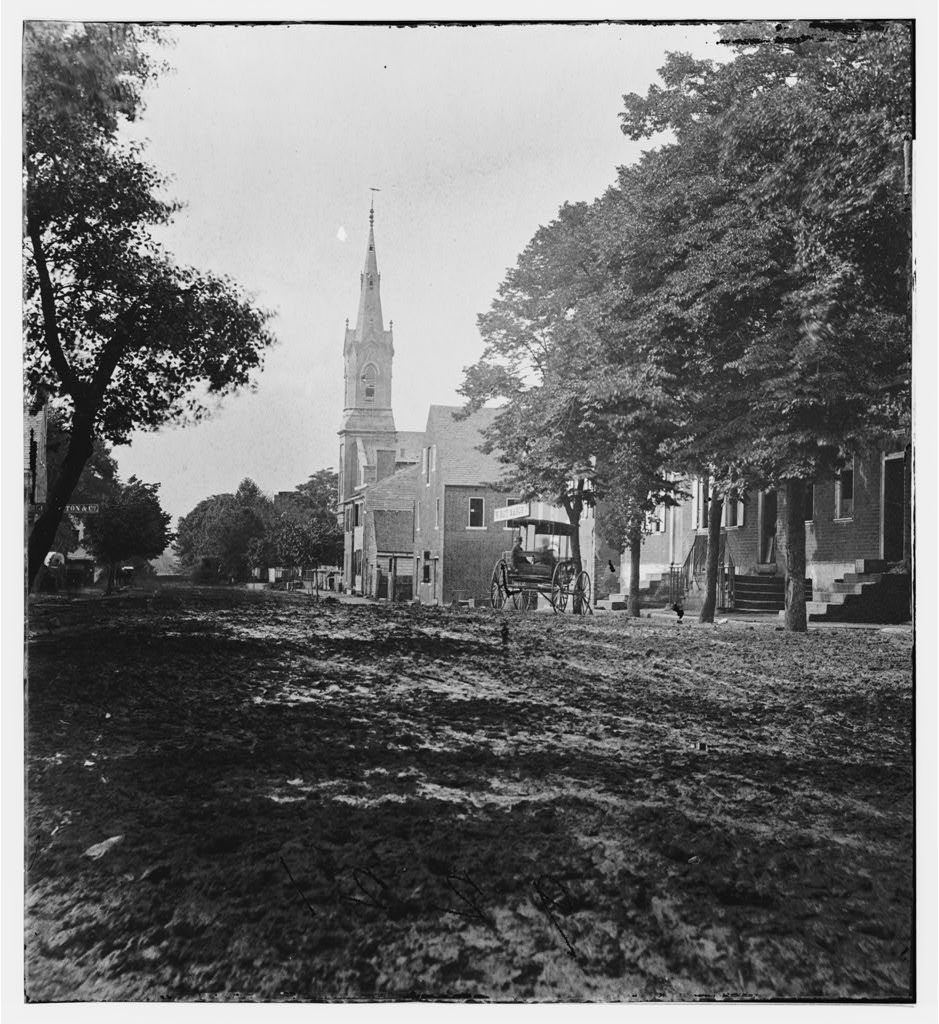
Fredericksburg, Virginia. View on Princess Anne Street showing Baptist church and 6th Corps hospital

Fredericksburg Baptist Church is a historic church founded in 1804 and located in the historic district of downtown Fredericksburg, Virginia.

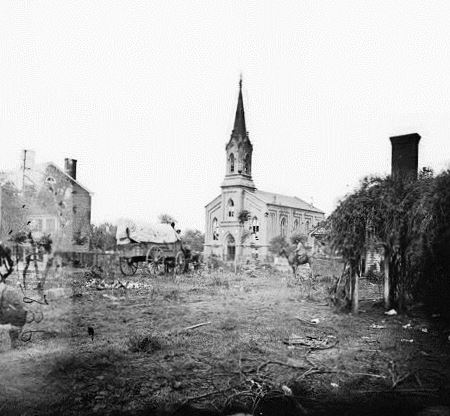
Fredericksburg Baptist Church during the American Civil War

== History ==
Founded in 1804, under the name of Shiloh and with origins dating back to the 18th century, Fredericksburg Baptist Church is one of a few historical churches located in the Fredericksburg Historic District.

Its first pastor was Andrew B. Broaddus (1770–1848) of Caroline County, Virginia, who was a renowned minister of his day and "declared the most eloquent man that ever spoke within the walls of the Capitol]."

== See also ==
- Shiloh Baptist Church (Old Site)
- Shiloh Baptist Church (Washington, D.C.)
