= Need a Little Sugar in My Bowl =

1931 dirty blues song

Song by Bessie Smith
- Released: 1931
- Genre: Blues
- Label: Columbia
- Songwriters: Clarence Williams, J. Tim Brymn, Dally Small

"Need a Little Sugar in My Bowl" is a dirty blues song first recorded in 1931 by Bessie Smith and released by Columbia Records. It was written by Clarence Williams, J. Tim Brymn, and Dally Small. Owing to its sexually suggestive lyrics, it has been rated as one of the best double entendre songs of all time. In 1967, Nina Simone released "I Want a Little Sugar in My Bowl", which referenced lyrics from the original 1931 song.

== Versions ==
=== Original ===
The song was first recorded by Bessie Smith in November 1931 in New York City. It was released by Columbia Records as disc 14634-D. It was written by Clarence Williams, J. Tim Brymn, and Dally Small. Williams also accompanied Smith on piano. The song was Smith's final recording under her contract with Columbia. The song initially employs innuendo and metaphor, but eventually becomes relatively overt in its sexual implications.

The song has been re-issued on multiple vinyl and compact disc editions, including Bessie Smith: The Greatest Blues Singer (1970), The Complete Recordings, Vol. 5: The Final Chapter (1996), The Essential Bessie Smith (1997), Martin Scorsese Presents the Blues: Bessie Smith (2003), Empress of the Blues, Vol, 2: 1926–1933 (2008), and The Complete Columbia Recordings (2012).

=== Covers ===
Nina Simone recorded "I Want a Little Sugar in My Bowl" many times, including as the B-side of her Colpix single "I Got It Bad" in 1962 and on her 1967 album Nina Simone Sings the Blues. While Simone's version changes the lyrics slightly, it has been described as "a first-person representation of empowered female sexuality."

The song has been covered by many performers, including Christina Aguilera, Thelma Houston, Hadda Brooks, Gaye Adegbalola, Helen Schneider, Rory Block, Sandra Reaves, and Lavay Smith & Her Red Hot Skillet Lickers.

In 2010, the song was also included in a "nearly show-stealing performance" by E. Faye Butler as part of a ballet interpretation of The Great Gatsby, staged at the John F. Kennedy Center for the Performing Arts. The song was also included in the stage production, The Devil's Music: The Life and Blues of Besse Smith.

== Lyrics ==
The song is often remembered for its sexually suggestive lyrics, in which Smith pleads with her "hard papa", saying that she needs "a little sugar, in my bowl, doggone it". Continuing the double entendre, the song also expresses the need for "a little hot dog between my rolls" and concludes, "Stop your foolin' and drop somethin' in my bowl."

In an article published in the journal American Music, ethnomusicologist Henrietta Yurchenco praised the song as an early example of a female performer speaking "in clear, plain language about the joys of sex."
