= Elmhurst (Wellsburg, West Virginia) =

Historic house in West Virginia, United States

- U.S. National Register of Historic Places
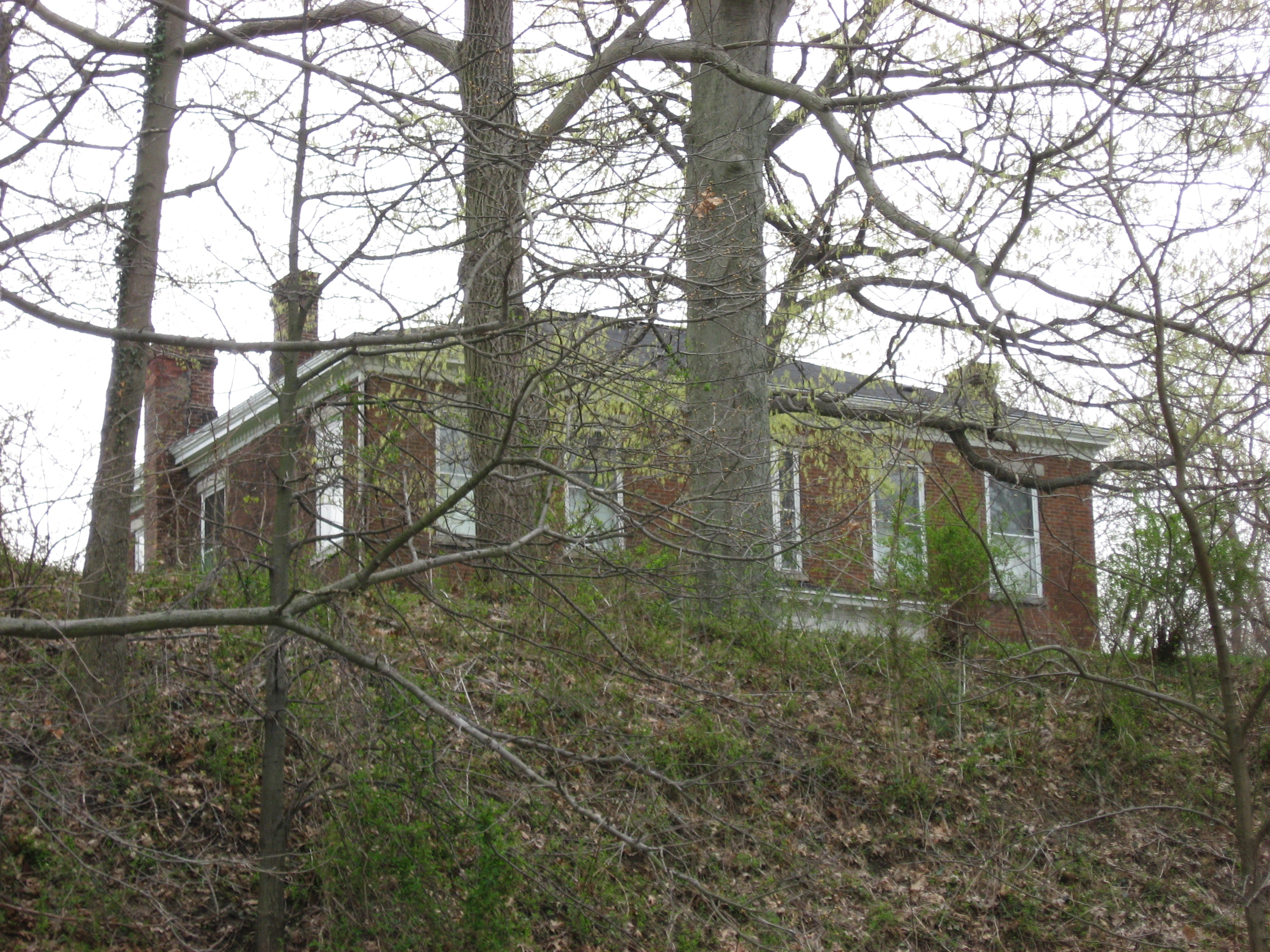
- Elmhurst, April 2011

- Location within West Virginia Location within the United States
- Location: 1606 Pleasant Ave., Wellsburg, West Virginia
- Coordinates: 40°16′47″N 80°36′22″W
- Area: 3.3 acres (1.3 ha)
- Built: 1848
- Architectural style: Greek Revival
- MPS: Pleasant Avenue MRA
- NRHP reference No.: 86001072
- Added to NRHP: May 16, 1986

Elmhurst, also known as the William H. Tarr House or William and Carol Lynn Residence, is a historic country home located at Wellsburg, Brooke County, West Virginia. It was built in 1848, and is a two-story, five-bay, rectangular brick dwelling with a hipped roof in the Greek Revival style. It sits on a stone ashlar foundation and features a single bay portico with a hipped roof supported by Tuscan order columns. Also on the property is a contributing small barn.

It was listed on the National Register of Historic Places in 1986.
