= Matthew Fontaine Maury School =

Historic school building in Virginia, US

- U.S. National Register of Historic Places
- Virginia Landmarks Register
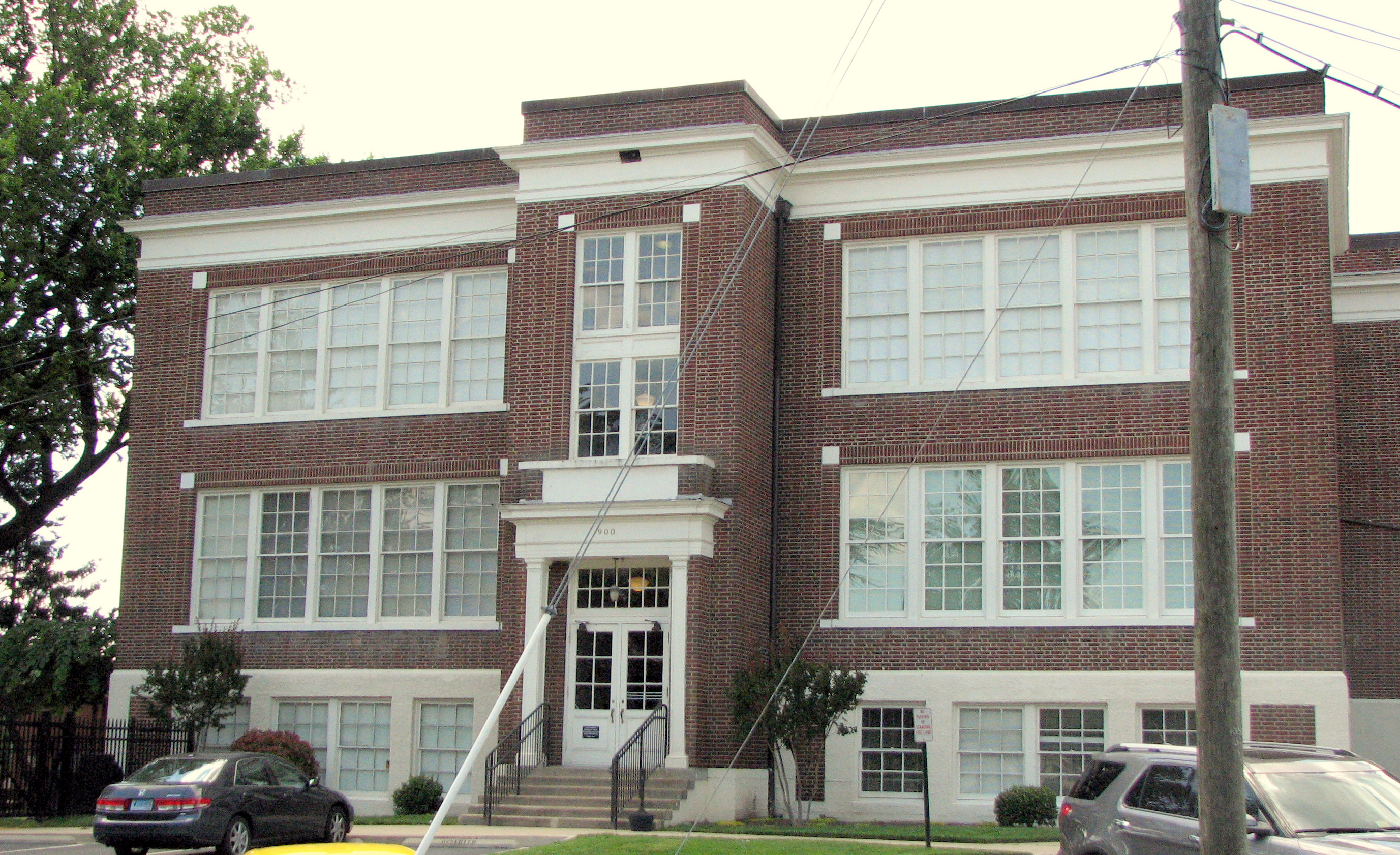
- Matthew Fontaine Maury School, Fredericksburg, Virginia

- Location within Northern Virginia Location within Virginia Location within the United States
- Location: 900 Barton Street, Fredericksburg, Virginia
- Coordinates: 38°18′02″N 77°27′53″W
- Area: 7.4 acres (3.0 ha)
- Built: 1920
- Architect: Stern, Philip Nathaniel
- Architectural style: Colonial Revival
- NRHP reference No.: 07000133
- VLR No.: 111-0009-0014

Significant dates
- Added to NRHP: March 7, 2007
- Designated VLR: September 6, 2006

The Matthew Fontaine Maury School (also known as Maury School), in Fredericksburg, Virginia, is an historic school building noted for its Colonial Revival architecture and design as well as its significance in the entertainment and cultural life of Fredericksburg. The architect of the building was Philip Stern. Built in 1919-1920, the school was used from then until 1952 for both elementary and high-school students. After the construction of James Monroe High School, the building was used as an elementary- and middle-school. The school was closed in 1980. Maury School was added to the National Register of Historic Places in March 2007.

== History ==
The school is located on in an area of Fredericksburg bounded by George, Kenmore, William and Barton streets. The site had been previously used as a potter's field and an African-American cemetery. Prior to construction, the graves were relocated to Shiloh Cemetery in Fredericksburg. The original school building was Fredericksburg High School. It consisted of one building facing George Street. An auditorium was added to the school in 1930.

In 1937, the school was enlarged with the addition of James Monroe Elementary School, a separate building connected by a covered walk, and the name was changed to James Monroe High School. In 1952, when the city built a new high school, the building was renamed Matthew Fontaine Maury School and served as the city's middle school until it was closed in 1980. After the school was closed, it was used for several years by the Fredericksburg Police Academy and, later, as a homeless shelter. In 2007, the Maury School building was converted into condominia. The Central Rappahannock Heritage Center is located in the old gymnasium of the building. The center is an all-volunteer, non-profit regional archive dedicated to the preservation of historical documents and photographs relating to the history and people of the City of Fredericksburg and the counties of Caroline, King George, Spotsylvania and Stafford.

== Maury stadium ==
Included in the Historic Places designation is the school's stadium. This stadium was built in 1935 and, despite the construction of two different high schools to replace it, James Monroe High School sports teams continue to use it for home games. On the slope between the school and the field, bleachers of stepped-concrete bleachers were built. A brick balustrade forms the edge of the spectators' area.

The stadium has been called "the City Stadium". It is the largest public gathering place in Fredericksburg. It is the venue for concerts and other community events. The stadium was also home to the Fredericksburg Dog Mart. The Dog Mart began with a 1698 agreement between the village that was to become Fredericksburg and the Manahoac Indian tribe. Held each year, this event brought as many as 15,000 people to the school.

== Matthew Fontaine Maury ==
The school is named for Matthew Fontaine Maury (1806–1873), a Spotsylvania County, Virginia native who was known as the "Pathfinder of the Seas". Maury studied ocean currents and published the first reliable oceanographic charts. Maury was involved in the founding of the United States Naval Academy at Annapolis, Maryland and taught at the Virginia Military Institute.

== Design and construction ==
Maury School reflects a Colonial Revival-style architecture. The school is made up of three matching buildings with 65,000 square feet of space. The first building opened in 1920 and was called Fredericksburg High School. The school was designed to serve white students in grades 7 - 12. In 1930 an auditorium and gym were added. An identical building was built in 1937 to house elementary school students and is connected by a covered walkway. The architect of the buildings was Philip Nathaniel Stern (1878–1960) of Fredericksburg, who was also architect for many of the buildings at what is now the University of Mary Washington. Historian and writer Jack D. Warren Jr. called Maury School "the best example of institutional Colonial Revival architecture in Fredericksburg".
