= Edward Elmhirst =

English vicar, rector, and cricketer

Edward Elmhirst (26 November 1811 – 12 November 1893) was an English cricketer who played in 15 matches between 1834 and 1853 that are considered to have been first-class. Among the teams that he played first-class games for were Cambridge University and the Gentlemen of England. He was born at Bag Enderby, Lincolnshire and died at Shawell, Leicestershire.

Though his record is not impressive by modern standards, Elmhirst batted mostly in the middle order, and sometimes as an opening batsman, but it is not recorded whether he was right- or left-handed; he also kept wicket in some games.

Elmhirst was ordained as a Church of England vicar after he left Trinity College, Cambridge in 1835 and served as rector of Shawell from 1841 until his death. Elmhirst was credited with coaching a local youth from Lutterworth, John King, who had a long cricket career for Leicestershire and played also for England.
