= Farmers Bank of Fredericksburg =

Historic commercial building in Virginia, United States

- U.S. National Register of Historic Places
- Virginia Landmarks Register
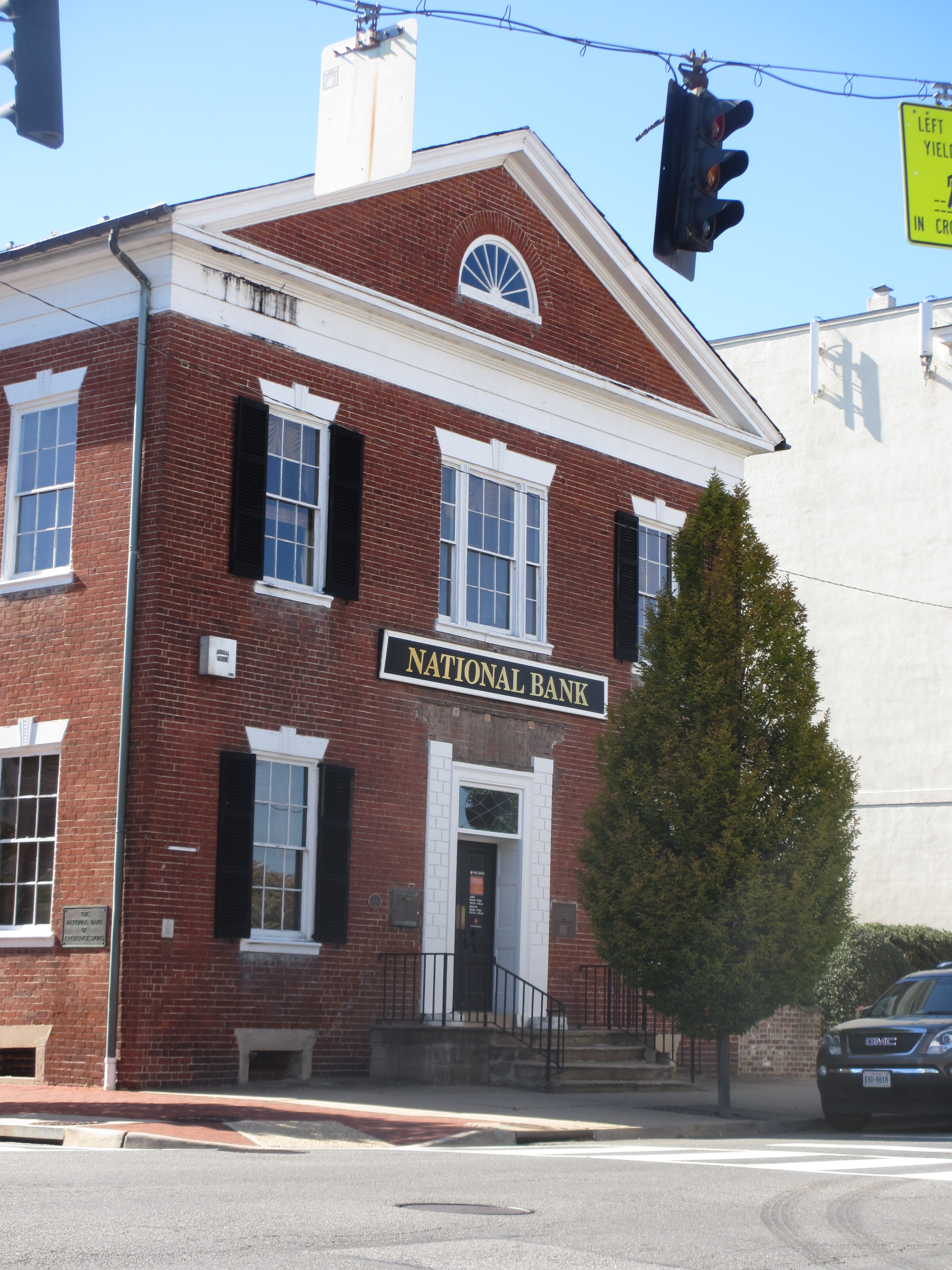
- Farmers Bank of Fredericksburg, September 2012

- Location within Northern Virginia Location within Virginia Location within the United States
- Location: 900 Princess Anne St., Fredericksburg, Virginia
- Coordinates: 38°18′8″N 77°27′40″W
- Area: 0.5 acres (0.20 ha)
- Built: 1819-1820
- Built by: Ellis, Robert & George
- Architectural style: Federal
- NRHP reference No.: 83003283
- VLR No.: 111-0021

Significant dates
- Added to NRHP: August 11, 1983
- Designated VLR: January 18, 1983

Farmers Bank of Fredericksburg, also known as The National Bank of Fredericksburg, is a historic bank building located at Fredericksburg, Virginia. It was built in 1819–20, and is a 2 1/2-story, rectangular red-brick building in the Federal style. It features a slate-covered front gable roof with a lunette window in the front pediment, wide cornice, three pairs of brick chimneys, and engaged pedestal columns with full entablature on the front facade. The front portion of the main floor had been used as a banking house since its construction, while the rooms at the rear and those on the second floor housed the bank's cashiers and their families from 1820 to 1920. In 2016, after completing renovations to the inside of the building, the building was converted into a restaurant while keeping the existing bank vault as a private dining area.

It was listed on the National Register of Historic Places in 1983.
