= Elmhurst, Virginia =

Neighborhood in Norfolk, Virginia, United States

Coordinates: 36°53′01″N 76°13′49″W

Elmhurst is a neighborhood in the independent city of Norfolk in the State of Virginia in the United States of America. It is located at latitude 36°53'3" North, longitude 76°13'50" West.

Elmhurst neighborhood has more Jamaican and Haitian ancestry people living in it than nearly any neighborhood in America. 3.9% of this neighborhood's residents have Jamaican ancestry and 1.7% have Haitian ancestry.
