= Sentry Box =

Historic house in Virginia, United States

- U.S. National Register of Historic Places
- U.S. Historic district – Contributing property
- Virginia Landmarks Register
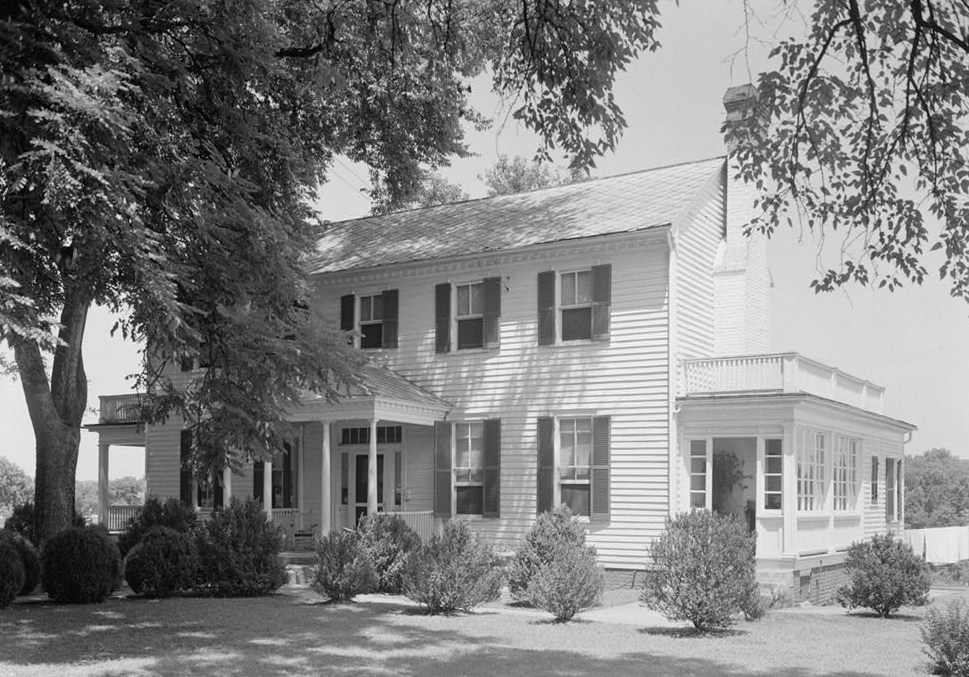
- Sentry Box House, HABS Photo

- Location within Northern Virginia Location within Virginia Location within the United States
- Location: 133 Caroline St., Fredericksburg, Virginia
- Coordinates: 38°17′43″N 77°27′15″W
- Area: less than one acre
- Built: 1786
- Architectural style: Colonial Revival, Georgian, Greek Revival
- NRHP reference No.: 90002135
- VLR No.: 111-0095

Significant dates
- Added to NRHP: February 26, 1992
- Designated VLR: April 17, 1990

Sentry Box is a historic home located at Fredericksburg, Virginia. It was built in 1786, and is a large two-story, five-bay, Georgian style frame dwelling with Colonial Revival and Greek Revival-style details. It has a central-passage plan and side gable roof. Also on the property is a contributing icehouse.

It was listed on the National Register of Historic Places in 1992. It is located in the Fredericksburg Historic District.
