= Elmhurst, Aylesbury =

Coordinates: 51.826135°N 0.807969°W

Elmhurst
- Location within Buckinghamshire
- OS grid reference: SP8214
- Civil parish: Aylesbury
- Unitary authority: Buckinghamshire
- Ceremonial county: Buckinghamshire
- Region: South East
- Country: England
- Sovereign state: United Kingdom
- Post town: AYLESBURY
- Postcode district: HP20, HP21
- Dialling code: 01296
- Police: Thames Valley
- Fire: Buckinghamshire
- Ambulance: South Central
- UK Parliament: Aylesbury

Elmhurst is a neighbourhood in north Aylesbury in Buckinghamshire, England. It occupies the area to the north and south of Elmhurst Road, now a section of the town's ring road.

Elmhurst is mainly residential and has a very small shopping area on Dunsham Lane and another next to the Buckingham Road junction. Most of the housing consists of terraced council housing and blocks of low-rise flats.

== Education ==
Elmhurst has two state schools, The Elmhurst School, on Dunsham Lane situated next to the Alfred Rose Park, and St Louis Catholic Combined School, located on the edge of the estate near Bierton Road.

=== St Louis Catholic Combined School ===
St Louis Catholic Combined School

Location
- Harris Court; Aylesbury, Buckinghamshire, HP21 2XZ; England

Information
- Type: Voluntary aided school
- Motto: Latin: Ut Sint Unum; That They May Be One
- Religious affiliation: Roman Catholic
- Established: 1945
- Local authority: Buckinghamshire
- Department for Education URN: 110480 Tables
- Ofsted: Reports
- Headteacher: Margaret Louisy
- Staff: 24
- Gender: Coeducational
- Age: 4 to 11
- Enrolment: 238
- Houses: 4
- Diocese: Northampton
- Dedication: Saint Louis IX of France
- Website: http://www.stlouisrccschool.co.uk/

St Louis Catholic Combined School is a voluntary aided Roman Catholic primary school in Aylesbury, Buckinghamshire. It is a coeducational school which takes children from the age of 4 through to the age of 11 and has 238 pupils. It was founded in 1945 by a group of French nuns of the Sisters of St Louis order.
