= Elmhurst School, Croydon =

Coordinates: 51.36389°N 0.09224°W

Elmhurst School
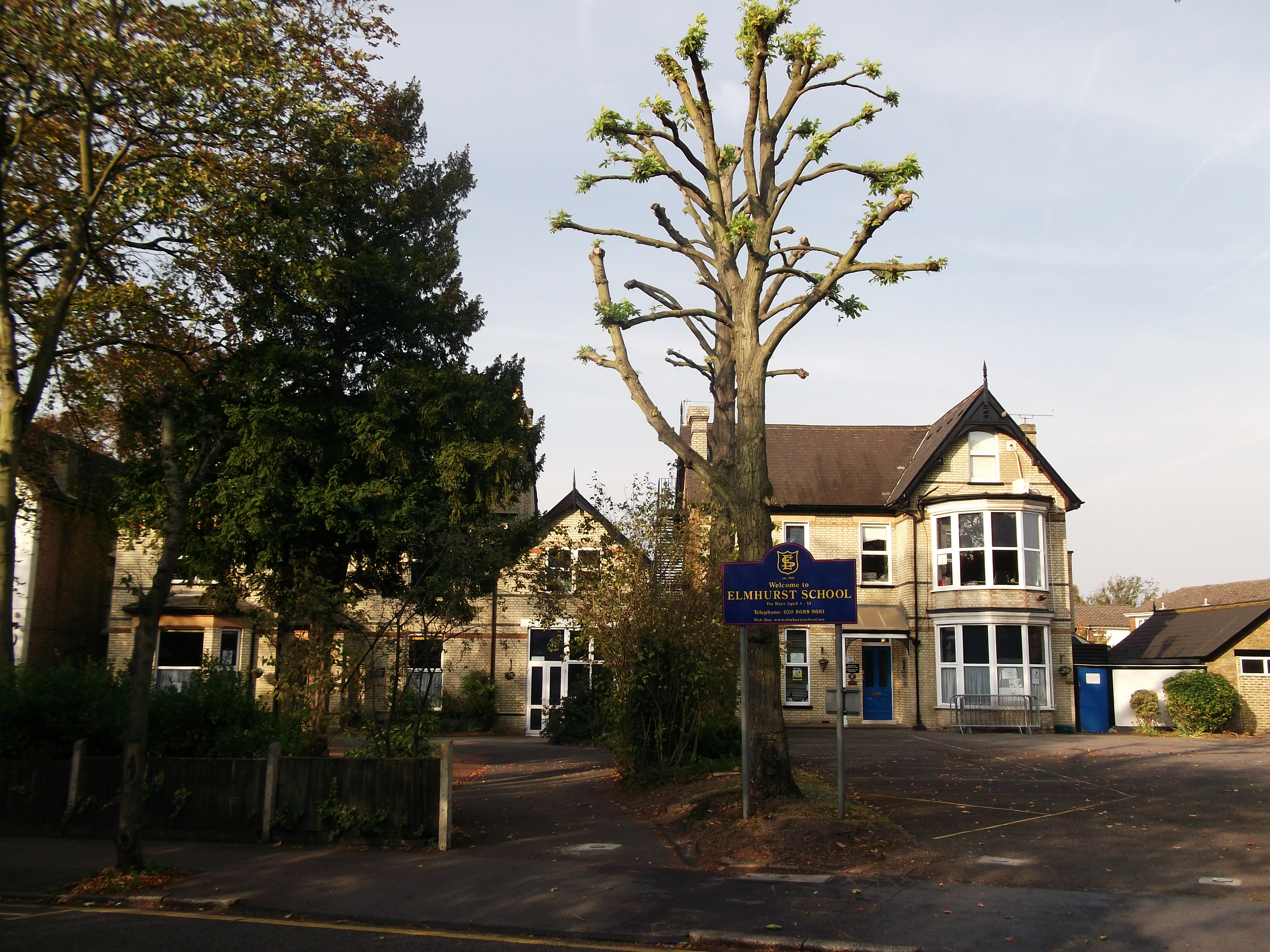
- Elmhurst School, South Croydon

Location
- 44-48 South Park Hill Road; South Croydon, Surrey, CR2 7DW; England

Information
- Established: 1869; 157 years ago
- Head teacher: Sara Marriott
- Gender: co-education
- Houses: Scott; Peachell; Squire; Anderson
- Website: www.elmhurstschool.net

Elmhurst School is a private 11+ preparatory and pre-preparatory school for children aged 3–11 years located in South Croydon, England. It is the successor to two schools both founded in 1869.

== History ==
The school has its origins in two educational establishments dating from 1869. In that year Allen Carr and his wife opened a school for young boys in Croydon. He died in 1875 and his widow, Elizabeth, continued the school. In 1885 she bought an empty property called "Elmhurst" in St Peter's Road, South Croydon, and moved the school there. The other 1869 foundation was opened by Clarissa Prince at her father's house, "The Chalet", Croydon. She was assisted by her sister Florence and others. In the 1880s their pupils included the young P.G. Wodehouse and his two elder brothers. In 1894 the sisters bought Elmhurst from Elizabeth Carr and moved their school there. They called their establishment "Elmhurst School, for the Sons of Gentlemen".

The previous Principal, Henry Wickham, who purchased the school in 2009, is the husband of the author Sophie Kinsella.

The current parent company is Bellevue Education International Limited, which bought the school from Wickham in October 2013.

Historically a boys school, from January 2024, the school began accepting girls in the nursery and will be fully co-educational from September 2024.

== Curriculum ==
The Elmhurst curriculum incorporates the National Curriculum, which is followed throughout the school at Key Stages 1 and 2 in Maths, English, Science and Technology (including Computer Studies), History, Geography, Art, Music and PE. The National Curriculum is extended by the school's own syllabus and schemes of work in these subjects. Religious Education is also taught with the emphasis on Moral Education, the principles being the same for all religions. French is taught throughout the school.

== School houses ==
Elmhurst School has four school houses: Scott (blue), Peachell (green) - formerly Leisk House, Squire (yellow) - formerly School House, Anderson (red) - formerly Seddon House. The names of the houses are the surnames of previous owners of the school.

== Notable old boys ==
- Sir Pelham G. Wodehouse (at Clarissa Price's predecessor school), humorist
- Tom Sharpe, satirical author
- The Baron Freeman, former Conservative MP and Chancellor of the Duchy of Lancaster
- Tarik O'Regan, composer
