= Rowe House (Fredericksburg, Virginia) =

Historic house in Virginia, United States

- U.S. National Register of Historic Places
- Virginia Landmarks Register
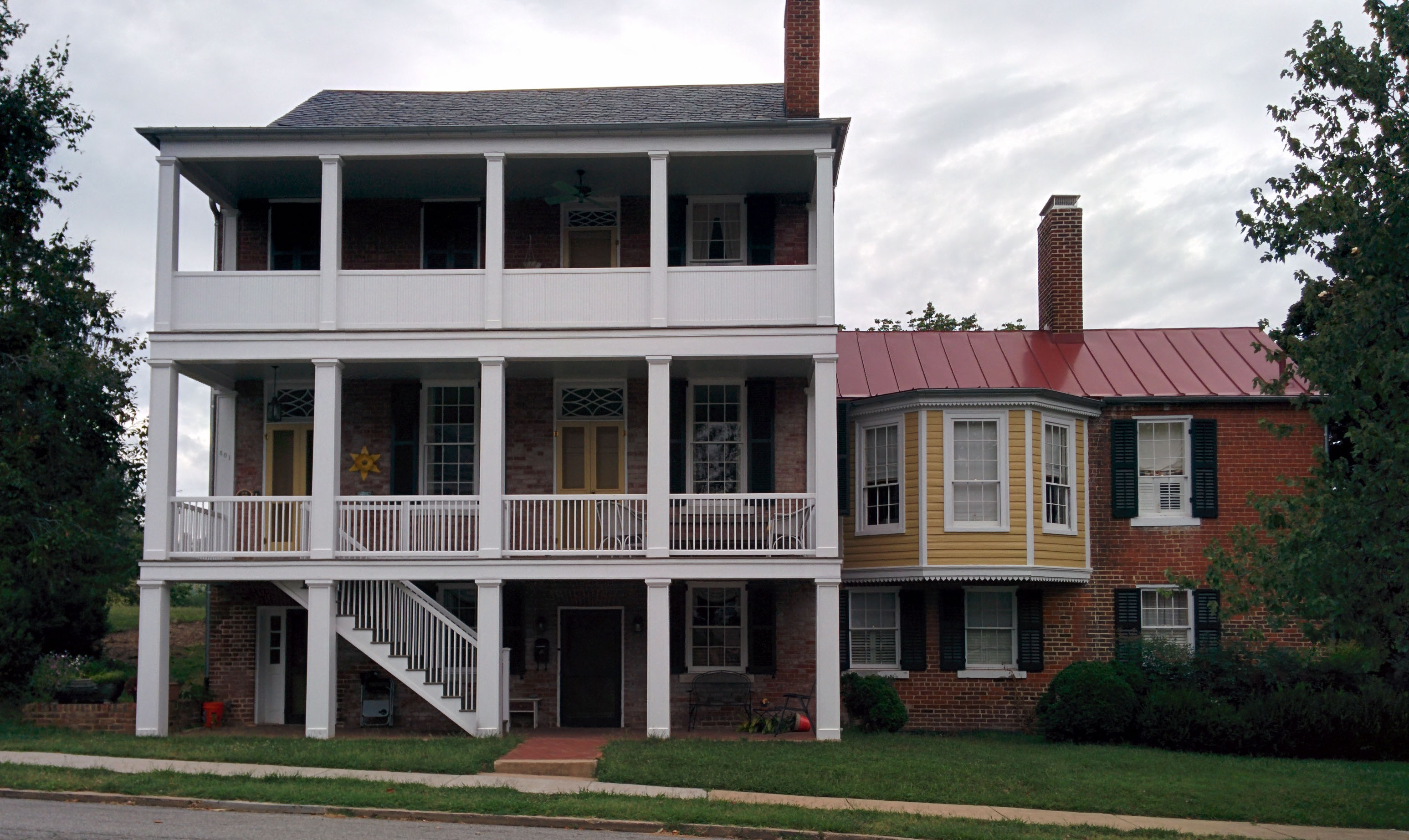
- Rowe House, September 2014

- Location within Northern Virginia Location within Virginia Location within the United States
- Location: 801 Hanover St., Fredericksburg, Virginia
- Coordinates: 38°18′1″N 77°27′58″W
- Area: 1 acre (0.40 ha)
- Built: 1828
- Architectural style: Federal, Greek Revival
- NRHP reference No.: 08001052
- VLR No.: 111-0107

Significant dates
- Added to NRHP: November 12, 2008
- Designated VLR: September 18, 2008

The Rowe House is a historic home located at Fredericksburg, Virginia. It was built in 1828, and is a two-story, four-bay, double-pile, side-passage-plan Federal style brick dwelling. It has an English basement, molded brick cornice, deep gable roof, and two-story front porch. Attached to the house is a one-story, brick, two-room addition, also with a raised basement, and a one-story, late 19th century frame wing. The interior features Greek Revival-style pattern mouldings. Also on the property is a garden storage building built in about 1950, that was designed to resemble a 19th-century smokehouse.

It was listed on the National Register of Historic Places in 2008.
