= Walker–Grant School =

Historic school building in Virginia, US

- U.S. National Register of Historic Places
- Virginia Landmarks Register
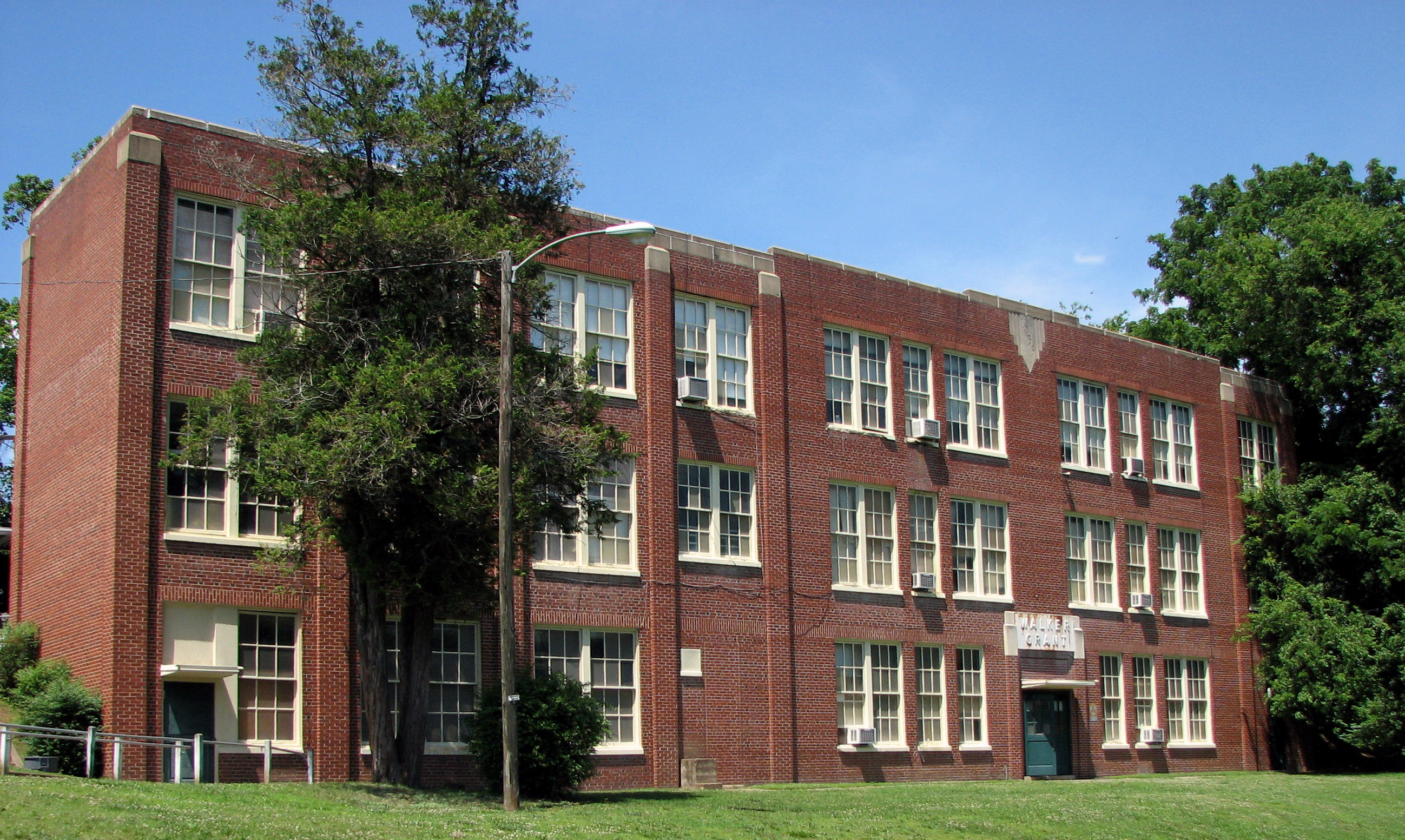
- Walker–Grant School (1935) in Fredericksburg, Virginia

- Location within Northern Virginia Location within Virginia Location within the United States
- Location: 2210 idlewild Blvd, Fredericksburg, Virginia, 22401
- Coordinates: 38°17′35″N 77°27′29″W
- Area: 3 acres (1.2 ha)
- Built: 1938
- Architectural style: Art Deco
- NRHP reference No.: 98001311
- VLR No.: 111-5006

Significant dates
- Added to NRHP: October 30, 1998
- Designated VLR: September 14, 1998

Walker–Grant School is a historic school in Fredericksburg, Virginia. The school was built in 1938 and was the first publicly supported black high school in Fredericksburg. The school was named for Joseph Walker (born 1854) and Jason Grant (1861–1951) who worked to establish the school. The Art Deco designed school was added to the National Register of Historic Places in October 1998.

== Joseph Walker and Jason Grant ==
Walker was born into slavery in Spotsylvania County, Virginia. He was owned by the Goodwin family. After being freed at the conclusion of the American Civil War, he held a variety of jobs in Caroline and Spotsylvania counties. In the 1870s he moved to Fredericksburg where he worked at a paper mill. Though he was almost entirely self-taught, and unable to read or write well, he had a strong interest in education.

Grant's father was a slave in Kentucky who fled to Chatham, Ontario, Canada to escape a whipping. Grant attended schools in Chatham, Pontiac, Michigan, and at the Wilberforce Educational Institute in Ohio. Grant met a teacher from Fredericksburg, Virginia while he was working as a waiter in New York. He was convinced to move to Fredericksburg to teach there. He taught mostly in country schools and was the principal of the Fredericksburg Colored School. In 1924 he retired after 42 years in education.

== History ==
Walker and Grant worked together with others to create the Fredericksburg Normal and Industrial Institute, the first high school for black people in Fredericksburg. The Institute opened in 1905 with 20 students, supported only by donations from residents and, thus, was not a public school. The school opened in the basement of the Shiloh Baptist Church.

In 1906, the Institute was moved to a farmhouse on land purchased in an area of Fredericksburg known as Moorefield. The name of the area was changed to Mayfield. A new building was constructed for the school in the 1920s with four classrooms, an office, science laboratory, cloak rooms and about 20 rooms for boarding students.

In time, the financial burden on the black community to support the growing and successful school became too great and by 1935 the school was struggling to survive. In 1938, the Fredericksburg Normal and Industrial Institute was made part of the city school system. The school was merged with the nearby black elementary school and the entire school was named Walker–Grant.

When the Fredericksburg school system was integrated in 1968, Walker–Grant became the city's middle school, serving white and black students. In 1988, Walker–Grant Middle School moved to a new building, retaining the same name. The original Walker–Grant building is still used by the Fredericksburg school system for administrative offices and the Head Start Program.
