= Presbyterian Church of Fredericksburg =

Historic church in Virginia, United States

- U.S. National Register of Historic Places
- Virginia Landmarks Register
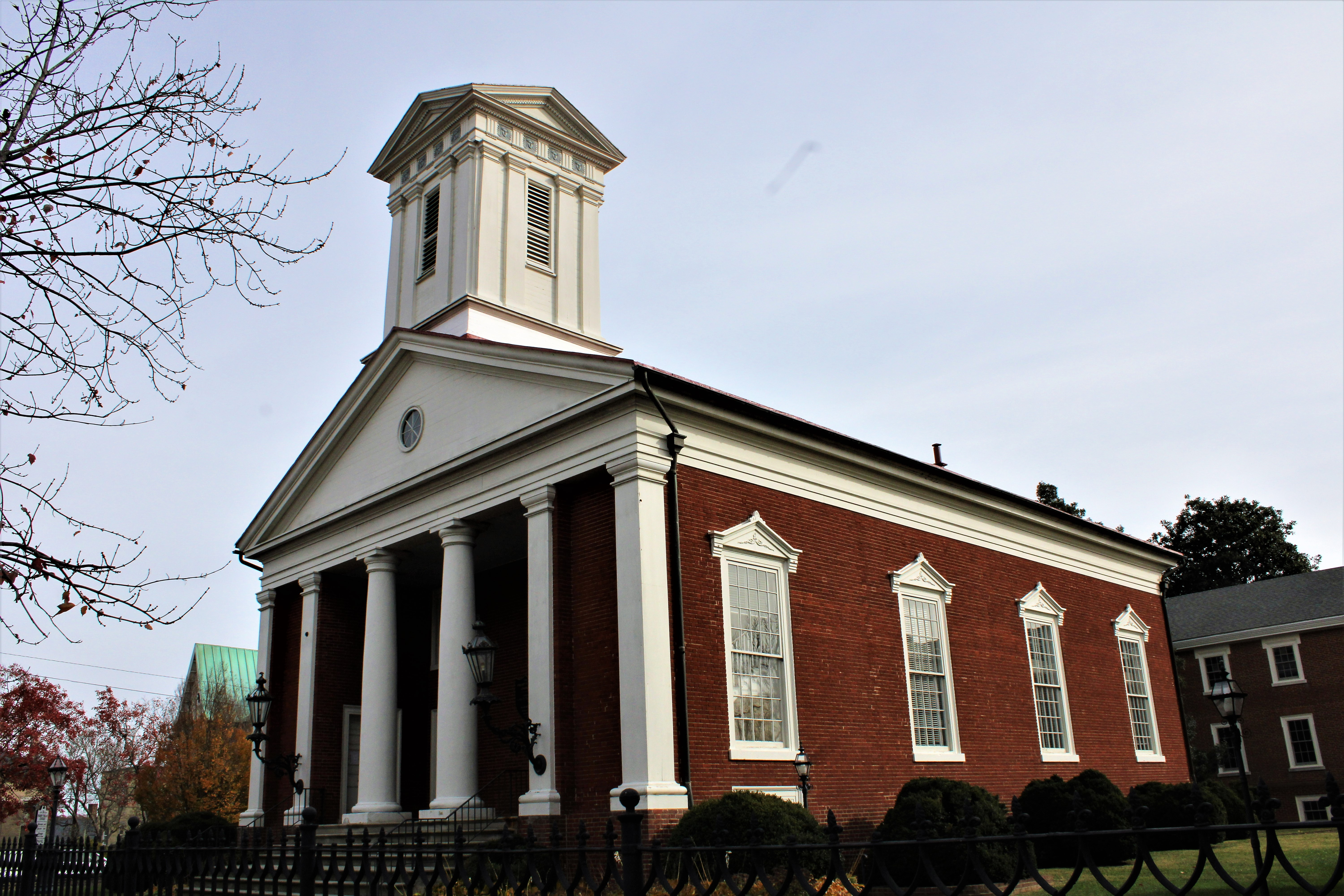
- Presbyterian Church of Fredericksburg, November 2021

- Location within Northern Virginia Location within Virginia Location within the United States
- Location: SW of Princess Anne and George Sts., Fredericksburg, Virginia
- Coordinates: 38°18′6″N 77°27′38″W
- Area: less than one acre
- Built: 1833
- Architectural style: Early Republic, Jeffersonian Roman Revival
- NRHP reference No.: 84003534
- VLR No.: 111-0034

Significant dates
- Added to NRHP: March 1, 1984
- Designated VLR: May 17, 1983

Presbyterian Church of Fredericksburg is a historic Presbyterian church located southwest of Princess Anne and George Streets in Fredericksburg, Virginia. It was built in 1833, and restored in 1866 after being badly damaged during the American Civil War. It is a rectangular brick church building of Jeffersonian Roman Revival design. The church has a triangular, gable-end pediment surmounting a wide entablature which surrounds the entire building. The front facade features four wide, wooden Doric order pilaster, and two round Doric order columns each set at the front edge of the recessed portico. During the American Civil War the church served both Union and Confederate soldiers and it was in this building that Clara Barton came to nurse the wounded after the Battle of Fredericksburg in 1862.

It was listed on the National Register of Historic Places in 1984.
