= Elmhurst (Fredericksburg, Virginia) =

Historic house in Virginia, United States

- U.S. National Register of Historic Places
- Virginia Landmarks Register
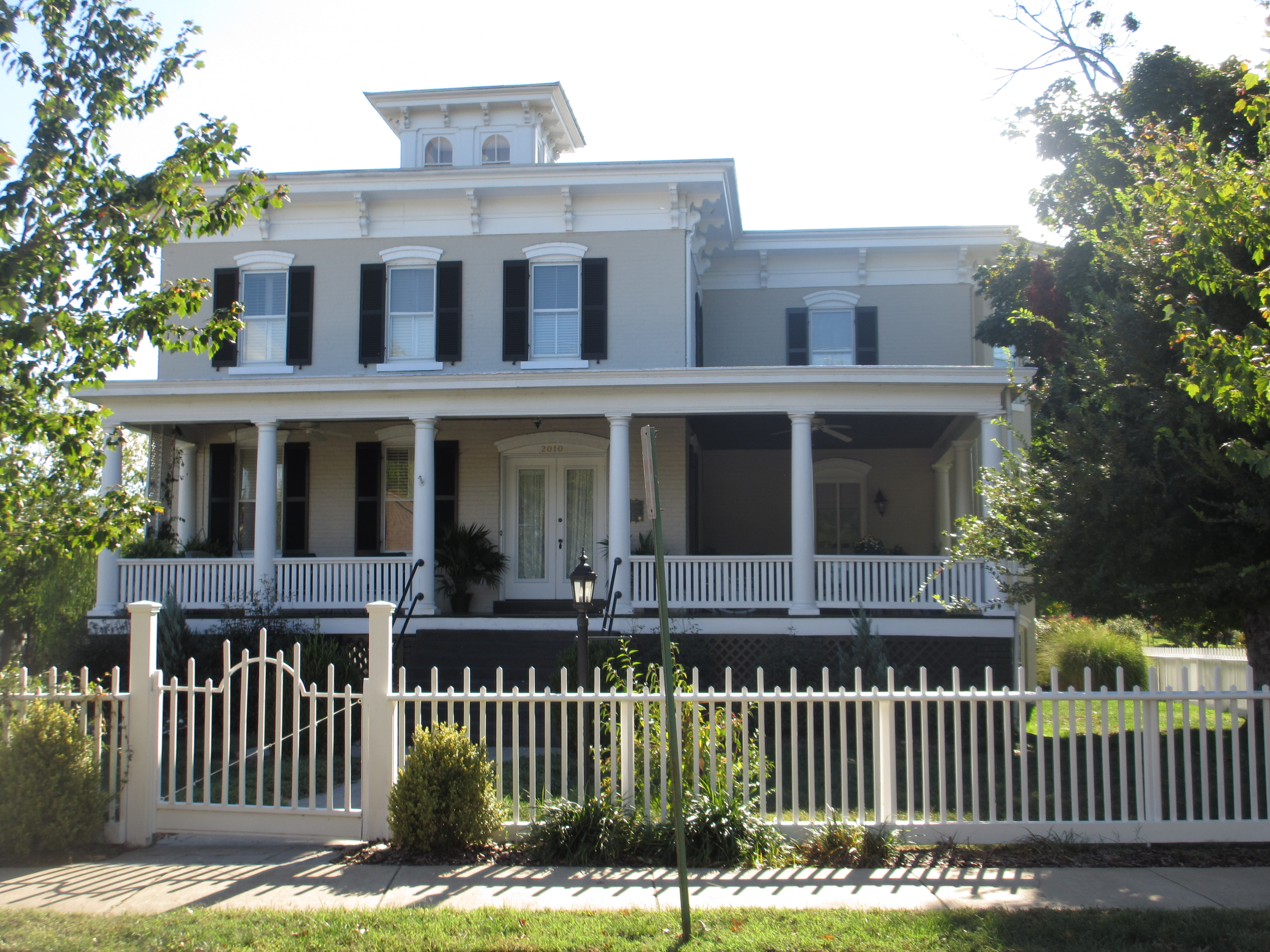
- Elmhurst, September 2012

- Location within Northern Virginia Location within Virginia Location within the United States
- Location: 2010 Fall Hill Ave., Fredericksburg, Virginia
- Coordinates: 38°18′40.6368″N 77°28′13.9224″W
- Area: less than one acre
- Built: 1871, c. 1900, 1912-1921
- Architectural style: Italianate
- NRHP reference No.: 08000242
- VLR No.: 111-5267

Significant dates
- Added to NRHP: March 27, 2008
- Designated VLR: December 5, 2007

Elmhurst is a historic home located at Fredericksburg, Virginia. It was built in 1871, and is a two-story, three-bay, double-pile, L-plan, brick dwelling in the Italianate style. It is topped by a hipped roof over a low-pitched, pyramidal and shed roof with a large belvedere and eaves supported by large, elaborate brackets. It has a 1 1/2-story kitchen wing added in 1900 and a 2 1/2-story addition and porch built between 1912 and 1921.

It was listed on the National Register of Historic Places in 2008.
