= Colonial families of Maryland =

The colonial families of Maryland were the leading families in the Province of Maryland. Several also had interests in the Colony of Virginia, and the two are sometimes referred to as the Chesapeake Colonies.

== Founders and scions ==
Family name	Related	Family members	Notes
Adams Charles County		Francis Adams	(c. 1645 – 1698) early settler
Adams Charles County		John Adams	(c. 1670 – 1740) early settler
Adams Charles County		Francis Adams II	(1680 – 1766) revolutionary, planter and gentleman
Adams Charles County		Charles Adams	(c. 1672 – 1733) carpenter
Bowie Prince George's County	See also: Bowie, Maryland is named after Colonel William Duckett Bowie's son Oden Bowie; Mattaponi (John Bowie Jr. House); and Fairview Plantation is the plantation home of the Bowie family	John Bowie, Sr.	(1688 – 1759) early settler
Bowie Prince George's County	See also: Bowie, Maryland is named after Colonel William Duckett Bowie's son Oden Bowie; Mattaponi (John Bowie Jr. House); and Fairview Plantation is the plantation home of the Bowie family	Oden Bowie	(1826 – 1894) 34th governor of the state of Maryland
Bowie Prince George's County	See also: Bowie, Maryland is named after Colonel William Duckett Bowie's son Oden Bowie; Mattaponi (John Bowie Jr. House); and Fairview Plantation is the plantation home of the Bowie family	Robert Bowie	(1750 – 1818) 11th governor of Maryland
Bowie Prince George's County	See also: Bowie, Maryland is named after Colonel William Duckett Bowie's son Oden Bowie; Mattaponi (John Bowie Jr. House); and Fairview Plantation is the plantation home of the Bowie family	Thomas Fielder Bowie	(1808 – 1869) politician
Bowie Prince George's County	See also: Bowie, Maryland is named after Colonel William Duckett Bowie's son Oden Bowie; Mattaponi (John Bowie Jr. House); and Fairview Plantation is the plantation home of the Bowie family	Walter Bowie	(1748 – 1810) slave owner, racehorse owner and politician
Bowie Prince George's County	See also: Bowie, Maryland is named after Colonel William Duckett Bowie's son Oden Bowie; Mattaponi (John Bowie Jr. House); and Fairview Plantation is the plantation home of the Bowie family	Captain William Bowie	(c 1721 – c 1791) revolutionary, member of the Assembly of Freemen, and Annapolis Convention delegate
Bowie Prince George's County	See also: Bowie, Maryland is named after Colonel William Duckett Bowie's son Oden Bowie; Mattaponi (John Bowie Jr. House); and Fairview Plantation is the plantation home of the Bowie family	William Duckett Bowie	(1803 – 1873) politician
Brent St. Mary's County, Queen Anne's County, Kent County	See also: Margaret Brent Middle School, named after Margaret Brent; Maryland Women's Hall of Fame; and Kent Fort Manor, home to the Brent Family	Margaret Brent	(c 1601 – c 1671) first woman in the English colonies to appear before court
Brent St. Mary's County, Queen Anne's County, Kent County	See also: Margaret Brent Middle School, named after Margaret Brent; Maryland Women's Hall of Fame; and Kent Fort Manor, home to the Brent Family	Mary Brent	early settler and plantation owner, sister of Margaret
Brent St. Mary's County, Queen Anne's County, Kent County	See also: Margaret Brent Middle School, named after Margaret Brent; Maryland Women's Hall of Fame; and Kent Fort Manor, home to the Brent Family	Giles Brent	(c1600 – 1672) Catholic early settler, married Mary Kittamaquad, the daughter of the Piscataway Tayac
Brice Anne Arundel County	See also: Brice House (Annapolis, Maryland)	Brice III	(1738–1820) lawyer and mayor of Annapolis
Brice Anne Arundel County	See also: Brice House (Annapolis, Maryland)	John Brice Jr.	(1705–1766) settler and Loyalist politician
Brice Anne Arundel County	See also: Brice House (Annapolis, Maryland)	James Brice	(1746–1801) governor of Maryland
Brooke Old Charles County, Calvert County, Prince George's County, Montgomery County	See also: Fair Hill, the former estate of Richard Brooke; Fair Hill Training Center; and Brookeville, Maryland	Robert Brooke, Sr.	(1602–1655) early settler, planter
Brooke Old Charles County, Calvert County, Prince George's County, Montgomery County	See also: Fair Hill, the former estate of Richard Brooke; Fair Hill Training Center; and Brookeville, Maryland	Thomas Brooke, Sr.	(1632 – 1676) lawyer, planter, High Sheriff and Chief Justice
Brooke Old Charles County, Calvert County, Prince George's County, Montgomery County	See also: Fair Hill, the former estate of Richard Brooke; Fair Hill Training Center; and Brookeville, Maryland	Thomas Brooke, Jr.	(1659 – 1730/31) politician, planter
Brooke Old Charles County, Calvert County, Prince George's County, Montgomery County	See also: Fair Hill, the former estate of Richard Brooke; Fair Hill Training Center; and Brookeville, Maryland	Thomas Brooke III	(1683 – 1744) politician, planter
Brooke Old Charles County, Calvert County, Prince George's County, Montgomery County	See also: Fair Hill, the former estate of Richard Brooke; Fair Hill Training Center; and Brookeville, Maryland	Richard Brooke	(1736 – 1788) politician, planter
Burgess Anne Arundel County, Frederick County		William Burgess	(c 1622 – 1686/87) planter, merchant, politician
Burgess Anne Arundel County, Frederick County		John Burgess	(1696 – 1774) planter
Burgess Anne Arundel County, Frederick County		Edward Burgess	(ca. 1733 – 1809) planter, captain, First Maryland Battalion of the Flying Camp
Calvert, Barons Baltimore St. Mary's County, Ann Arundel County	See also: Category:Calvert family residences	Cecilius Calvert, 2nd Baron Baltimore	(1605 – 31675) politician, peer and lawyer, first proprietor of Maryland
Calvert, Barons Baltimore St. Mary's County, Ann Arundel County	See also: Category:Calvert family residences	Leonard Calvert	(1606 – 1647) first proprietary governor of the Province of Maryland
Calvert, Barons Baltimore St. Mary's County, Ann Arundel County	See also: Category:Calvert family residences	Phillip Calvert (governor)	(c. 1626 - c. 1682), fifth governor of Maryland
Calvert, Barons Baltimore St. Mary's County, Ann Arundel County	See also: Category:Calvert family residences	Charles Calvert, 3rd Baron Baltimore	(1637 – 1715) English peer and colonial administrator
Calvert, Barons Baltimore St. Mary's County, Ann Arundel County	See also: Category:Calvert family residences	Benedict Calvert, 4th Baron Baltimore	(1679 – 1715) English peer and politician
Calvert, Barons Baltimore St. Mary's County, Ann Arundel County	See also: Category:Calvert family residences	Charles Calvert Lazenby	(c. 1688 – 1734) British Army officer, colonial administrator, planter and proprietary governor of Maryland
Calvert, Barons Baltimore St. Mary's County, Ann Arundel County	See also: Category:Calvert family residences	Charles Calvert, 5th Baron Baltimore	(1699 – 1751) British nobleman and proprietary governor of Maryland
Calvert, Barons Baltimore St. Mary's County, Ann Arundel County	See also: Category:Calvert family residences	Benedict Leonard Calvert	(1700 – 1732) 15th proprietary governor of Maryland
Calvert, Barons Baltimore St. Mary's County, Ann Arundel County	See also: Category:Calvert family residences	Benedict Swingate Calvert	(1722 – 1788) illegitimate son of Charles Calvert, 5th Baron Baltimore, planter, slave owner, politician and Loyalist
Calvert, Barons Baltimore St. Mary's County, Ann Arundel County	See also: Category:Calvert family residences	Henry Harford	(1758 – 1834), illegitimate son of Frederick Calvert, 6th Baron Baltimore, namesake of Harford County, last proprietary owner of the British colony of Maryland
Carroll St. Mary's County, Anne Arundel County, Frederick County, Cecil County	See also: Doughoregan Manor, Category:Carroll family residences, and St. Thomas Manor	Charles Carroll the Settler	
Carroll St. Mary's County, Anne Arundel County, Frederick County, Cecil County	See also: Doughoregan Manor, Category:Carroll family residences, and St. Thomas Manor	Charles Carroll of Annapolis	
Carroll St. Mary's County, Anne Arundel County, Frederick County, Cecil County	See also: Doughoregan Manor, Category:Carroll family residences, and St. Thomas Manor	Charles Carroll (barrister)	
Carroll St. Mary's County, Anne Arundel County, Frederick County, Cecil County	See also: Doughoregan Manor, Category:Carroll family residences, and St. Thomas Manor	Charles Carroll of Carrollton	Carrollton Manor, Mount Clare
Carroll St. Mary's County, Anne Arundel County, Frederick County, Cecil County	See also: Doughoregan Manor, Category:Carroll family residences, and St. Thomas Manor	Daniel Carroll	
Carroll St. Mary's County, Anne Arundel County, Frederick County, Cecil County	See also: Doughoregan Manor, Category:Carroll family residences, and St. Thomas Manor	John Carroll (bishop)	
Carroll St. Mary's County, Anne Arundel County, Frederick County, Cecil County	See also: Doughoregan Manor, Category:Carroll family residences, and St. Thomas Manor	Thomas King Carroll	
Carroll St. Mary's County, Anne Arundel County, Frederick County, Cecil County	See also: Doughoregan Manor, Category:Carroll family residences, and St. Thomas Manor	Anna Ella Carroll	
Carroll St. Mary's County, Anne Arundel County, Frederick County, Cecil County	See also: Doughoregan Manor, Category:Carroll family residences, and St. Thomas Manor	James Carroll (Maryland politician)	
Chase Somerset County, Baltimore County, Anne Arundel County	See also: Impeachment of Samuel Chase, SS Samuel Chase, and Chase–Lloyd House	Samuel Chase	(1741 – 1811) signer of the Continental Association and Declaration of Independence
Chase Somerset County, Baltimore County, Anne Arundel County	See also: Impeachment of Samuel Chase, SS Samuel Chase, and Chase–Lloyd House	Jeremiah Chase	(1748 – 1828) lawyer, jurist, and land speculator
Chew Anne Arundel County, Cecil County	See also: Tulip Hill; Maidstone (Owings, Maryland); and Warfield's Range	Samuel Chew (I-V)	early settlers of Herring Bay beginning in 1650, colonists and plantation owners
Chew Anne Arundel County, Cecil County	See also: Tulip Hill; Maidstone (Owings, Maryland); and Warfield's Range	John Chew Thomas	(1764 – 1836) politician, member of the House of Representatives for Maryland's 2nd district
Contee Prince George's County	See also: Oaklands (Laurel, Maryland)	Thomas Contee	(c. 1729–1811) militia man, politician and planter
Contee Prince George's County	See also: Oaklands (Laurel, Maryland)	Benjamin Contee	(1755 – 1815) priest and member of the House of Representatives
Key Cecil County, Montgomery County	See also: Terra Rubra, Key Family plantation and Woodley Mansion	Philip Barton Key	(1757 – 1815), loyalist and judge
Key Cecil County, Montgomery County	See also: Terra Rubra, Key Family plantation and Woodley Mansion	Philip Key	(1750 – 1820) congressional representative
Key Cecil County, Montgomery County	See also: Terra Rubra, Key Family plantation and Woodley Mansion	Barnes Compton	(1830 – 1898) politician and Treasurer of Maryland
Key Cecil County, Montgomery County	See also: Terra Rubra, Key Family plantation and Woodley Mansion	Francis Scott Key	(1779 – 1843) lawyer and author of author of the national anthem
Cresap Allegany County	See also: Cresaptown, Maryland; Cresaptown-Bel Air, Maryland; and Dans Mountain	Thomas Cresap	(c.1702—c.1790) settler and trader, served Lord Baltimore as an agent in Cresap's War
Cresap Allegany County	See also: Cresaptown, Maryland; Cresaptown-Bel Air, Maryland; and Dans Mountain	Michael Cresap	(1742 – 1775) frontiersman immortalized in Logan's Lament, owned the Michael Cresap House
Darnall Prince George's County, Calvert County	See also: Darnall's Chance, Portland Manor, and His Lordship's Kindness	Henry Darnall	(1645 – 1711) planter, military officer and politician, proprietary agent for Lord Baltimore
Darnall Prince George's County, Calvert County	See also: Darnall's Chance, Portland Manor, and His Lordship's Kindness	Henry Darnall II	(1682–1759) planter and landowner
Digges Prince George's County	See also: Warburton Manor	William Digges	(c. 1651— 1697) planter, soldier and politician
Dent St. Mary's County, Charles County	See also: Dentsville, Maryland; Fendall-Dent-Worthington family political line; and Whitehaven, the Dent Family plantation is now the Ulysses S. Grant National Historic Site	Thomas Dent Sr.	(1630–1676), justice, sheriff, and member of the Maryland General Assembly
Dent St. Mary's County, Charles County	See also: Dentsville, Maryland; Fendall-Dent-Worthington family political line; and Whitehaven, the Dent Family plantation is now the Ulysses S. Grant National Historic Site	George Dent	(1756 – 1813) planter, served in the House of Representatives
Dorsey Anne Arundel County, Calvert County	See also: Dorsey Hall; Howard Lodge; and Waverly (Marriottsville, Maryland)	Edward Dorsey	(c. 1615 – 1659) boat-wright and patriarch
Dorsey Anne Arundel County, Calvert County	See also: Dorsey Hall; Howard Lodge; and Waverly (Marriottsville, Maryland)	Hon. John Dorsey	(before 1646 – 1714) colonial settler
Dorsey Anne Arundel County, Calvert County	See also: Dorsey Hall; Howard Lodge; and Waverly (Marriottsville, Maryland)	Major Edward Dorsey	(before 1646 – 1705) colonial settler
Dulany Anne Arundel County, Baltimore County	See also: Frederick, Maryland, founded by Daniel Dulany in honor of Lord Baltimore's son	Daniel Dulany the Elder	(1685–1753) lawyer and land-developer
Dulany Anne Arundel County, Baltimore County	See also: Frederick, Maryland, founded by Daniel Dulany in honor of Lord Baltimore's son	Daniel Dulany the Younger	(1722 – 1797) loyalist politician, mayor of Annapolis and lawyer
Dulany Anne Arundel County, Baltimore County	See also: Frederick, Maryland, founded by Daniel Dulany in honor of Lord Baltimore's son	Walter Dulany	(died 1773) politician and mayor of Annapolis
Duvall Prince George's County, Anne Arundel County	See also: Middle Plantation, home of the Duvall family patented in 1664	Mareen Duvall	(1625–1694) French Huguenot and early settler
Duvall Prince George's County, Anne Arundel County	See also: Middle Plantation, home of the Duvall family patented in 1664	Gabriel Duvall	(1752 – 1844) politician and jurist
Eden baronets St. Mary's County, Anne Arundel County		Sir Robert Eden, 1st Baronet, of Maryland	(1741 – 1784) colonial administrator and last colonial governor of Maryland
Eden baronets St. Mary's County, Anne Arundel County		Caroline Calvert Eden	(c. 1737 – c.1773) namesake of Caroline County
Fendall Charles County, Prince George's County	See also: Fendall-Dent-Worthington family political line; Blenheim (Maryland); and Marshall Hall, Maryland	Josias Fendall	(c. 1628 – c. 1687) colonial administrator, planter and proprietary governor
Goldsborough Dorchester County, Talbot County	See also: Myrtle Grove, plantation country home of the Goldsboroughs and Goldsborough House	Robert Goldsborough	(1711 – 1788) lawyer, Burgess, statesman and delegate to the Continental Congress
Goldsborough Dorchester County, Talbot County	See also: Myrtle Grove, plantation country home of the Goldsboroughs and Goldsborough House	Nicholas Goldsborugh	(1732 – 1750) Justice of Talbot County, Burgess, Ferry manager
Goldsborough Dorchester County, Talbot County	See also: Myrtle Grove, plantation country home of the Goldsboroughs and Goldsborough House	John Goldsborough	(1742 – 1770) Managed a ferry, Freeman, General Assembly of state Talbot County
Goldsborough Dorchester County, Talbot County	See also: Myrtle Grove, plantation country home of the Goldsboroughs and Goldsborough House	Colonel Nicholas Goldsborough	(c 1787 – c 1858) plantation owner, politician
Goldsborough Dorchester County, Talbot County	See also: Myrtle Grove, plantation country home of the Goldsboroughs and Goldsborough House	Charles Goldsborough	(1765 – 1834) 16th governor and federalist politician
Goldsborough Dorchester County, Talbot County	See also: Myrtle Grove, plantation country home of the Goldsboroughs and Goldsborough House	William Goldsborough	(1750–1801) plantation owner, politician
Greenberry Anne Arundel County, Baltimore County	See also: Whitehall, property once owned by the Greenberrys; Greenbury Light, a historic site at Greenberry Point, owned by the family; and Newtowne Neck State Park, public park on the former landholdings of the Greenberry family	Nicholas Greenberry	(c.1627 – 1697) 4th royal governor and military commander
Greene St. Mary's County, Charles County	See also: Green's Inheritance	Governor Thomas Greene	(1610 – 1652) early settler and second provincial governor
Hammond Anne Arundel County, Howard County	See also: Howard's Adventure, country estate of the Hammond Family; Hammond–Harwood House, historic home built by Mathias Hammond; and Burleigh Manor, historic home built by Rezin Hammond	Major Philip Hammond	(1697–1760) planter, politician and landowner
Hammond Anne Arundel County, Howard County	See also: Howard's Adventure, country estate of the Hammond Family; Hammond–Harwood House, historic home built by Mathias Hammond; and Burleigh Manor, historic home built by Rezin Hammond	Mathias Hammond	(1740–1786) revolutionary
Hammond Anne Arundel County, Howard County	See also: Howard's Adventure, country estate of the Hammond Family; Hammond–Harwood House, historic home built by Mathias Hammond; and Burleigh Manor, historic home built by Rezin Hammond	Rezin Hammond	(1745–1809) revolutionary, patriot and planter
Hammond Anne Arundel County, Howard County	See also: Howard's Adventure, country estate of the Hammond Family; Hammond–Harwood House, historic home built by Mathias Hammond; and Burleigh Manor, historic home built by Rezin Hammond	John Hammond Maj.Gen.	Tombstone from 'Mountain Neck' plantation to St.Anne's, Church Circle, Annapolis
Hanson Charles County, Prince George's County	See also: Statue of John Hanson, John Hanson Highway, and Belmont Estate	John Hanson	(1721 – 1783) merchant, politician and delegate to the Continental Congress
Hanson Charles County, Prince George's County	See also: Statue of John Hanson, John Hanson Highway, and Belmont Estate	Alexander Contee Hanson	(1786 – 1819) lawyer, publisher, and statesman
Hanson Charles County, Prince George's County	See also: Statue of John Hanson, John Hanson Highway, and Belmont Estate	Alexander Contee Hanson Sr.	(1749 – 1806) attorney and Chancellor of Maryland
Hatton St. Marys County		Thomas Hatton Sr.	(d 1655) early settler, secretary, provincial justice
Hatton St. Marys County		Thomas Hatton	(1642 – 1675) early settler
Howard Baltimore County, Howard County		Matthew Howard Sr	early settler
Howard Baltimore County, Howard County		John Eager Howard	(1752 – 1827) soldier, plantation owner and politician, Howard County is named after him
Howard Baltimore County, Howard County		George Howard (Governor of Maryland)	(1789 – 1846) 22nd governor of Maryland
Howard Baltimore County, Howard County		Benjamin Chew Howard	(1791 – 1872) politician and lawyer
Howard Baltimore County, Howard County		William Howard	(1793–1834) engineer who worked for the Baltimore and Ohio Railroad
Jenifer Charles County, Anne Arundel County	See also: Ellerslie, Maryland; Retreat (Port Tobacco, Maryland); and Sunnyside (Aquasco, Maryland)	Daniel of St. Thomas Jenifer	(1723 – 1790) politician and Constitution signer
Jenifer Charles County, Anne Arundel County	See also: Ellerslie, Maryland; Retreat (Port Tobacco, Maryland); and Sunnyside (Aquasco, Maryland)	Daniel Jenifer	(1791 – 1855) lawyer and statesman
Lee Prince George's County, Frederick County	See also: Blenheim, the Lee Family of Maryland descends from the "Blenheim" line of the Lee Family of Virginia; Melwood Park, an estate that came into possession of the Lee family by marriage; and SS Thomas Sim Lee	Philip Lee	(1681–1744), planter, naval officer and member of the Maryland General Assembly
Lee Prince George's County, Frederick County	See also: Blenheim, the Lee Family of Maryland descends from the "Blenheim" line of the Lee Family of Virginia; Melwood Park, an estate that came into possession of the Lee family by marriage; and SS Thomas Sim Lee	Thomas Sim Lee	(1745 – 1819) American planter, patriot, and politician who served as Maryland governor
Lloyd		Edward Lloyd (Colonial Governor of Maryland)	
Lloyd		Edward Lloyd (delegate)	
Lloyd		Edward Lloyd (Governor of Maryland)	
Lloyd		Henry Lloyd (governor)	
Lloyd		James Lloyd (Maryland)	(1756 – 1830) politician
Ogle Prince George's County, Anne Arundel County	See also: Belair, home to the Ogle family and Ogle Hall	Samuel Ogle	(c. 1694 – 1752) 16th, 18th and 20th proprietary governor of Maryland
Ogle Prince George's County, Anne Arundel County	See also: Belair, home to the Ogle family and Ogle Hall	Benjamin Ogle	(1749 – 1809) ninth governor of Maryland
Paca Queen Anne's County, Anne Arundel County	See also: Wye River (plantation) and Paca House and Garden	William Paca	(1740 – 1799) signatory to Continental Association and Declaration of Independence
Peale		Charles Willson Peale	
Peale		James Peale	
Peale		Raphaelle Peale	
Peale		Rembrandt Peale	
Peale		Rubens Peale	
Peale		Titian Peale	
Peale		Anna Claypoole Peale	
Peale		Charles Peale Polk	
Peale		Margaretta Angelica Peale	
Peale		Sarah Miriam Peale	
Ridgely Howard County, Baltimore County	See also: Hickory Ridge, home of the Ridgely's; Ridgely, Maryland; and Ridgely's Delight, Baltimore	Henry Ridgely	(1640–1710)
Ridgely Howard County, Baltimore County	See also: Hickory Ridge, home of the Ridgely's; Ridgely, Maryland; and Ridgely's Delight, Baltimore	Henry Ridgely III	(1690–1749)
Ridgely Howard County, Baltimore County	See also: Hickory Ridge, home of the Ridgely's; Ridgely, Maryland; and Ridgely's Delight, Baltimore	Charles Ridgely II	(1702–1772) planter, politician, justice, merchant
Ridgely Howard County, Baltimore County	See also: Hickory Ridge, home of the Ridgely's; Ridgely, Maryland; and Ridgely's Delight, Baltimore	Charles Ridgely III	(1733–1790) planter, iron monger, builder of Hampton Mansion
Ridgely Howard County, Baltimore County	See also: Hickory Ridge, home of the Ridgely's; Ridgely, Maryland; and Ridgely's Delight, Baltimore	Charles Carnan Ridgely	(1760 – 1829) politician, 15th governor of Maryland
Riggin Somerset County	See also: Nelson Homestead, also known as the Elisha Riggin House	Teague Riggin	Founder; Planter, Golden Lyon Plantation, Pocomoke Sound
Riggin Somerset County	See also: Nelson Homestead, also known as the Elisha Riggin House	Darby Riggin	Founder; Planter, Annemessex, later moved to Accomack County, Virginia
Riggin Somerset County	See also: Nelson Homestead, also known as the Elisha Riggin House	John Riggin	Planter, Marumsco, Pocomoke Sound
Riggin Somerset County	See also: Nelson Homestead, also known as the Elisha Riggin House	John Riggin	Planter, Annemessex
Riggin Somerset County	See also: Nelson Homestead, also known as the Elisha Riggin House	Isaac Riggin	Corporal, Maryland Militia, War of 1812.
Riggin Somerset County	See also: Nelson Homestead, also known as the Elisha Riggin House	Elisha Riggin	shipbuilder
Riggin Somerset County	See also: Nelson Homestead, also known as the Elisha Riggin House	John Riggin	Deputy clerk of the court, Worcester County; father of Brig. Gen. John Riggin, Jr.
Rodgers Cecil County, Harford County	See also: Rodgers Tavern and Sion Hill	Colonel John Rodgers Sr.	(b 1726) early settler, naval officer
Rodgers Cecil County, Harford County	See also: Rodgers Tavern and Sion Hill	Commodore John Rodgers	(1772 – 1838) naval officer
Rodgers Cecil County, Harford County	See also: Rodgers Tavern and Sion Hill	Admiral John Rodgers III	(1812 – 1882) naval officer
Rodgers Cecil County, Harford County	See also: Rodgers Tavern and Sion Hill	George Washington Rodgers	(1787–1832) naval officer
Saffell Frederick County Montgomery County		Samuel Saffell	(1712–1777) early settler, landowner, second probated will in Montgomery County
Saffell Frederick County Montgomery County		Joshua Saffell	revolutionary soldier
Sewall St. Mary's County, Dorchester County, Queen Anne's County	See also: Mattapany-Sewall Archeological Site	Henry Sewall	(d 1665) early settler, founder of Mattapany, My Lady Sewall's Manor
Sewall St. Mary's County, Dorchester County, Queen Anne's County	See also: Mattapany-Sewall Archeological Site	Nicholas Lewis Sewall	planter, slave owner
Sewall St. Mary's County, Dorchester County, Queen Anne's County	See also: Mattapany-Sewall Archeological Site	Charles S. Sewall	(1779 – 1848) politician, served in the Maryland State Senate, House of Delegates and House of Representatives
Smallwood Anne Arundel County, Charles County	See also: Smallwood State Park and Fort Smallwood Park	Governor William Smallwood	planter, soldier and politician, fourth governor of Maryland
Sparrow Anne Arundel County	See also: Sparrows Point, Maryland	Thomas Sparrow	(1746–1784) Goldsmith, engraver jeweler, created the dies for the 1788 Chalmers shilling, the first coin minted in the Republic
Steuart Anne Arundel County, Baltimore County	See also: Maryland Square and Dodon (farm)	George H. Steuart (planter)	Planter
Steuart Anne Arundel County, Baltimore County	See also: Maryland Square and Dodon (farm)	George H. Steuart (politician)	(1700–1784) physician, tobacco planter, and Loyalist politician
Steuart Anne Arundel County, Baltimore County	See also: Maryland Square and Dodon (farm)	George Steuart Hume	
Steuart Anne Arundel County, Baltimore County	See also: Maryland Square and Dodon (farm)	George H. Steuart (Major General)	
Steuart Anne Arundel County, Baltimore County	See also: Maryland Square and Dodon (farm)	Richard Sprigg Steuart	(1797–1876) physician and pioneer of the treatment of mental illness
Steuart Anne Arundel County, Baltimore County	See also: Maryland Square and Dodon (farm)	George H. Steuart (Brigadier General)	(1828 – 1903) planter and Confederate military officer
Steuart Anne Arundel County, Baltimore County	See also: Maryland Square and Dodon (farm)	William Steuart (Mayor of Baltimore)	(1780 – 1839) stonemason and mayor of Baltimore
Stone Charles County, Anne Arundel County	See also: Thomas Stone National Historic Site, Peggy Stewart House, and Category:Stone family residences	William Stone	(c. 1603 – c. 1660) English-born merchant, planter and proprietary governor of Maryland
Stone Charles County, Anne Arundel County	See also: Thomas Stone National Historic Site, Peggy Stewart House, and Category:Stone family residences	Thomas Stone	(1743 – 1787) planter, politician, and lawyer who signed the Declaration of Independence, namesake of the SS Thomas Stone
Stone Charles County, Anne Arundel County	See also: Thomas Stone National Historic Site, Peggy Stewart House, and Category:Stone family residences	Michael J. Stone	(1747 – 1812) American planter and statesman
Stone Charles County, Anne Arundel County	See also: Thomas Stone National Historic Site, Peggy Stewart House, and Category:Stone family residences	John Hoskins Stone	(1749 – 1804) planter, soldier, and 7th governor of Maryland
Stone Charles County, Anne Arundel County	See also: Thomas Stone National Historic Site, Peggy Stewart House, and Category:Stone family residences	William Murray Stone	(1779 – 1838) clergyman
Stone Charles County, Anne Arundel County	See also: Thomas Stone National Historic Site, Peggy Stewart House, and Category:Stone family residences	Frederick Stone	(1820 – 1899) lawyer and Congressman from Maryland's fifth district
Tasker Prince George's County	See also: Belair Mansion, ancestral home of the Tasker family and Selima, Tasker Jr.'s prized mare that became a foundational dam for thoroughbreds in the United Staes	Benjamin Tasker, Sr.	(c. 1690–1768) 21st proprietary governor of Maryland
Tasker Prince George's County	See also: Belair Mansion, ancestral home of the Tasker family and Selima, Tasker Jr.'s prized mare that became a foundational dam for thoroughbreds in the United Staes	Benjamin Tasker, Jr.	(1720–1760) politician, slave trader and Mayor of Annapolis
Tilghman Talbot County	See also: Sherwood Manor (St. Michaels, Maryland) and Hope House (Easton, Maryland)	James Tilghman	(1716–1793) lawyer and public servant
Tilghman Talbot County	See also: Sherwood Manor (St. Michaels, Maryland) and Hope House (Easton, Maryland)	Tench Tilghman	(1744 – 1786) Continental Army officer and aide-de-camp to George Washington
Vallette Anne Arundel County		Elie Vallette	(1744 – 1786) early settler, loyalist and clerk
Vallette Anne Arundel County		Elie Augustus Frederick La Vallette	(1790 – 1862) naval officer
Warfield Howard County Anne Arundel County	See also: Paternal Gift Farm, Maryland; Warfield's Range; and Oakdale Manor	Richard Warfield Capt.	(b.1646) early settler
Warfield Howard County Anne Arundel County	See also: Paternal Gift Farm, Maryland; Warfield's Range; and Oakdale Manor	Charles Alexander Warfield	(1751–1813) planter, militia member, revolutionary
Warfield Howard County Anne Arundel County	See also: Paternal Gift Farm, Maryland; Warfield's Range; and Oakdale Manor	Henry Ridgely Warfield	(1774 – 1839) politician, U.S. Representative
Worthington Prince George's County, Baltimore County	See also: Worthington's Quarters	John Worthington Capt.	Founder; tombstone transferred to St. Anne's, Church Circle, Annapolis
Worthington Prince George's County, Baltimore County	See also: Worthington's Quarters	Walter Brooke Cox Worthington	(1795 – 1845) member of Maryland House of Delegates
Worthington Prince George's County, Baltimore County	See also: Worthington's Quarters	Thomas Contee Worthington	(1782–1847) U.S. Representative from Maryland
Worthington Prince George's County, Baltimore County	See also: Worthington's Quarters	William Grafton Dulany Worthington	(1785–1856) lawyer, statesman, member of Maryland House of Delegates

== See also ==
- First Families of Virginia
- American gentry
- Hammond-Harwood House
- Whitehall (Annapolis, Maryland)
- Tulip Hill
- Pimlico Race Course
- Preakness Stakes
- History of White Americans in Baltimore
- Old Stock Americans
