= Fendall family =

American political family

The Fendall family was a prominent American political family that had its beginnings when Englishman Josias Fendall (c. 1628 – 1687) immigrated to the Province of Maryland in the early 1650s. He was appointed as the fourth proprietary governor of Maryland from 1656 to 1660.

== Lineage ==
- Gov. Josias Fendall, Lt. Gen., Esq. (c. 1628 – 1687), fourth proprietary and colonial Governor of Maryland. He was born in England, and came to the Province of Maryland. He was the progenitor of the Fendall Family in America.
  - Col. John Fendall I, Esq. (1672–1734), planter, justice of and member of the Lower House.
    - William Marshall III (stepson) (1690–1734) of "Charley".
      - Maj. John Marshall (1726–1800), major during Revolution.
        - Mary Marshall (c. 1742 – 1800), who married Richard Clagett, Jr. (1736–1789).
          - Capt. Horatio Clagett (1777–1844), captain during War of 1812.
    - Thomas Marshall I "Senior" (stepson) (1694–1759), original builder of "Marshall Hall".
      - Capt. John Stoddert (stepson) (c. 1710 – 1767), justice, member of the Lower House, Captain of county militia.
        - Maj. William Truman Stoddert, Sr. (1736), veteran of the American Revolution.
          - Maj. John Truman Stoddert, Sr., Esq. (1790–1870), lawyer, member U.S. House of Representatives, veteran of War of 1812.
      - Lt. Thomas Stoddert (stepson) (1712–1755), veteran of the French and Indian War.
        - Capt. Benjamin Stoddert, Sr. (1751–1813), veteran of the Revolution, 1st secretary of the U.S. Navy.
          - Elizabeth Stoddert (1785–1859), who married Dr. Thomas Beale Ewell (1785–1826) a naval surgeon during the Tripolitan War.
            - Adj. Gen. Benjamin Stoddert Ewell (1810–1894) a Confederate general during Civil War.
            - Lt. Gen. Richard Stoddert Ewell (1817–1872) a Confederate general during Civil War.
            - Lt. Thomas Ewell (c. 1819 – 1847) a United States Army officer in the Mexican–American War, who was killed in action at the Battle of Cerra Gordo.
          - Harriot Stoddert (1789–1849), who married Sen. George Washington Campbell, Sr. (1769–1848) member of the U.S. House of Representatives, Senator, member of the Tennessee Supreme Court, and U.S. Secretary of the Treasury under James Madison.
      - Capt. Thomas Hanson Marshall I (1731–1801) justice, captain during Revolution, and owner of "Marshall Hall".
        - Dr. Thomas Marshall II (1757–1829) surgeon during the American Revolution, and owner of "Marshall Hall".
        - Anne Marshall (1759–1789) first wife of Dr. Benjamin Fendall (1753–1818) (same as below).
        - Mary Marshall (1767–1789) who married Gen. Philip Stuart (1752–1830) a lieutenant of the 3rd Continental Dragoons during the Revolution, general during the War of 1812, and member of the U.S. House of Representatives.
      - Sarah Marshall (1735–1795), who married Brig. Gen. John Herbert Dent (1733–1809) a justice, member of the General Assembly, brigadier general during Revolution.
        - Anne Herbert Dent (1756–1813), who married Capt. William Mackall Wilkinson II, Esq. (1752–1799) member of the Lower House, and captain during Revolution.
          - Jane Herbert Dent Wilkinson (1798–1880) "Mother of Texas", who married Gen. James Long, Dr. (1793–1822) a surgeon at the Battle of New Orleans during the War of 1812, and early settler in Texas.
          - Barbara Mackall Wilkinson (1784–1858), who married Capt. Alexander Hamilton Calvit (1784–1836) a captain in the Mississippi Militia, and early settler of Texas.
        - Capt. Thomas Marshall Dent (1761–1823), a veteran of the Revolution, who became a captain by 1794.
          - Dr. John Marshall Dent, Sr. (1792–1839), a surgeon during the War of 1812.
            - Dr. John Marshall Dent, Jr. (1834–1922), an assistant surgeon during the Civil War.
          - Mary Anne Dent (1793–1855), who married James Longstreet I (1784–1833).
            - William Longstreet, Sr. (1817–1889) a veteran of the Mexican–American War.
            - Gen. James Longstreet II (1821–1904), a Confederate general during the Civil War.
        - Capt. George Dent, Gent., Hon. (c. 1758 – 1813), a captain during the Revolutionary War, President of the State Senate, and member of the U.S. House of Representatives.
          - Capt. John Herbert Dent (1782–1823), a captain during the First Barbary War and the War of 1812.
            - Capt. Jonah Horry Dent (1815–1892), a captain in the Confederate States Army.
            - Katherine Anne Herbert Dent (1821–1882), who married Sen. Robert Barnwell (Smith) Rhett, Sr. (1800–1876), who advocated secession, and was a senator of South Carolina.
              - Col. Alfred Moore Rhett (1829–1889), a Confederate colonel during the Civil War.
              - Maj. Andrew Burnett Rhett, Sr. (1831–1879), a Confederate major during the Civil War.
              - Sarah Sally de Saussure Taylor Rhett (1844–1921), who married Col. Alfred Roman (1824–1892), a Confederate Colonel during the Civil War.
            - Capt. George Columbus Dent (1822–1884), a Confederate captain during the Civil War.
          - Sara Marshall Dent (1783), who married 2) Dr. Thomas Hanson Marshall Fendall I (1782–1823) "of Augusta" (same as below).
          - Maria Dent (1788–1876), who married Capt. John Hall Neilson, Sr. (1771–1848) a sea captain, who removed to Tuscaloosa, Alabama.
          - Gen. James Trueman Dent (1790–1869), veteran of the War of 1812.
          - Gen. Dennis Dent (1796–1863), a veteran of the War of 1812, Florida Indian War, and member of the Alabama State Senate.
    - Elizabeth Fendall (1700–1785), who married John Beall, Jr. (1701–1756).
      - Lt. Josias Beall (1725–1803), Speaker of the House of Delegates of the Assembly, and Lieutenant during the Revolutionary War. Josias married Millicent Beall Bradley (1723–1772) (same as below)
        - Robert Augustus Beall I (1767–1832), who immigrated to Georgia.
          - Gen. Robert Augustus Beall II (1800–1836), lawyer, state legislator, and general in the Georgia Militia who fought in the Florida Indian Wars. First Mayor of Macon, Georgia.
          - Ann Fendall Beall (1810–1876), who married Edward Brown Young (1802–1879), builder of "Fendall Hall", Eufaula, Alabama.
            - Henry Augusta Young, Sr. (1835–1863), Confederate soldier.
            - Anna Beall Young (1840–1902), who married Capt. Stouten Hubert Dent (1835–1917), Captain and commanded what became known as "Dent's Alabama Battery" during Civil War.
              - Hon. Stanley Hubert Dent (1869–1938), member of Congress from 1909 to 1921, and appointed to the Alabama Supreme Court.
              - Capt. Henry Augustus Dent (1872–1971), captain and pay director of the U.S. Navy.
            - Mary Elizabeth Christina Young (1842–1891), who married Dr. Hamilton Moore Weedon, Sr. (1835), in charge of the Confederate Hospital in Eufaula during Civil War.
            - Helen Augusta "Ollie" Young (1847–1932), who married George Hatch Dent, Sr. (1843–1918), a sergeant in the 1st Maryland Regiment under Stonewall Jackson.
    - Ann Fendall (c. 1706 – 1772), who married Robert Bradley II (c. 1707 – 1772), Justice of Prince George's Co., Maryland.
      - Millicent Beall Bradley (1723–1772), who married Lt. Josias Beall (1725–1803) (same as above).
      - Eleanor Bradley (born c. 1739), who married Col. Robert Tyler V, Esq. (1727–1777), Justice and colonel of the Militia during Revolution.
        - Capt. Robert Bradley Tyler VI (1759–1793), captain during the Revolution.
    - Benjamin Fendall I, Esq. (1708–1764) of "Potomack", high sheriff and clerk of Charles Co., Maryland. Benjamin married Eleanor Lee (1710–1759), of the "Blenheim Lees".
      - John Fendall (1730–1763) of "Cedar Point".
        - Dr. Benjamin Fendall (1753–1818), first native born American Dentist, only dentist to be paid for his services during the American Revolution.
          - Dr. Thomas Hanson Marshall Fendall I (1782–1823) "of Augusta", a surgeon's mate during the Tripolitan War.
          - Col. John W. Fendall, Dr. (1784–1842), midshipmen during the Tripolitan War and Lieutenant during the War of 1812.
          - Dr. Edward Fendall (1786–1834) of "Woodlawn", who served in the War of 1812, was a magistrate in Baltimore, and a prominent early surgeon dentist of that town.
            - Charles Edward Fendall (1821–1894) who immigrated to Oregon in 1843, and was one of the early pioneers in Yamhill County.
              - Elbridge Gerry Fendall (1860–1926) early pioneer of West Chehalem, Oregon.
          - 2nd Lt. Philip Richard Fendall (1789–1821), second lieutenant during War of 1812.
      - Sarah Fendall (1732–1793), who married Col. Thomas Contee (1729–1811), of "Brookefield". Thomas was a member of the House of Burgesses, and a prominent American Patriot.
        - Rev. Benjamin Contee, Capt., Hon. (1755–1815), An American Episcopal priest and statesman from Maryland.
          - Alice Lee Contee (1803–1868), who married Gov. Joseph Kent, Sr., Col., Dr. (1779–1837).
        - Eleanor Lee Contee (1758–1786), who married Dr. Michael Wallace, Jr., Esq. (1749–1794).
          - Eleanor Lee Contee Wallace (1782–1826), who married Gov. Joseph Kent, Sr., Col., Dr. (1779–1837).
        - Jane Contee (1761–1825), who married William Worthington (1747–1820) of "The Valley", near Nottingham, P.G.'s Co., Maryland.
          - Gen. Thomas Contee Worthington (1782–1847), officer of the Maryland State Militia, and member of the Maryland State House of Representatives.
          - Gov. William Grafton Delaney Worthington IV, Hon. (1785–1856), lawyer, Judge, Governor and Secretary of the Territory of East Florida.
          - Walter Brooke Cox Worthington (1795–1845), member of the Maryland House of Representatives.
      - Philip Richard Fendall I (1734–1805), an office holder, lawyer, merchant, and builder of the Lee-Fendall House in Alexandria, Virginia.
        - Matilda Lee (stepdaughter) (1766–1790) of Stratford Hall, who married Maj. Gen. Henry "Light Horse Harry" Lee II (1756–1818).
        - Flora Lee (stepdaughter)(1771–1795), who married Col. Ludwell Lee, Esq. (1760–1836), son of Richard Henry Lee (1732–1794).
        - Philip Richard Fendall II (1794–1867), District Attorney of Washington, D.C.
          - Maj. Philip Richard Fendall III (1832–1879), a captain in the U.S. Marine Corps during the Civil War.
            - Marion Fendall (1870), who married Jacob Wendell III (c. 1869 – 1911).
              - Anne Catherine Tredick "Catherine" Wendell (died 1977), who married Lt. Col. Henry George Alfred Marius Victor Francis Herbert, 6th Earl of Carnarvon (1898–1987), son of George Edward Stanhope Molyneux Herbert, 5th Earl of Carnarvon (1866–1923). Anne married secondly, Lt. Geoffrey Seymour Grenfell (1898–1940).
                - Col. Henry George Reginald Molyneux Herbert, 7th Earl of Carnarvon, Hon. (1924–2001).
                  - George Reginald Oliver Molyneaux Herbert, 8th Earl of Carnarvon (1956).
              - Philippa Fendall Wendell (died 1974), who married Sir Randolph Algernon Ronald Stewart, 12th Earl of Galloway (1892–1978), son of Randolph Henry Stewart, 11th Earl of Galloway (1836–1920).
                - Antonia Marian Amy Isabel Stewart, Lady (1925–1971), who married Sir Charles Mark Dalrymple Fergusson, 3rd Baron Dalrymple (1915–1979).
                - Randolph Keith Reginald Stewart, 13th Earl of Galloway (1928).
          - Clarence "Claude" Fendall (1836–1868), a member of the U.S. Geodetic Survey during the Civil War.
          - Lt. James Robert Young Fendall (1838–1869), a lieutenant in the Confederate States Marine Corps during the Civil War.
      - Benjamin Fendall II (1739–1786) of "Pomonkey".
    - Mary Hanson Fendall (c. 1710 – 1758), who married Maj. Samuel Hanson, Sr. (1705–1749) a Justice and major in the Charles County Militia.
      - Maj. Samuel Hanson, Jr. (1738–1817), member of the Lower House, major during Revolution.

== See also ==
- Colonial families of Maryland
