= Fendall-Dent-Worthington family political line =

Political family

The Fendall-Dent-Worthington family is a family of politicians from the United States. Below is a list of members:

- Josias Fendall (1628–1627), Governor of Maryland Colony 1656–1660. Father of John Fendall.
  - John Fendall (1672–1734), Justice in Maryland Colony, legislator in Maryland Colony. Son of Josias Fendall.
    - Benjamin Fendall (1708–1764), Sheriff of Charles County, Maryland; Clerk of Charles County, Maryland. Son of John Fendall.
    - John Herbert Dent (1733–1809), Justice in Maryland, Maryland Assemblyman. Stepson-in-law of John Fendall.
    - Robert Bradley (1707–1772), Justice of Prince George's County, Maryland. Son-in-law of John Fendall.
    - Samuel Hanson (1705–1749), Justice in Charles County, Maryland. Son-in-law of John Fendall.
      - Josias Beall (1725–1803), Maryland Assemblyman. Grandson of John Fendall.
      - John Stoddert (1710–1767), Justice in Maryland, legislator in Maryland. Step-grandson of John Fendall.
      - Robert Tyler (1727–1777), Justice in Maryland. Grandson-in-law of John Fendall.
      - Thomas Contee (1729–1811), member of the Maryland House of Burgesses. Son-in-law of Benjamin Fendall.
      - Thomas Hanson Marshall (1731–1801), Justice in Maryland. Step-grandson of John Fendall.
      - John Herbert Dent (1733–1809), Justice in Maryland, Maryland Assemblyman. Step-grandson-in-law of John Fendall.
      - Samuel Hanson, Jr. (1738–1817), Maryland state legislator. Son of Samuel Hanson.
        - Philip Richard Fendall II (1794–1867), U.S. Attorney of District of Columbia 1841–1845. Great-grandson of John Fendall.
        - Benjamin Stoddert (1751–1813), Maryland Executive Councilman 1781–1782, County Judge in Maryland 1784–1785 1791, Maryland State Senator 1791–1794, U.S. Secretary of the Navy 1798–1801. Step-great-grandson of John Fendall.
        - George Dent (1756–1813), Maryland House Delegate 1782–1790, Maryland State Senator 1791–1792, Maryland State Court Judge 1791–1795, U.S. Representative from Maryland 1793–1801. Son of John Herbert Dent.
        - William Mackall Wilkinson II (1752–1799), Maryland legislator. Son-in-law of John Herbert Dent.
        - Benjamin Contee (1755–1815), Delegate to the Continental Congress from Maryland 1788, U.S. Representative from Maryland 1789–1791, Maryland State Court Judge 1815. Son of Thomas Contee.
        - Henry Lee III (1756–1818), Delegate to the Continental Congress from Virginia 1786–1788, Governor of Virginia 1791–1794, U.S. Representative from Virginia 1799–1801. Grandson-in-law of John Fendall.
        - Philip Stuart (1760–1830), Maryland House Delegate 1800–1806, U.S. Representative from Maryland 1811–1819. Son-in-law of Thomas Hanson Marshall.
          - Edward Fendall (1786–1834), Magistrate of Baltimore, Maryland. Great-grandson of Benjamin Fendall.
          - Dennis Dent (1796–1863), Alabama State Senator. Son of George Dent.
          - Robert Augustus Beall II (1800–1836), Georgia state legislator. Grandson of Josias Beall.
          - George Washington Campbell (1769–1848), U.S. Representative from Tennessee 1803–1809, Tennessee State Court Judge 1809, U.S. Senator from Tennessee 1811–1814 1815–1818, U.S. Secretary of the Treasury 1814, U.S. Minister to Russia 1818–1820. Son-in-law of Benjamin Stoddert.
          - Joseph Kent (1779–1837), U.S. Representative from Maryland 1811–1815 1819–1826, Maryland State Senator 1815, Governor of Maryland 1826–1829, U.S. Senator from Maryland 1833–1837. Son-in-law of Benjamin Contee.
          - Thomas Contee Worthington (1782–1847), Maryland House Delegate 1818, U.S. Representative from Maryland 1825–1827, Maryland Executive Councilman 1831–1833. Grandnephew of Benjamin Contee.
          - William Grafton Delaney Worthington (1785–1856), Georgia State Senator, Comptroller of the U.S. Treasury, Governor of the East Florida Territory, Secretary of the East Florida Territory. Grandnephew of Benjamin Contee.
          - Walter Brooke Cox Worthington (1795–1845), Maryland State Representative. Grandnephew of Benjamin Contee.
            - Robert Rhett (1800–1876), U.S. Representative from South Carolina 1837–1849, U.S. Senator from South Carolina 1850–1852, Delegate to the Confederate States Provisional Congress from South Carolina 1861–1862. Grandson-in-law of George Dent.
              - S. Hubert Dent, Jr. (1869–1938), Prosecuting Attorney of Montgomery County, Alabama 1902–1909; U.S. Representative from Alabama 1909–1921. Great-great-grandson of Josias Beall.

NOTE: Henry Lee was also brother of U.S. Secretary of State Charles Lee and U.S. Representative Richard Bland Lee, grandfather of Virginia Governor Fitzhugh Lee and U.S. Representative William H.F. Lee, grandnephew of Continental Congressional Delegate Richard Bland, first cousin once removed of U.S. Senator Richard Henry Lee, and third cousin of U.S. President Zachary Taylor and Missouri Governor Elliot Woolfolk Major.

== See also ==
- List of United States political families
