= Fendall =

Fendall is a surname. Notable people with the surname include:

- Fendall family, American political family descended from Josias Fendall, who immigrated to Maryland in the early 1650s
- Fendall-Dent-Worthington family political line
- John Fendall (disambiguation), several people by that name
- Josias Fendall, Esq. (1628–1687), the 4th Proprietary Governor of Maryland
- Philip Richard Fendall I (1734–1805), American banker, lawyer and merchant
- Philip Richard Fendall II (1794–1868), American lawyer and politician

== See also ==
- Lee-Fendall House, historic house located at 614 Oronoco St. in Alexandria, Virginia
