= Alexander C. Hanson =

American politician (1786-1819)

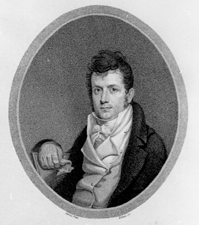

United States Senator from Maryland
- In office December 20, 1816 – April 23, 1819
- Preceded by: Robert G. Harper
- Succeeded by: William Pinkney

Member of the U.S. House of Representatives from Maryland's 3rd district
- In office March 4, 1813 – 1816
- Preceded by: Philip B. Key
- Succeeded by: George Peter

Member of the Maryland House of Delegates
- In office 1811–1815

Personal details
- Born: Alexander Contee Hanson; February 27, 1786 Annapolis, Maryland
- Died: April 23, 1819 (aged 33) Elkridge, Maryland, U.S.
- Party: Federalist
- Spouse: Priscilla Dorsey
- Children: Charles Grosvenor Hanson
- Parent(s): Alexander Contee Hanson, Sr. Rebecca Howard
- Relatives: Thomas P. Grosvenor (brother-in-law)
- Education: St. John's College

Alexander Contee Hanson (February 27, 1786 – April 23, 1819) was an American lawyer, publisher, and statesman. He represented the third district of Maryland in the U.S. House, and the state of Maryland in the U.S. Senate. The town of Hanson, Massachusetts is named after him.

== Early life ==
Alexander Contee Hanson was born in Annapolis, Maryland, on February 27, 1786, the second son of Alexander Contee Hanson, Sr. (1749–1806) and Rebecca Howard (ca. 1760–1806). His older brother, Charles W. Hanson, later became a judge in Baltimore. His younger sister, Mary Jane Hanson (1791–1815), was married to Thomas Peabody Grosvenor (1778–1817), a U.S. Representative from New York. He attended local private schools and graduated from St. John's College in Annapolis in 1802.

=== Family ===
He was the grandson of John Hanson (1721–1783), a delegate to the Continental Congress who signed the Articles of Confederation and served as the 9th President of the Continental Congress, and Jane Contee (1726–1812), herself the granddaughter of Thomas Brooke, Jr. (1660–1730). Through his paternal grandmother's brother, Thomas Contee (1729–1793), he was related to Benjamin Contee (1755–1815) and Thomas Contee Worthington (1782–1847), William Grafton Delaney Worthington (1785–1856), and Walter Brooke Cox Worthington (1795–1845). His cousin, Rebecca Thomas (1777–1814), was married to another cousin, Alexander Contee Magruder (c. 1779–1853).

== Career ==
He proceeded to study law, was admitted to the bar, and commenced practice in Annapolis. He was a delegate to the Maryland State Convention of 1788, to vote whether Maryland should ratify the proposed Constitution of the United States. From 1811 to 1815, he served as a member of the Maryland House of Delegates.

=== Federal Republican ===
Hanson launched the Federal Republican and Commercial Gazette in Baltimore in 1808 and merged it with another publication the following year. The Federal Republican was known as one of the nation's most extreme Federalist newspapers. On June 22, 1812, four days after the beginning of the War of 1812, a mob that was irritated by his articles denouncing the administration destroyed his office. On July 28, he reissued the paper from another building, where he was joined by a group of armed allies. When that building was besieged by a mob, Hanson and his group fired, killing two. On the morning of July 29, Hanson and his group surrendered to Mayor Edward Johnson, who had come to personally defuse the situation, and were escorted to jail. That evening, the mob stormed the jail, and Hanson was beaten and left for dead. James M. Lingan, a military officer who came to Hanson's defense, died as a result of the violence. Hanson also received help from Revolutionary War Hero and father of Robert E. Lee, Henry Lee III, who received grave injuries. Another man John Thompson recounts being tarred and feathered by the mob and stated that the rioters brought a field gun to besiege Hanson's house, although the arrival of the mayor and other city officials stopped it from being fired. Hanson moved the paper to Georgetown, D.C., where he published it unmolested. Hanson later moved to Elkridge, Maryland.

=== United States Congress ===
In 1812, Hanson was elected as a Federalist representing the third district to the Thirteenth and Fourteenth Congresses, serving from March 4, 1813, until his resignation in 1816. Hanson was elected a member of the American Antiquarian Society in 1815. He was an unsuccessful candidate in 1816 for election to the Maryland House of Delegates, but was elected as a Federalist to the United States Senate to fill the vacancy caused by the resignation of Robert Goodloe Harper. He served as senator from December 20, 1816, until his own death on his estate, "Belmont", near Elkridge, Maryland. Hanson died without having ever fully recovered from his injuries.

== Personal life ==
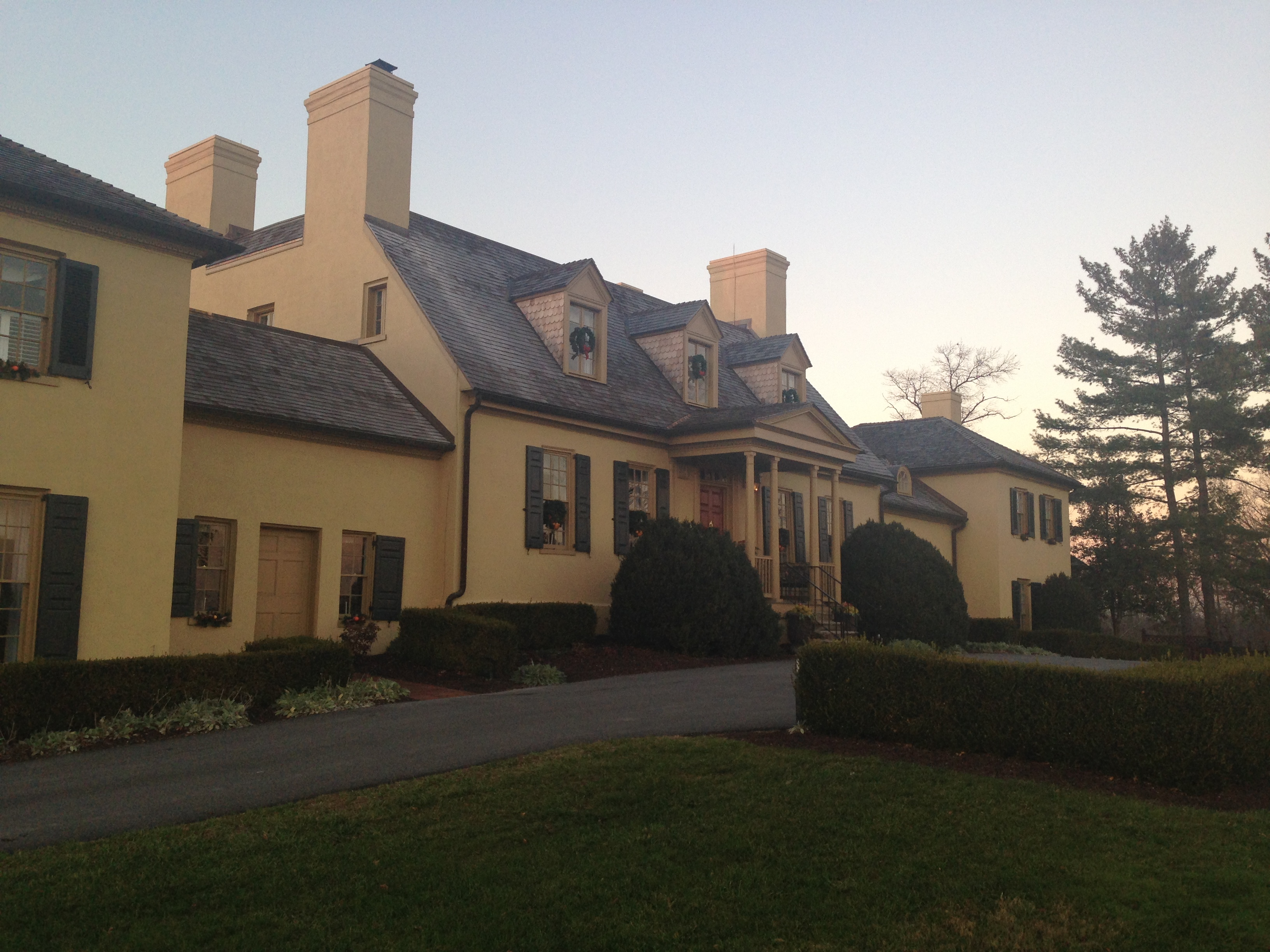
The family estate, "Belmont", near Elkridge, Maryland

On June 25, 1805, he was married to Priscilla Dorsey. They had many children, but only one lived to have heirs:

- Charles Grosvenor Hanson (1815/6–1880), who married Annie Maria Worthington (1821–1873), daughter of John Tolley Hood Worthington (1788–1849), on April 16, 1840.

He was interred in the family burial ground at his estate, Belmont.

=== Descendants ===
His grandchildren included Alexander Contee Hanson (1840–1857), Mary Worthington Hanson (1842–1863), John Worthington Hanson (1844–1916), Priscilla Hanson (1846–1925), Charles Edward Hanson (b. 1848), Murray Hanson (b. 1851), Samuel Contee Hanson (1854–1889), Grosvenor Hanson (1856–1916), Annie Maria "Nannie" Hanson (1858–1943), and Florence Contee Hanson (1860–1935).

== See also ==
- List of members of the United States Congress who died in office (1790–1899)

U.S. House of Representatives
Preceded by Philip Barton Key	Member of the U.S. House of Representatives from Maryland's 3rd congressional district 1813–1816	Succeeded by George Peter
U.S. Senate
Preceded by Robert G. Harper	U.S. senator (Class 1) from Maryland; 1816–1819; Served alongside: Robert H. Goldsborough, Edward Lloyd	Succeeded by William Pinkney
