= Governor Worthington =

Governor Worthington may refer to:

- Thomas Worthington (governor) (1773–1827), 6th Governor of Ohio
- William Grafton Delaney Worthington (1785–1856), Governor of the Territory of East Florida from 1821 to 1823
