= James Sprigg =

American politician

James Cresap Sprigg (1802 – October 3, 1852) was a United States representative from Kentucky. He was the brother of Michael Cresap Sprigg. He was born in Frostburg, Maryland in 1802 where he completed preparatory studies. Later, he moved to Shelbyville, Kentucky. He studied law and was admitted to the bar and practiced before holding several local offices.

Sprigg was a member of the Kentucky House of Representatives 1830–1834 and 1837–1840. He elected as a Whig to the Twenty-seventh Congress (March 4, 1841 – March 3, 1843) but was an unsuccessful candidate as an Independent for reelection in 1842 to the Twenty-eighth Congress. After Congress, he resumed the practice of law and was again a member of the Kentucky House of Representatives in 1852. He served until his death in Shelbyville, Kentucky in 1852. He was buried in Grove Hill Cemetery.

U.S. House of Representatives
Preceded by William J. Graves	Member of the U.S. House of Representatives from Kentucky's 8th congressional district 1841 – 1843	Succeeded by Garrett Davis
