= Luther Martin =

American Founding Father, politician, Anti-Federalist (1748–1826)

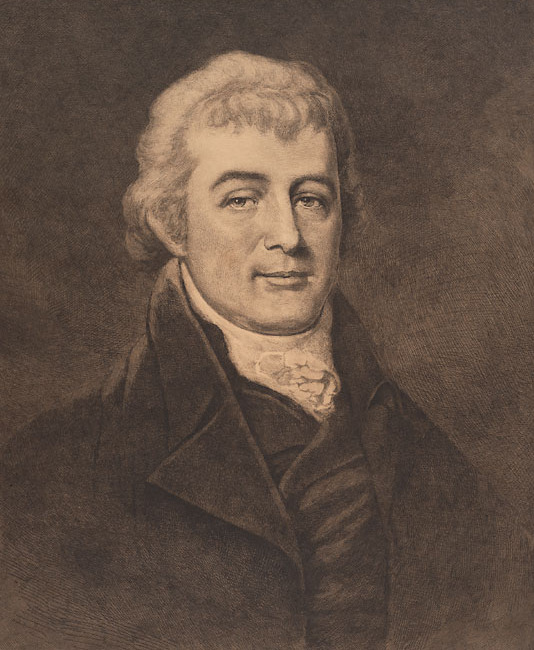
- Portrait of Martin

2nd and 7th Attorney General of Maryland
- In office 1818–1822
- Governor: Charles Carnan Ridgely; Charles Goldsborough; Samuel Sprigg
- Preceded by: John Montgomery
- Succeeded by: Thomas Beale Dorsey
- In office 1778 – December 1805
- Governor: See list: Thomas Johnson; Thomas Sim Lee; William Paca; William Smallwood; John Eager Howard; George Plater; James Brice; Thomas Sim Lee; John Hoskins Stone; John Henry; Benjamin Ogle; John Francis Mercer; Robert Bowie
- Preceded by: James Tilghman
- Succeeded by: William Pinkney

Personal details
- Born: February 20, 1748 New Brunswick, New Jersey, British America
- Died: July 10, 1826 (aged 78) New York City, U.S.
- Spouse: Maria Cresap (m. 1783)
- Children: 5
- Education: Princeton University (AB)

Luther Martin (February 20, 1748 – July 10, 1826) was a politician, lawyer and a Founding Father of the United States, framer of the U.S. Constitution. Martin was a delegate from Maryland to the Constitutional Convention in 1787, but did not sign the Constitution, having left the convention early because he felt the document as proposed violated states' rights. In the months following the convention, he was a leading Anti-Federalist, along with Patrick Henry and George Mason, whose collective efforts led to the passage of the Bill of Rights.

== Early life ==
Martin was an early advocate of American independence from Great Britain. In the fall of 1774, as a resident of Somerset County, Maryland, he served on the county's patriot committee and in December attended a convention of the Province of Maryland in Annapolis, which had been called to consider the recommendations of the Continental Congress. He went to the College of New Jersey (Princeton) and graduated with honors in 1766.

== Constitutional convention ==
In 1785, he was elected to the Confederation Congress by the Maryland General Assembly, but his numerous public and private duties prevented him from traveling to Philadelphia. Martin was elected as a delegate to the Constitutional Convention of 1787 in Philadelphia. When he arrived on June 9, 1787, he expressed suspicion of the secrecy rule imposed on the proceedings. He also opposed the creation of a government in which the large states would dominate the small ones, he consistently sided with the small states, helping to formulate the New Jersey Plan and voting against the Virginia Plan. On June 27, Martin spoke for more than three hours in opposition to the Virginia Plan's proposal for proportionate representation in both houses of the legislature.

He was opposed to the development of a strong central government. He was known for his ability to talk; as stated by William Pierce, "he was educated for the Bar... and he never speaks without tiring the patience of all who hear him."

Martin believed the legislative branch should be unicameral, proposed limiting the standing army during peacetime, and argued that the Convention had exceeded its powers by creating a national government when they were sent to Philadelphia "for the sole and express purpose of revising the Articles of Confederation."

Martin served on the committee formed to seek a compromise on representation, where he supported the case for equal numbers of delegates in at least one house. Before the convention closed, he became convinced that the new government would have too much power over state governments and would threaten individual rights. Failing to find any support for a bill of rights, Martin and another Maryland delegate, John Francis Mercer, walked out of the convention on September 3, 1787. He was one of the most vocal opponents of slavery at the Constitutional Convention, denouncing it as "inconsistent with the principles of the revolution and dishonorable to the American character."

== Ratification fight ==
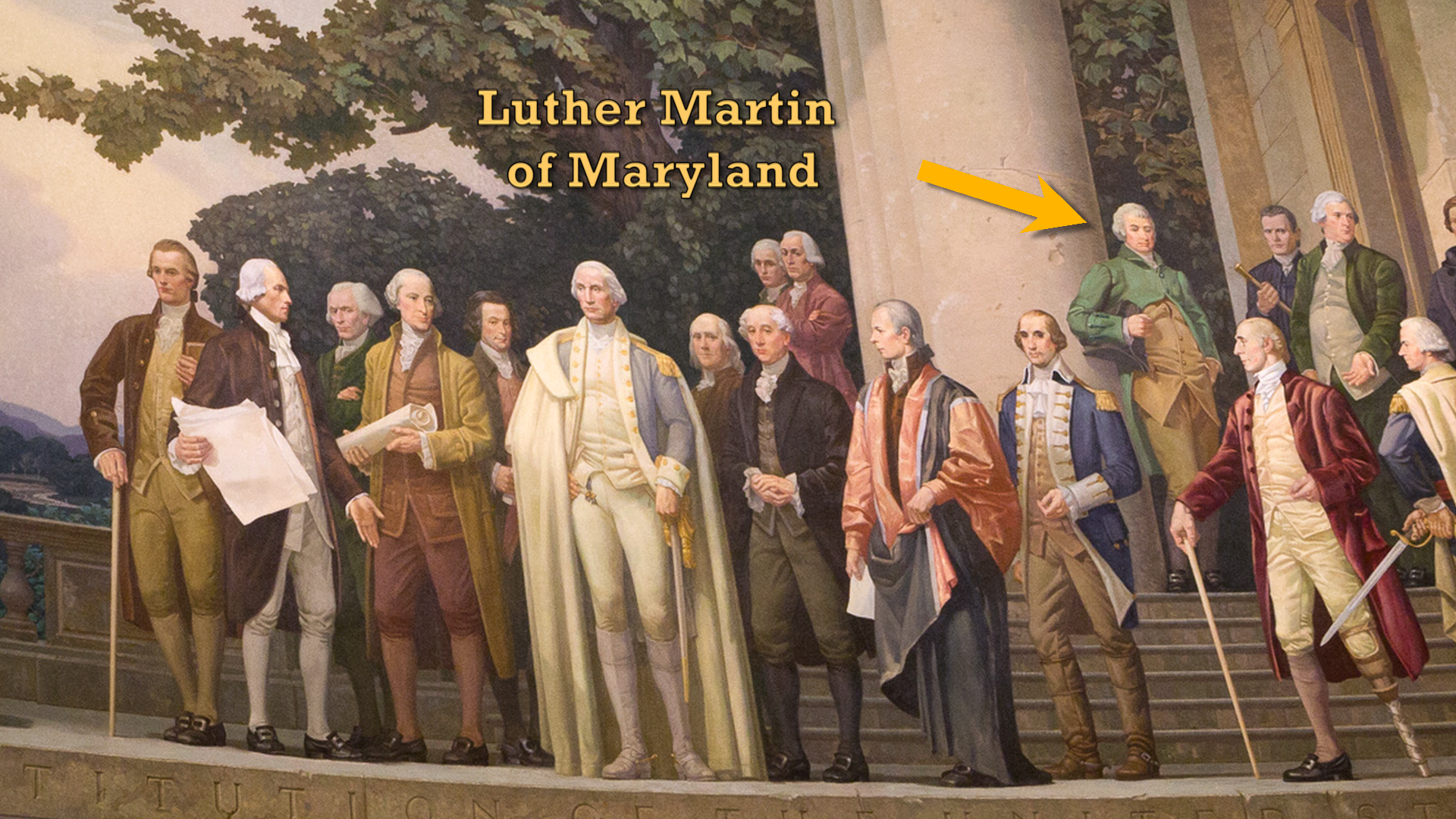
Martin among the Constitutional Convention delegates in the U.S. National Archives 1936 Faulkner Mural, located in the building's rotunda above the Charters of Freedom.

In November 1787, in a speech to the Maryland House of Delegates, he assailed the Constitutional Convention for what it was attempting to do and for how it was going about the job. He broke the pledge to secrecy under which the convention had met and informed the Maryland legislators that the convention had violated its instructions to meet "for the sole and express purpose of revising" the Articles of Confederation. Instead, convention delegates had taken it upon themselves to make a fresh start by creating an entirely new system of government. To Martin, such an effort was akin to launching a coup d'état. George Washington and Benjamin Franklin had backed the change of direction of the convention, but, Martin said, we should not "suffer our eyes to be so far dazzled by the splendor of names, as to run blindfolded into what may be our destruction."

In an address to the Maryland House of Delegates in November 1787 and in numerous newspaper articles, Martin attacked the proposed new form of government and continued to fight ratification of the Constitution through 1788. He lamented the ascension of the national government over the states and condemned what he saw as unequal representation in Congress. He owned six slaves of his own, but he opposed including slaves in determining representation (most slave owners supported counting slaves for the purposes of determining representation because this would increase the power of Slave States), and he believed that the absence of a jury in the U.S. Supreme Court gravely endangered freedom. At the convention, Martin complained, the aggrandizement of particular states and individuals often had been pursued more avidly than the welfare of the country. The assumption of the term "federal" by those who favored a national government also irritated Martin.

Martin served as a delegate to the Maryland State Convention of 1788, to vote whether Maryland should ratify the proposed Constitution of the United States. Most of the delegates at the convention ignored Martin's warnings. In April 1788, the majority of the delegates voted to ratify the Constitution, making Maryland the seventh state to do so. In June, when New Hampshire became the ninth state to ratify, the required threshold had been reached, and the new Constitution took effect. Three years later, the first 10 amendments were added.

== Legal career ==
In the beginning of the 19th century, Martin was defense counsel in two controversial national cases. In the first case, Martin won an acquittal for his close friend Supreme Court Justice Samuel Chase in his impeachment trial in 1805. Two years later, Martin was one of Aaron Burr's defense lawyers when Burr stood trial for treason in 1807.

After a record 28 consecutive years as state attorney general, Martin resigned in December 1805. In 1813, he became chief judge of the court of oyer and terminer for the City and County of Baltimore. He was reappointed attorney general of Maryland in 1818, and, in 1819, he argued Maryland's position in the landmark Supreme Court case McCulloch v. Maryland. The plaintiffs were represented by Daniel Webster, William Pinkney and William Wirt.

Martin's fortunes declined dramatically in his last years. Alcoholism, illness, and poverty weighed heavily on Martin, taking their toll as he aged. By the mid-1820s, he was subsisting on a special tax imposed on Maryland lawyers solely for his personal support. Eventually, he was taken in by Burr. By this time, detestation of Thomas Jefferson, his one-time decentralist ally, led Martin to embrace the Federalist Party, in apparent repudiation of everything he had argued for so strenuously. Paralysis, which had struck in 1819, forced him to retire as Maryland's attorney general in 1822.

== Death and legacy ==
On July 10, 1826, at the age of 78, Martin died in Burr's home in New York City and was buried in an unmarked grave in St. John's churchyard. His death came six days after the deaths on July 4 of Jefferson and John Adams.

Martin married Maria Cresap (daughter of Captain Michael Cresap) on Christmas Day 1783. Of their five children, three daughters lived to adulthood.

An extended display of his eloquence and volubility appears in "Modern Gratitude in Five Numbers: Addressed to Richard Raynall Keene, Esq. Concerning a Family Marriage" (1802)—a closely documented, fiercely argued (and partly autobiographical) denunciation of a former protégé who, against Martin's express wishes, had wooed and married Martin's daughter Eleonora.

== Notes ==
3 Larson, Edward J.; Winship, Michael P. (2005). The Constitutional Convention: A Narrative History from the Notes of James Madison. New York: The Modern Library. ISBN 0-8129-7517-0.

Legal offices
Preceded by James Tilghman	Attorney General of Maryland; 1778–1805	Succeeded by William Pinkney
Preceded by John Montgomery	Attorney General of Maryland; 1818–1822	Succeeded by Thomas Beale Dorsey
