= Saffell =

Saffell may refer to:

== People ==
- Oliver Saffell (born 1986), English cricket player
- Samuel Saffell (1712–1777), English-born American colonist; see Colonial families of Maryland
- Tom Saffell (1921–2012), American baseball player

== Places ==
- Saffell, Arkansas, United States
