= Edward Coote Pinkney =

American poet, lawyer, sailor, professor, and editor

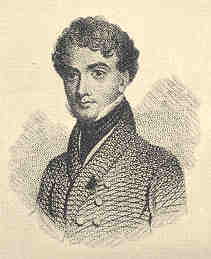
- Frontispiece from The Life and Works of Edward Coote Pinkney
- Born: October 1, 1802; London, England
- Died: April 11, 1828 (aged 25); Baltimore, Maryland, U.S.
- Resting place: Green Mount Cemetery; Baltimore, Maryland, U.S.
- Occupations: Sailor; Lawyer; Poet

Edward Coote Pinkney (aliter: Edward Coate Pinckney) (October 1, 1802 – April 11, 1828) was an American poet, lawyer, sailor, professor, and editor. Born in London in 1802 when his father was serving as ambassador to the Court of St. James, Pinkney returned with his family to the United States when he was eight. They returned to Maryland, where he attended a private school.

After attending college (academy level), he joined the United States Navy at age 13, and travelled throughout the Mediterranean and elsewhere. He later attempted a law career but was unsuccessful at building the business. He tried to join the Mexican army, but they did not accept him. He died of tuberculosis at the age of 25 in 1828.

Pinkney published several lyric poems inspired primarily by the work of British poets. American critic and poet Edgar Allan Poe supported Pinkney's work after his death, and other critics also praised him. Although Pinkney is sometimes called the first poet of the South, Poe suggested that Pinkney would have been more successful if he had been a New England writer.

== Biography ==
Pinkney was born the seventh of ten children on October 1, 1802, in London, where his father William Pinkney was U.S. ambassador to the Court of St. James. His mother, Anne Rodgers Pinkney, was the sister of Commodore John Rodgers. Pinkney lived with his family in London until he was eight; after they returned to the United States, he attended St. Mary's College of Maryland.

Just after his thirteenth birthday in 1815, Pinkney joined the United States Navy as a midshipman. He served until 1824, during which time he traveled to Italy, North Africa, the West Indies, and both coasts of South America. His defiance of what he called 'arbitrary authority' occasionally got him into trouble.

In 1824, two years after the death of his father, he left the Navy, married, read the law and was admitted to the bar in Maryland. Though he was well respected in his abilities as a lawyer, he had few clients and his practice failed. His wife, Georgiana McCausland, became a supportive and inspirational figure to him.

In 1823, Pinkney challenged fellow Baltimore lawyer and poet, John Neal to a duel in response to Neal's criticism of Pinkney's father in his 1823 novel, Randolph. Neal had written the novel just before the death of Pinkney's father, but it was released just after. The public battle between Pinkney and Neal involved Neal declining the duel challenge, and Pinkney declaring Neal a coward. Neal mocked this declaration in his next novel, also published in 1823.

After serving without a salary as the Professor of Rhetoric and Belles Lettres at the University of Maryland, Pinkney traveled to Mexico with the intention of joining the navy there. Disheartened after being rejected, he returned to Baltimore.

There, he became editor of a new semi-weekly newspaper, the Marylander, a publication founded to support the re-election of President John Quincy Adams. Its first issue was published December 3, 1827. His editorial association nearly brought him into a duel with the editor of Philadelphia-based Mercury, who supported Andrew Jackson.

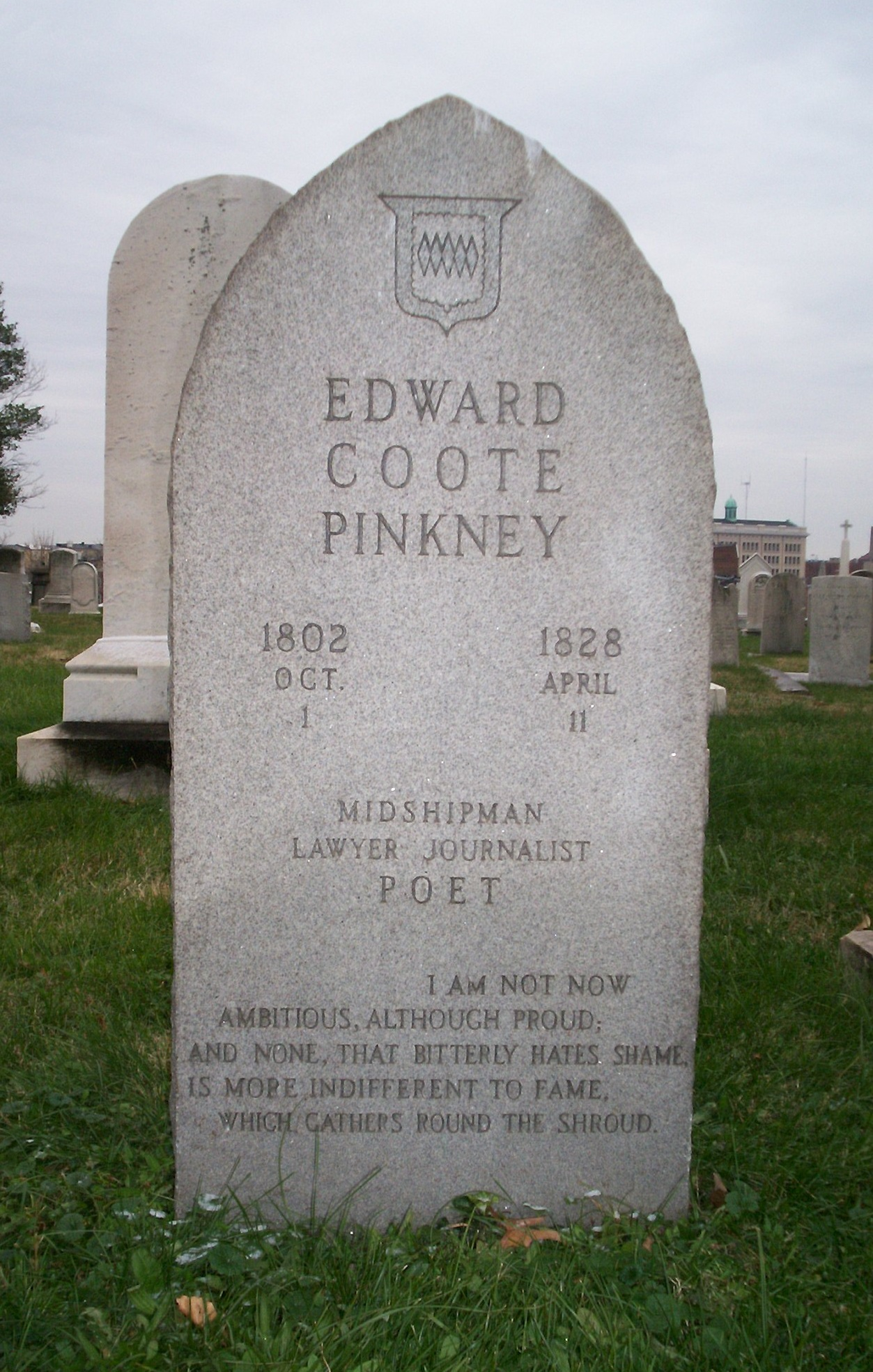
Grave of Pinkney in Green Mount Cemetery

Suffering from depression, Pinkney died of tuberculosis on April 11, 1828, at the age of 25. He was buried in Baltimore's Unitarian Cemetery. In May 1872, his body was moved to Green Mount Cemetery, also in Baltimore.

== Writing ==
Pinkney is often compared in his poetry with the Cavalier poets of Great Britain. He wrote several light, graceful, short poems, his longest being "Rudolph", which was published anonymously in 1825. His first full collection of poetry was published the same year. He was influenced by the work of Lord Byron, William Wordsworth, Walter Scott and other English writers. He was not influenced by American poets.

Pinkney was also inspired by classical works, which were part of an upper class education. He referred to such writers as Ovid, Herodotus, Horace, and Petrarch in his work. He was posthumously included in Rufus Wilmot Griswold's influential anthology The Poets and Poetry of America (1842).

== Critical assessment ==
Poet John Greenleaf Whittier was an admirer of Pinkney's work as was Edgar Allan Poe. The latter relied on Pinkney's poem, "A Health", to publicly woo Sarah Helen Whitman at a lecture in December 1848. Poe mentions "A Health" in his essay "The Poetic Principle" to exemplify his own aesthetic theory and the association between whiteness, purity, and love.

He wrote that Pinkney would have been better appreciated as a poet if he had been born in New England:

It was the misfortune of Mr. Pinckney to have been born too far south. Had he been born a New Englander, it is probable that he would have been ranked as the first of American lyricists, by that magnanimous cabal which has so long controlled the destinies of American Letters".

"A Health" was also praised in The Athenaum as "one of the prettiest things in American poetry." Another contemporary magazine ranked Pinkney among the top five poets of the United States at the time. The North American Review in January 1842, though questioning the moral tone of "Rudolph", concluded,

"The author evidently has much of the genuine spirit of poetry; his thoughts are occasionally bold and striking; some passages are wrought with much felicity of expression and clothed with a rich and glowing imagery... and [despite] a few minor imperfections, a highly poetical vein runs through the whole performance".
