= List of delegates to the Maryland State Convention (1788) =

From April 21 to April 28, 1788, delegates met to decide whether to ratify the Constitution of the United States. This list of delegates reports the men who made up the convention, and the counties or towns they represented.

George Plater served as president of the convention, and Wiliam Harwood served as secretary. On April 28, 1788, the convention ratified the Constitution of the United States, in a vote of 63 in favor and 11 opposed. The 63 delegates in favor signed their names to a written copy of the Constitution, making Maryland the only of the first thirteen states to sign their approval in ink.

== List of delegates ==
The following individuals served as delegates to the state convention.

Name	County represented
Nicholas Carroll	Annapolis
Alexander Contee Hanson	Annapolis
James McHenry	Baltimore Town
John Coulter	Baltimore Town
Jeremiah T. Chase	Anne Arundel County
Samuel Chase	Anne Arundel County
John F. Mercer	Anne Arundel County
Benjamin Harrison	Anne Arundel County
George Plater	St. Mary's County
Richard Barnes	St. Mary's County
Charles Shelton	St. Mary's County
Nicholas L. Sewell	St. Mary's County
William Tilghman	Kent County
Donaldson Yates	Kent County
Isaac Perkins	Kent County
William Granger	Kent County
Joseph Wilkinson	Calvert County
Charles Graham	Calvert County
Walter Smith	Calvert County
John Chesley	Calvert County
Zeph. Turner	Charles County
Gustavus R. Brown	Charles County
Michael J. Stone	Charles County
William Craik	Charles County
George Gale	Somerset County
John Stewart	Somerset County
John Gale	Somerset County
Henry Waggaman	Somerset County
Robert Goldsborough	Talbot County
Edward Lloyd	Talbot County
John Stevens	Talbot County
Jeremiah Banning	Talbot County
Robert Goldsborough	Dorchester County
Nich. Hammond	Dorchester County
James Shaw	Dorchester County
Daniel Sulivane	Dorchester County
Charles Ridgely	Baltimore County
Charles Ridgely of William	Baltimore County
Edward Cockey	Baltimore County
Nathan Cromwell	Baltimore County
Henry Hollingsworth	Cecil County
James G. Heron	Cecil County
Joseph Gilpin	Cecil County
William Evans	Cecil County
Fielder Bowie	Prince George's County
George Digges	Prince George's County
Osborn Sprigg	Prince George's County
Benjamin Hall	Prince George's County
James Tilghman, 3d	Queen Anne's County
James Hollyday	Queen Anne's County
William Hemsley	Queen Anne's County
John Seney	Queen Anne's County
John Done	Worcester County
Peter Chaille	Worcester County
William Morris	Worcester County
James Martin	Worcester County
Thomas Johnson	Frederick County
Thomas Sim Lee	Frederick County
Richard Potts	Frederick County
Abrahamn Faw	Frederick County
Luther Martin	Harford County
William Paca	Harford County
William Pinkney	Harford County
John Love	Harford County
William Richardson	Caroline County
Joseph Richardson	Caroline County
Matt. Driver	Caroline County
Peter Edmondson	Caroline County
John Stull	Washington County
Moses Rawlings	Washington County
Thomas Sprigg	Washington County
Henry Shryock	Washington County
Benjamin Edwards	Montgomery County
Richard Thomas	Montgomery County
Thomas Cramphin	Montgomery County
William Deakins, Jr.	Montgomery County

== Notes ==
At the time, Howard County did not exist yet. It was separated from Anne Arundel County and named the Howard District of Anne Arundel County in 1839. In 1851, it was established as Howard County.

Alleghany County did not exist yet. It was separated from Washington County in 1789.

Garrett County did not exist yet. It was separated from Allegheny County in 1872.

== See also ==
- Text of Resolution of Ratification of the Constitution of the United States by Maryland via Wikisource
