= John Fendall (disambiguation) =

John Fendall may refer to:

- John Fendall I (1672–1734), of Clivedon Hall, planter, justice, member of Lower House
- John Fendall of Cedar Point (1730–1763), of Charles County, Maryland of the Fendall family
- John Fendall (1762–1825), governor of Java and Bengal, member of British East India Company
- John W. Fendall (1784–1842), midshipman during the Tripolitan War, and an army lieutenant during the War of 1812
