= Nelson Homestead =

Historic house in Maryland, United States

- U.S. National Register of Historic Places
- Location within Maryland Location within the United States
- Location: Cash Corner and Hopewell-Bedsworth Rds., Crisfield, Maryland
- Coordinates: 37°59′29″N 75°49′38″W
- Area: 5.5 acres (2.2 ha)
- Built: 1836
- Built by: Riggin, Elisha
- Architectural style: Federal
- NRHP reference No.: 85002175
- Added to NRHP: September 12, 1985

Nelson Homestead, also known as the Elisha Riggin House, is a historic home located at Crisfield, Somerset County, Maryland. It is a "telescope" style frame house built circa 1836 by Crisfield shipbuilder Elisha Riggin on a 145.5-acre tract of land overlooking Johnson Creek. The Riggins are one of the Colonial families of Maryland who immigrated to the Chesapeake Colonies from Ireland in the mid-17th century and settled along Pocomoke Sound.

The three-part wood-frame structure rests on a brick pier foundation and is covered by a series of gable roofs. The main part of the house is a three bay structure with a central door. It is attached to a two bay two story structure with central door and a lower roofline, with a two-bay one-story kitchen wing attached. A large brick chimney rises from the east end of the main block and a smaller stack protrudes through the east end of the kitchen wing. About 95% of the original interior woodwork is intact along with some early paint schemes. The finely crafted house is sheathed in cypress and cedar weatherboards and features late Federal style mantels, doors, chair rails and cupboards. The main room of the house has raised panel wainscoting and over-mantel paneling that survives with an early layer of tiger-maple graining. Also on the property is a small frame outbuilding with a gable roof and a family cemetery.

Several other "telescope" style houses remain on the lower Eastern Shore of Maryland, but this house stands out as one of the least altered examples with highly unusual woodwork. Unlike most telescope style houses on the Eastern Shore all three blocks of this one appear to have been built at the same time. Due to construction features, mature cut nails, and some Greek Revival influence in part of the woodwork, it is thought the house was built as late as 1836 with paneling traditions and Federal mantel designs that were common in earlier decades. The Elisha Riggin House was listed on the National Register of Historic Places in 1985. In 2014 it was included in the top 10 most important endangered historic properties by Preservation Maryland / Endangered Maryland

William Nelson and his wife Ellen Riggin, a relative of Elisha Riggin, purchased the property in 1843 and it remained in the Nelson family until the 1966. The current owner, Jennifer Smith of the band Naked Blue is currently working on rescuing the building and re-purposing it as an artist retreat, music education and heritage tourism site.
