= Michael Sprigg =

American politician (1791–1845)

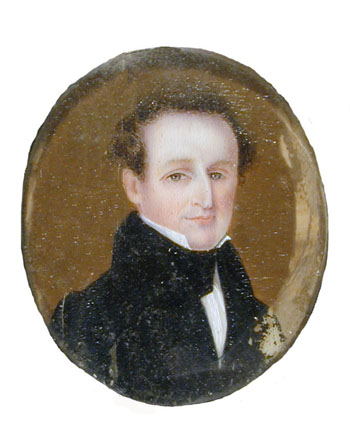

Member of the U.S. House of Representatives from Maryland's 4th district
- In office March 4, 1827 – March 3, 1831
- Preceded by: Thomas Contee Worthington
- Succeeded by: Francis Thomas

President of the Chesapeake and Ohio Canal Company
- In office 1841–1842

Member of the Maryland House of Delegates
- In office 1821, 1823, 1837, 1840, 1844

Personal details
- Born: Michael Cresap Sprigg; July 1, 1791 Frostburg, Maryland, U.S.
- Died: December 18, 1845 (aged 54) Cumberland, Maryland, U.S.
- Resting place: Rose Hill Cemetery, Cumberland, Maryland, U.S.
- Party: Jacksonian
- Relatives: James Sprigg (brother)
- Profession: Politician

Michael Cresap Sprigg (July 1, 1791 – December 18, 1845) was a U.S. representative from Maryland, brother of James Cresap Sprigg.

Born in Frostburg, Maryland, Sprigg completed preparatory studies. He held a number of local offices, and served as member of the Maryland House of Delegates in 1821, 1823, 1837, 1840, and 1844. He served as president of the Chesapeake and Ohio Canal Company in 1841 and 1842.

Sprigg was elected as a Jacksonian to the Twentieth and Twenty-first Congresses, serving from March 4, 1827, to March 3, 1831. In Congress, he served as chairman of the Committee on Expenditures on Public Buildings (Twentieth and Twenty-first Congresses). He died in Cumberland, Maryland, and is interred in Rose Hill Cemetery.

U.S. House of Representatives
Preceded by Thomas Contee Worthington	Member of the U.S. House of Representatives from Maryland's 4th congressional district 1827–1831	Succeeded by Francis Thomas
