= William Pinkney =

American politician (1764–1822)

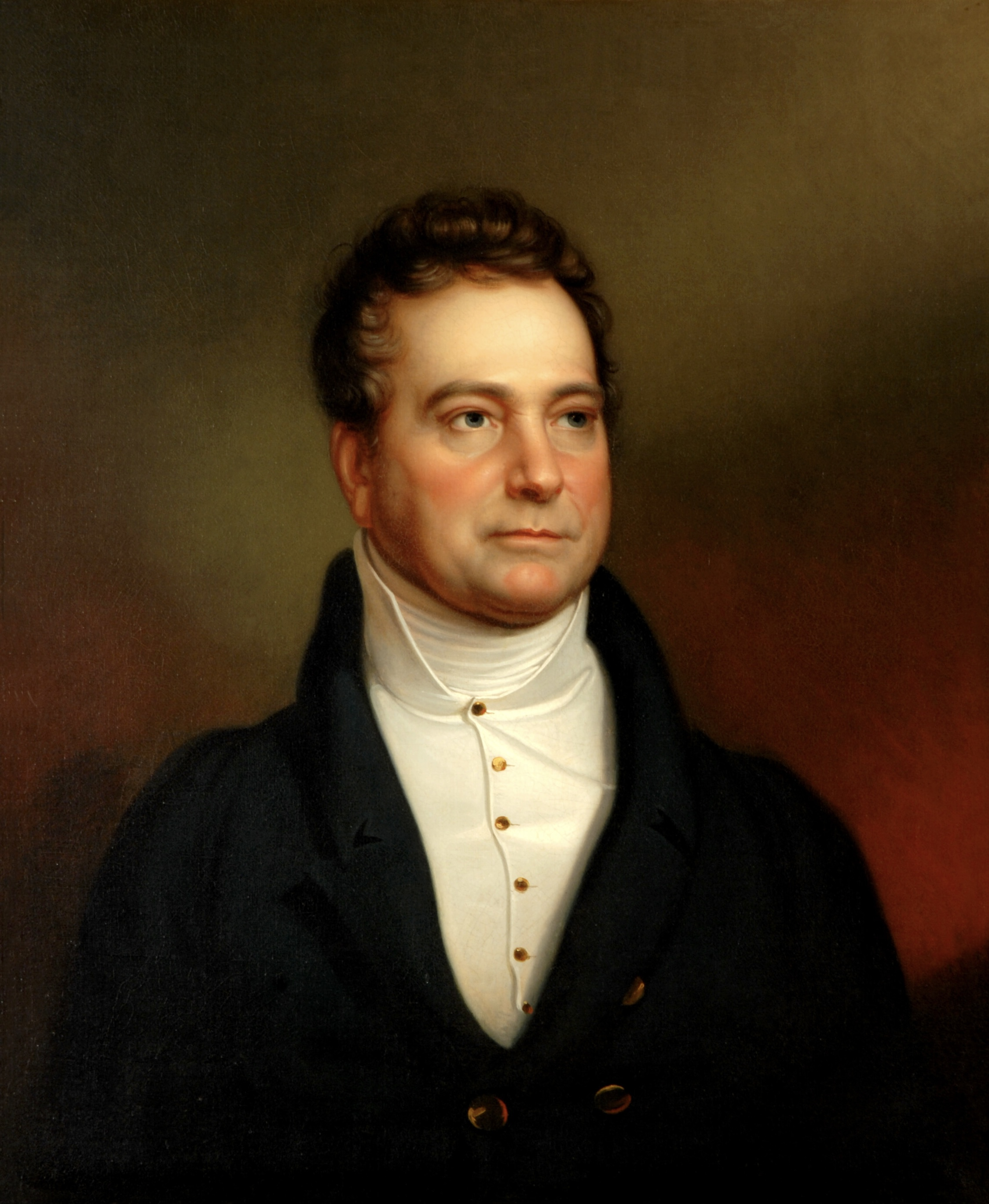
- Portrait by Rembrandt Peale, c. 1817

United States Senator from Maryland
- In office December 21, 1819 – February 25, 1822
- Preceded by: Alexander Hanson
- Succeeded by: Samuel Smith

2nd United States Envoy to Russia
- In office January 13, 1817 – February 14, 1818
- President: James Madison; James Monroe
- Preceded by: John Quincy Adams
- Succeeded by: George W. Campbell

Member of the U.S. House of Representatives from Maryland's 5th district
- In office March 4, 1815 – April 18, 1816
- Preceded by: Alexander McKim
- Succeeded by: Peter Little

7th United States Attorney General
- In office December 11, 1811 – February 10, 1814
- President: James Madison
- Preceded by: Caesar Augustus Rodney
- Succeeded by: Richard Rush

Member of the Maryland Senate
- In office 1811

5th United States Minister to the United Kingdom
- In office April 27, 1808 – May 7, 1811
- President: Thomas Jefferson; James Madison
- Preceded by: James Monroe
- Succeeded by: Jonathan Russell (Acting)

3rd Attorney General of Maryland
- In office 1805–1806
- Governor: Robert Bowie
- Preceded by: Luther Martin
- Succeeded by: John Thomson Mason

Mayor of Annapolis
- In office 1794–1795
- Preceded by: James Williams
- Succeeded by: Allen Quynn

Member of the U.S. House of Representatives from Maryland's 3rd district
- In office March 4, 1791 – November 9, 1791
- Preceded by: Benjamin Contee
- Succeeded by: John Mercer

Member of the Maryland House of Delegates
- In office 1788–1792
- In office 1795

Personal details
- Born: March 17, 1764 Annapolis, Province of Maryland, British America
- Died: February 25, 1822 (aged 57) Washington, D.C., U.S.
- Party: Democratic-Republican
- Spouse: Ann Rodgers
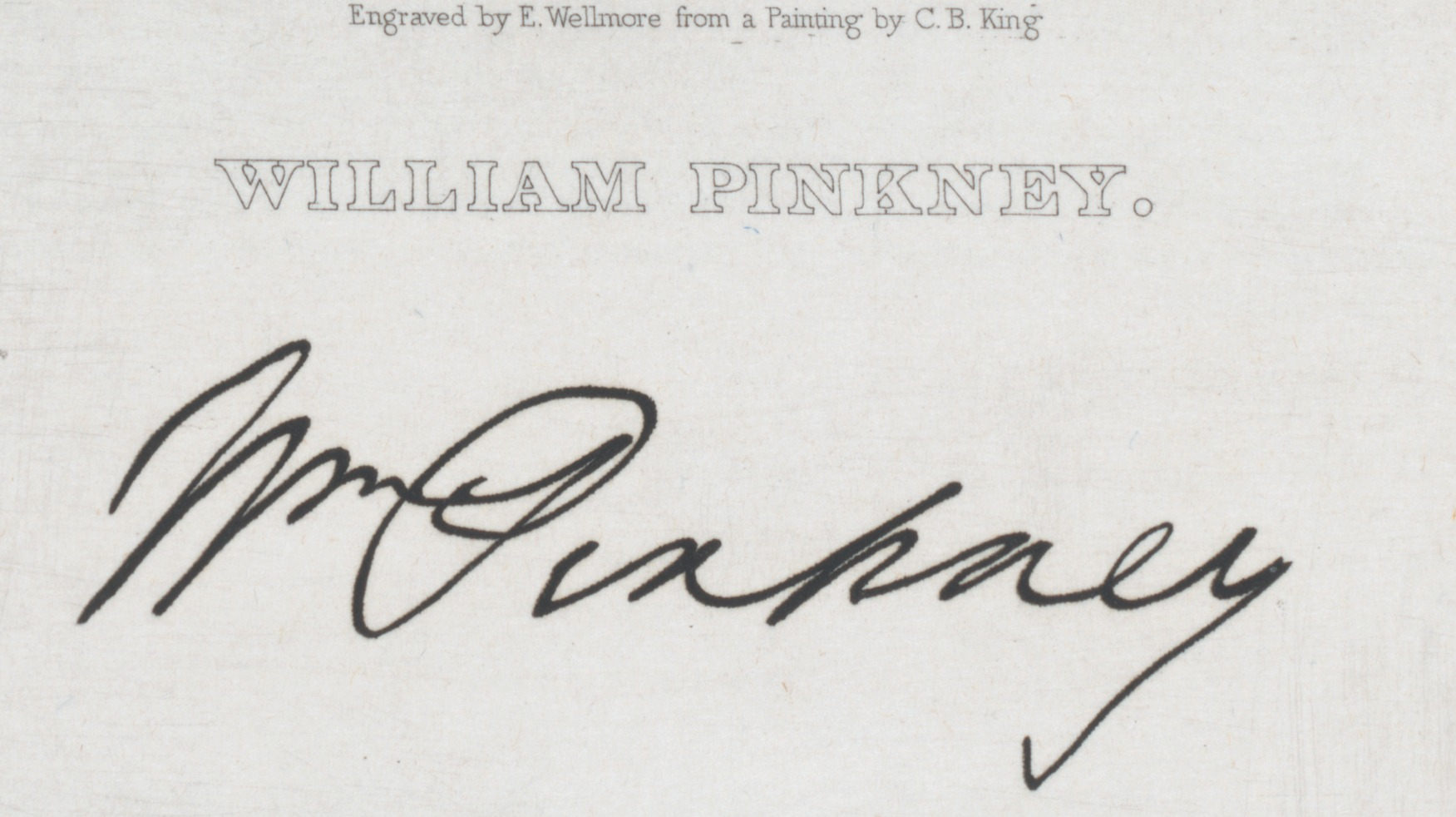
- Signature

Military service
- Branch: US Army
- Service years: 1812-1814
- Rank: Major
- Battles/wars: War of 1812; Battle of Bladensburg

William Pinkney (March 17, 1764 – February 25, 1822) was an American statesman and diplomat, and was appointed the seventh U.S. attorney general by President James Madison.

== Early life and education ==
Pinkney was born in 1764 in Annapolis in the Province of Maryland, then one of the Thirteen Colonies of British America. His parents' home was on the banks of the Severn River, from where the family could see the Chesapeake Bay. He had English ancestry.

Pinkney attended King William School, a private school, which is now St. John's College. His teacher was a Mr. Brefhard. Although Pinkney left school at age 13, he had impressed his teacher with his intelligence, and Brefhard agreed to give the youth private lessons at home.

Pinkney studied medicine (which he did not practice) and read the law with an established firm, as was the practice at the time for aspiring lawyers. He was admitted to the bar in 1786. After practicing law for two years in Harford County, Maryland, Pinkney was elected as a delegate to Maryland's state constitutional convention.

Pinkney was an excellent orator who possessed an impressive command of language. He was said to have been articulate and pleasing in manner.

After beginning his law practice, he married Anne Rodgers. They had ten children together. Edward Coote Pinkney, born seventh, was ranked as an accomplished poet posthumously.

== Career ==
In April 1788, Pinkney was elected a delegate to the convention of the State of Maryland, which ratified the United States Constitution. This marked the beginning of his political career.

He was elected to and served in the Maryland House of Delegates from 1788 to 1792 and then again in 1795. He was elected mayor of Annapolis, serving from 1795 to 1800.

He was elected in 1790 as a U.S. Congressman from Maryland's 3rd congressional district, serving in 1791. After the War of 1812, Pinkney was elected in 1814 from the fifth district, and served from 1815 until 1816.

In 1801, the U.S. President Thomas Jefferson appointed him Attorney General for the District of Pennsylvania. Jefferson next appointed him as Attorney General of Maryland, where he served from 1805 to 1806.

Pinkney was nominated as a diplomat, serving with James Monroe as co-U.S. Ministers to the Court of St James's in Great Britain, 1806 to 1807. President Jefferson asked them to negotiate an end to harassment of American shipping, but Britain showed no signs of improving relations. The men negotiated the Monroe–Pinkney Treaty, but it lacked provisions to end British impressment of American sailors, and was subsequently rejected by President Jefferson and never implemented.

Pinkney was Minister Plenipotentiary from 1808 until 1811. He returned to Maryland, serving in the Maryland State Senate in 1811. In 1811 he joined President James Madison's cabinet as his Attorney General.

He was commissioned as a major in the United States Army during the War of 1812 and was wounded at the Battle of Bladensburg, Maryland in August 1814. After the War, he served as congressman from the fifth district of Maryland from 1815 to 1816. He was next appointed by President James Monroe as the U.S. Minister Plenipotentiary to Russia from 1816 until 1818, along with a special mission to the Kingdom of Naples.

Pinkney successfully argued many important cases before the Supreme Court, including the landmark case of McCulloch v. Maryland (1819), in which the right of the U.S. Congress to charter the Bank of the United States was upheld.

In 1818, Pinkney was elected by the state legislature as a U.S. Senator from Maryland, serving from 1819 until his death in 1822. He is buried at the Congressional Cemetery in Washington, D.C.

== Criticism ==
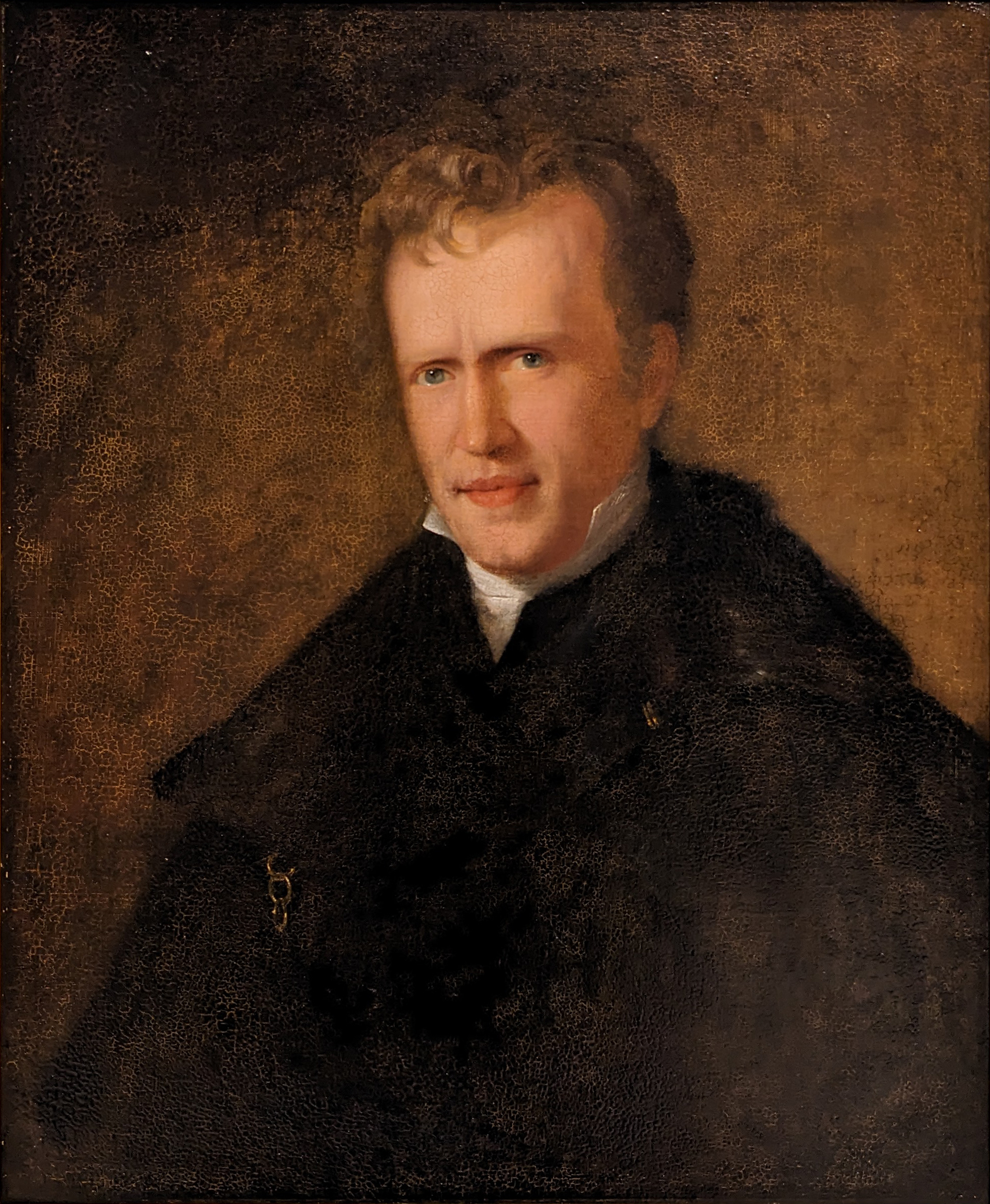
Pinkney critic John Neal

Writer, critic, and fellow Baltimore lawyer John Neal dedicated eight pages in his 1823 novel Randolph to criticizing William Pinkney. Though written before Pinkney's death, it was published shortly afterward with a footnote explaining that the author acknowledged Pinkney's death but decided to publish the book as originally written anyway. Though Neal referred to him as "the greatest lawyer in America," he also characterized his speeches as "a compound of stupendous strength; feeble ornament; affected earnestness, and boisterous, turbulent declamation," concluding that "God never meant William Pinkney for an orator." Neal's insults went as far as to call Pinkney "a notorious sloven" who could be seen "wiping his nose and lips on the sleeve of his coat."

On the basis of these printed insults, Pinkney's son Edward Coote Pinkney challenged Neal to a duel, which Neal refused. The episode likely contributed to Neal's decision to leave Baltimore later that year.

== See also ==
- List of members of the United States Congress who died in office (1790–1899)

== Bibliography ==
- Hayes, Kevin J. (2008). The Road to Monticello: The Life and Mind of Thomas Jefferson. Oxford University Press. ISBN 978-0-19-530758-0.
- Ireland, Robert M. (1986). The legal career of William Pinkney, 1764-1822. Garland, 333 pages. Book
- Lease, Benjamin (1972). That Wild Fellow John Neal and the American Literary Revolution. Chicago, Illinois: University of Chicago Press. ISBN 0-226-46969-7.
- Neal, John (1823). Randolph, A Novel. Philadelphia, Pennsylvania: For Whom It May Concern.
- Pinkney, Reverend William (nephew) (1853). The life of William Pinkney. D. Appleton and Company, New York. e'Book
- Sears, Donald A. (1978). John Neal. Boston, Massachusetts: Twayne Publishers. ISBN 080-5-7723-08.
- Wheaton, Henry (1826). Some account of the life, writings, and speeches of William Pinkney. J. W. Palmer & co. e'Book
- "PINKNEY, William, (1764 - 1822)". Biographical Directory of the U.S. Congress.
- "William Pinkney, United States statesman". Encyclopædia Britannica.
- "Annals of Congress, House of Representatives, 2nd Congress, 1st Session". American Memory.

U.S. House of Representatives
Preceded by Benjamin Contee	Member of the U.S. House of Representatives from Maryland's 3rd congressional district 1791	Succeeded by John Francis Mercer
Preceded by Alexander McKim	Member of the U.S. House of Representatives from Maryland's 5th congressional district 1815–1816	Succeeded by Peter Little
Political offices
Preceded by James Williams	Mayor of Annapolis; 1794–1795	Succeeded by Allen Quynn
Legal offices
Preceded by Luther Martin	Attorney General of Maryland; 1805–1806	Succeeded by John Thomson Mason
Preceded by Caesar A. Rodney	U.S. Attorney General; Served under: James Madison; 1811–1814	Succeeded by Richard Rush
Diplomatic posts
Preceded by James Monroe	U.S. Minister to Great Britain; 1807–1811	Succeeded by John Quincy Adams
Preceded by John Quincy Adams	U.S. Minister to Russia; 1816–1818	Succeeded by George W. Campbell
U.S. Senate
Preceded by Alexander C. Hanson	U.S. senator (Class 1) from Maryland; 1819–1822; Served alongside: Edward Lloyd	Succeeded by Samuel Smith
