= Thomas Contee Worthington =

American politician (1782–1847)

Member of the U.S. House of Representatives from Maryland's 4th district
- In office March 4, 1825 – March 3, 1827
- Preceded by: John Lee
- Succeeded by: Michael Sprigg

Member of the Maryland House of Delegates
- In office 1818–1825

Personal details
- Born: November 25, 1782 Annapolis, Maryland, U.S.
- Died: April 12, 1847 (aged 64) Frederick, Maryland, U.S.
- Resting place: Mount Olivet Cemetery
- Parent(s): William Worthington; Jane Contee
- Relatives: William Worthington (brother); Walter Worthington (brother); Thomas Contee (grandfather); Benjamin Contee (uncle)
- Occupation: Lawyer

Thomas Contee Worthington (November 25, 1782 – April 12, 1847) was an American politician who served as a U.S. Representative from Maryland. He was a descendant of Philip Lee, of the Lee family of Virginia.

== Early life ==
Thomas Contee Worthington was born on November 25, 1782, near Annapolis, Maryland. He was the son of William Worthington III (1747–1820) and Jane Contee (1760–1825). His maternal grandparents were Sarah Fendall (1732–1793) and Thomas Contee (1729–1793), himself the grandson of Thomas Brooke, Jr. (1660–1730). His brothers were William Grafton Delaney Worthington IV (1785–1856), judge and state governor, and secretary of the Territory of East Florida and Walter Brooke Cox Worthington (1795–1845), a member of the Maryland House of Delegates. Worthington received a limited schooling. He was a descendant of Philip Lee, of the Lee family of Virginia.

Through his maternal grandfather's sister, Jane Contee (1726–1812), who was married to John Hanson (1721–1783), a delegate to the Continental Congress who signed the Articles of Confederation and served as the 9th President of the Continental Congress, he was related to Alexander Contee Hanson (1786–1819), also a U.S. Representative, and later, U.S. Senator from Maryland. He was also the nephew of Benjamin Contee, an Episcopal priest, officer in the Revolutionary War, delegate to the Confederation Congress, and member of the first United States House of Representatives.

== Career ==
He served as a captain in the War of 1812, and later as brigadier general of the Ninth Brigade of the Maryland Militia from 1818 to 1847. He studied law, was admitted to the bar in 1817, and commenced practice in Annapolis, Maryland. He later moved to Frederick, Maryland, in 1818 to serve in the Maryland House of Delegates, and continued the practice of law.

Worthington was a slave owner.

=== United States Congress ===
Worthington was elected to the Nineteenth Congress, where he served from March 4, 1825, to March 3, 1827. He resumed the practice of law in Frederick, and also served as member of the executive council in 1830 under the first State constitution.

== Personal life ==
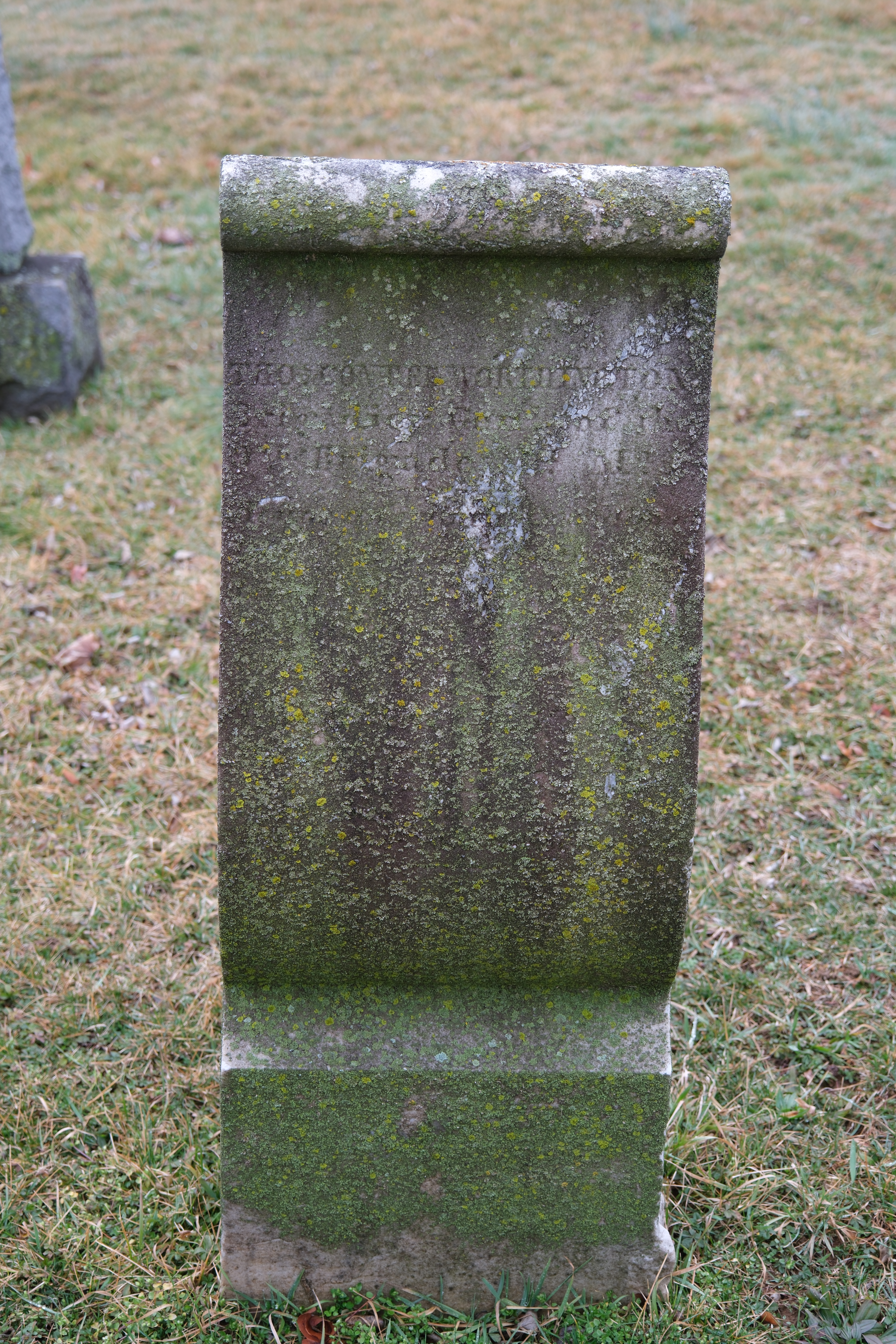
Grave of Worthington in Mount Olivet Cemetery

He died in Frederick, and was interred in Mount Olivet Cemetery.

U.S. House of Representatives
Preceded by John Lee	Member of the U.S. House of Representatives from Maryland's 4th congressional district 1825–1827	Succeeded by Michael Sprigg
