= Nottingham, Prince George's County, Maryland =

- Nottingham Site
- U.S. National Register of Historic Places
- Nearest city: Upper Marlboro, Maryland
- NRHP reference No.: 75002083
- Added to NRHP: May 12, 1975

Nottingham is a small town on the Patuxent River in Prince George's County, Maryland, United States. It contains an archaeological site which was listed on the National Register of Historic Places in 1975.

== Pre-European era ==
The Nottingham site is an archaeological site located on a terrace of the Patuxent River, near Upper Marlboro, Prince George's County, Maryland. The site contains an important record of more than 5000 years of prehistory, including Middle Archaic (c. 6000 BC) through Late Woodland (1600 AD) materials. Of particular note are a sizable Middle Woodland Selby Bay component, and a large Late Woodland component (c. 1550–1600 AD) which may correspond to the village of Mattpament depicted on John Smith's 1608 map.

== Colonial settlement ==
The Bowie family settled in this area during the colonial period, building a number of homes including "Mattaponi".

Between 1751 and 1771, nine British ships brought about 1,800 captive Africans to the port of Nottingham. In 1762, 183 captives disembarked at Nottingham from the ship Charming Molly, captained by James Beard. On August 27, 1770, captives recently arrived from Gambia in the snow Peggy, captained by William Sharp, were offered for sale at Nottingham. The sale was arranged by Barnes and Ridgate, of Port Tobacco, Maryland.

Benjamin Contee was born at "Brookfield" near Nottingham in 1815.
