= Walter Brooke Cox Worthington =

American politician (1795–1845)

Walter Brooke Cox Worthington (September 19, 1795 - 1845) was a member of the Maryland House of Delegates. He was a descendant of the Lee Family of Virginia.

== Early life ==
Worthington was born September 19, 1795, at "The Valley", near Nottingham, Maryland. He was the son of William Worthington III (1747–1820) and Jane Contee (1761–1825). He was the brother of Thomas Contee Worthington (1782–1847), a U.S. Representative from Maryland, and William Grafton Delaney Worthington IV (1785–1856).

His maternal grandparents were Sarah Fendall (1732–1793) and Thomas Contee (1729–1793), himself the grandson of Thomas Brooke, Jr. (1660–1730). Through his maternal grandfather's sister, Jane Contee (1726–1812), who was married to John Hanson (1721–1783), a delegate to the Continental Congress who signed the Articles of Confederation and served as the 9th President of the Continental Congress, he was related to Alexander Contee Hanson (1786–1819), also a U.S. Representative, and later, U.S. Senator from Maryland.

He was educated in Nottingham and in Baltimore, where after leaving school, he entered a mercantile house, and remained until he had gained a practical business training.

== Career ==
He returned to Prince George's County shortly after reaching his majority and took charge of the estate devised him by his grandfather, Col. Thomas Contee, consisting of part of "Brookefield". Upon the death of his mother, he inherited the estate "The Valley" or "Vale of Tempe", and he devoted himself to agriculture for the rest of his life. This was located on the original tract of land called "Brookefield". Walter enlarged "The Valley" by purchasing adjoining fields, making it a farm of 600 acres (2.4 km^{2}), and acquired several other estates in the same neighborhood, including the one known as "Half Pone", or "Leith", which he bought from Fielder Bowie (currently at the end of Croom Airport Road in Patuxent River Park, Croom, Maryland.) At the time of his death he owned more than 2,000 acres (8 km^{2}), and more than a hundred enslaved people.

=== Politics ===
In 1834, Walter consented to and accepted the nomination for State Legislature, and was elected. He served one term, and declined to stand for re-election.

He resided in the brick house "still standing in 1899" on the "Half Pone" plantation, but owing to its proximity to the river suffered from malaria, and in his will directed that the land be sold on this account. Henrietta died of pneumonia on March 20, 1843, and Walter removed his children to Nottingham, where he resided with his mother-in-law until August 2, 1845, when he died suddenly of apoplexy. He was buried at "The Valley".

== Personal life ==
Walter married Henrietta Priscilla (nee Waring) Oden (1801–1843) on November 6, 1827. Henrietta, who was born in Nottingham, Prince George's Co., Maryland, was previously married, in 1822, to Benjamin Oden, Jr. (1799–1823), of "Bellefields." He died shortly thereafter and had no children with Oden. Together with Walter, Henrietta had:

- Elizabeth Margaret Worthington (1834–1912), who married Maj. Thomas Fielder Bowie, Jr. (1836–1896), son of Gen. Thomas Fielder Bowie, Sr. (1808–1869) and his first wife, Catherine Harrison Waring (1807–1849).
- Laura Worthington (1836), who married Maj. Robert Withers Harper (1833–1863), Son of Dr. James Harper, Jr. (1797–1871) and Ellen Whittaker.
- Henry Clay Worthington (1838–1852), who never married.
- William Worthington (1839–1871), who married Sarah Louise "Minnie" Bowie (1838–1922), daughter of Gen. Thomas Fielder Bowie, Sr. (1808–1869) and first wife, Catherine Harrison Waring (1807–1849).
- Henrietta Priscilla Waring Worthington (1844–1919), who never married.

"Bellefields" was built in the 1720s for the Sim family, which included Revolutionary leader Col. Joseph Sim, Sr. (1725–1793). Early in the nineteenth century, it became the home of Benjamin Oden, Jr. It was while Benjamin resided there that American leaders observed the approach of British troops in August 1814. The estate is located at 13104 Duley Station Road, Croom, Prince George's Co., Maryland.

== Ancestry ==
Walter was the son of William Worthington (1747–1820) and Jane Contee (1761–1825).

Jane was the daughter of Col. Thomas Contee (1729–1811) and Sarah Fendall (1732–1793).

William was the son of Vornel Worthington (1719–1749) and Ann Hammond (1730).

Ann was the daughter of Thomas John Hammond and Anne Cockey (1704).

Vornel was the son of William Worthington, Sr. (1694–1770) and Sarah Homewood (1700).

Sarah was the daughter of Capt. James Homewood and Mary Peasley.

William Sr., was the son of Capt. John Worthington (1650–1701) and Sarah Howard (d. 1726), who married 2nd, Capt. John Brice, Gent. (d. 1713).

Sarah was the daughter of Matthew Howard II (c. 1640 – 1692) and Sarah Dorsey.

John was the son of Francis Worthington (1624) and Sarah Byron (1625–1664).

Francis was the son of Roger Worthington (1593–1649) and Katherine Haywood (1587–1651).

Roger was the son of Thomas Worthington (1570–1626) and Agnes Gillebrand (1570–1626).

Thomas was the son of Roger Worthington (c. 1544 – 1604) and Margaret Brownlowe (c. 1547 – 1640).
