= Brookefield =

Brookefield, Bangalore
- Neighbourhood
- Location within Bengaluru
- Coordinates: 12.9657°N 77.7188°E
- Country: India
- State: Karnataka
- Metro: Bangalore

Government
  - Body: BBMP

Languages
  - Official: Kannada
- Time zone: UTC+5:30 (IST)
- Postal code: 560037
- Vehicle registration: KA 53

Brookefield is a neighbourhood of Bangalore. It is a wealthy area, with high real estate prices and relatively new commercial enterprises on roads such as ITPL road. Currently, it is a hub for IT professionals, students, young families, hoteliers and entrepreneurs. Brookefield is home to many cafes, hotels, IT parks, restaurants, retail stores, cultural associations, apartment complexes, showrooms and student accommodations.

Many prominent IT companies like IBM, SAP and Accenture have opened offices here in IT parks such as International Tech Park Bangalore (ITPB) and Prestige Technostar. Tata Group also plans on constructing a sprawling office for its IT branch, Tata Consultancy Services [TCS].

On 2nd March 2024, an IED bomb blast occurred in a popular South Indian restaurant, injuring 9 people. Official investigations revealed that radicals and extremists could have been behind the attack.

Brookefield, as with most other localities of Bengaluru, comes under the jurisdiction of the BBMP (Bruhat Bengaluru Mahanagara Palike). A unique feature of Brookefield is that its residents often solve issues pertaining to potholes, pedestrian safety and civil infra via crowdfunding.

== Etiology ==
Before Brookefield became the tech and residential corridor it is today, the area around Kundalahalli was mostly open land. In the late 20th century, Brooke Bond India established its sprawling corporate head office and campus there. The massive presence of the Brooke Bond facility famous for its flagship tea brands like Red Label, Taj Mahal, and Taaza, the entire surrounding locality adopted the name Brookefield (Direct play on Brooke Bond and the open fields of the area). Brooke Bond India eventually merged into Hindustan Unilever Limited (HUL). The original corporate estate was later redeveloped into Brigade Tech Gardens.

== Areas in Brookefield ==
- Aeronautical Engineers Co-Operative Society [AECS] Layout
- AAI
- BEML Layout
- Brookefield Mall [closed down due to renovation by current owners]

== Surrounding area near Brookefield ==
1. Pattandur agrahara
2. Nellurhalli
3. Varthur
4. Whitefield, Bangalore
5. Vinayakanagara (Previously known as Dhanamandi)
6. Hagadur
7. Harohalli
8. Kadugodi(Location of the Sai Baba ashram and the Whitefield railway Station)
9. Kundalahalli
10. Belathur
11. Seegehalli
12. Kannamangala
13. Ramagondanahalli
14. Nagondanahalli
15. Siddapura
16. Channasandra
17. Samethanahalli
18. Bodhanahosahally
19. Thathanur
20. Seetharampalya
21. Sadaramangala
22. Naidu's House
23. Hoodi
24. Vijayanagar
25. Gandhipuram
26. Marathahalli

== Infrastructure ==
Brookefield experienced a boom in residential construction in the latter half of the 1990s, which continued even after the 2000s. A major four-lane road (Varthur Road) connects central Bengaluru city with Brookefield. Brookefield also has extensive BMTC bus and Purple Line (Namma Metro) connectivity. A Traffic and Transit Management Centre (TTMC) in EPIP is functional with schedules connecting it with most areas of the city.

=== BMTC bus route numbers ===
- To Kempegowda Bus Terminus: 333E, 320A, 333K, 333P, 335EP
- To Shivajinagar Bus Stand: 320, 320F, 331, 331C, 331E, 339, 339E
- To K.R.Market: 319A, 320C, 322, 324, 324A, 326C, 326E.
- To Hoskote: 326E, 328B, 328H
- To ITPL - Banashankari: 500CA
- To Silkboard - Kadugodi: 500F

Brookefield gets its water supply from CWSS (Cavery Water Supply Scheme 2012) Stage 4 Phase 2. However many new apartments depend upon ground water and rain water harvesting.
