= Blenheim (Maryland) =

Former estate of the Lee family in Maryland

Coordinates: 38°21′9″N 76°58′20″W

Lee Family Coat of Arms

Blenheim was the estate of the Lee family of Charles County, Maryland. It was owned by Capt. Philip Lee, Sr., Hon., Esq. (1681–1744). Its main house was demolished in the late 19th century.

Philip had been living in Maryland about 14 years when he inherited from his father, Col. Richard Lee II, Esq. (1647–1715), a tract of land at Cedar Point in Maryland called the “Lee’s Purchase” plantation, of Stump Dale, on the Potomac River in Charles County. However, this property was occupied by a tenant with a sole and exclusive contract between 1705 and 1718. It was not until the later date that Philip would gain legal title to the land when the dispute between his father and another claimant to the land was settled by the Provincial Court. The property was only just being developed when Philip died in April 1744; his will was recorded in Charles County on May 1, 1744. At this date there was a one-room-and-loft dwelling which doubled as Philip’s naval office. In addition he had built a bakehouse and mill which he listed in his will. Philip’s home plantation was his Prince George’s County seat, where all of his children were likely born.

After Philip’s death, his son Hon. Richard Lee III “Squire” (1706–1789) purchased half interest in the Lee’s Purchase plantation held by the widow of Col. Thomas Lee, Hon. (1690–1750) and replaced the house that stood during Philip’s lifetime with a larger 1 1/2-story house. Richard lived there until about 1760 when "Lee’s Purchase” was sold and Richard began building his Blenheim plantation house on another tract of land further inland. It was located near the Maryland end of the present Potomac River Bridge. This land was purchased in 1752, which until that date had no prior connection to the Lee family. Blenheim was named after the Battle of Blenheim in 1704. Despite the fact that Philip did not build the Blenheim Plantation, he is still known as the progenitor of the “Blenheim Lees”. From this line three Maryland Governors were produced: Gov. George Plater III, Esq. (1735–1792), Gov., Col. Thomas Sim Lee (1745–1819), and Gov. John Lee Carroll (1830–1911).

It was at one time, the scene of continuous entertainment of travelers between Virginia and the north. It was located on the Potomac River, just below the mouth of Port Tobacco River, to the left of the Maryland entrance of the new Potomac River Bridge, at Morgantown, just south of present-day Newburg. The plantation landing was a port of entry for the North Potomac.

The estate was described as consisting of a square, 2-story brick mansion with a platform and cupola. It had stained glass windows, a winding staircase, and at least one of its lower rooms had a floor tiled with marble and slate. The grounds had a brick stable and coach house, a brick dairy, a brick green house, and a garden walled in with brick. In 1798 the house was accorded the highest valuation of any private residence in Charles County. Blenheim was demolished in the late 19th century.

Blenheim was not supported by a vast plantation but by income-producing investments and inherited lands and wealth. The Lees owned other land in the county, but Blenheim was the principle dwelling plantation being a 225-acre (0.91 km^{2}) tract originally known as “The Three Brothers”. It has been incorrectly identified as that of “Laidler Ferry Farm”, which is located near the present Governor Harry W. Nice Memorial Bridge.

== See also ==
- Colonial families of Maryland
