= William Grafton Delaney Worthington =

American politician

Hon. William Grafton Delaney Worthington IV (1785–1856) was an American lawyer, judge and state Governor, and Secretary of the Territory of East Florida. He was a descendant of the Lee Family of Virginia.

== Early life ==
William was born in 1785, the son of William Worthington (1747–1820) and Sarah Contee (1761–1825). His siblings included: Thomas Contee Worthington (1782–1847), a U.S. Representative from Maryland, Sarah Matilda Worthington (1790–1854) and Walter Brooke Cox Worthington (1795–1845), a member of the Maryland House of Delegates.

Worthington was taken by his parents while very young to their home near Nottingham, when they removed to Prince George's County, Maryland. He was a student at St. John's College in Annapolis, and from there went to Baltimore in 1804, where he read law.

== Career ==
Worthington was admitted to practice before the courts of Baltimore when he was twenty-one. His ability, legal knowledge, and eloquence rapidly brought him into prominence. In 1807 he received the appointment as adjutant on the Governor's staff. In 1809 he was nominated and elected by a large majority to represent Baltimore City in the legislature.

=== Political career ===
After his marriage to Eliza, he inherited a landed estate from his grandfather, Col. Thomas Contee, and removed to Prince George's County. For a number of years he resided in Nottingham, and devoted himself to agriculture. However, this life was not stirring enough for his active mind, and in 1813 he was elected State Senator, for Prince George's County.

In 1815, Worthington was appointed Comptroller of the United States Treasury, to fill an existing vacancy, and for the next two years resided in Georgetown, D.C. In 1817 President James Madison appointed him a special representative of this Government, to Buenos Aires, Santiago de Chile, and Peru. Worthington was also sent as special envoy to Venezuela, being the first U.S. representative to that country. His commission was signed by James Monroe, Secretary of State. In a speech made some thirty years later, Worthington referred to this journey which was made through South America, principally on horseback. He said "I trod the sun-burnt Pampas, and climbed the snow clad peaks of the Andes". In 1821, President James Monroe appointed him Governor and Secretary of the Territory of East Florida, and he resided for two years in St. Augustine, where his eldest son was born.

In 1823, he returned to Baltimore, and was nominated by the Whigs for Congress, but was defeated by the Democratic candidate. The next year he was elected to the legislature, and again the succeeding year. In 1826 he was urged to accept the nomination for Governor, but refused to be a candidate. In 1827, and again in 1828 he was appointed by the Governor, Commissioner for Insolvent Debtors for Baltimore City. In 1830 he was appointed Associate Judge of the Baltimore City Courts, and held that position for several years. After he retired from the bench he went to Spain, and from there to Greece, having in charge some matters entrusted to him by the State Department. He was the recipient of some attention in Athens because of the position he had taken regarding Greek independence when he was in the legislature. After his return from Europe, Judge Worthington resumed his practice of law in Baltimore, until his death in 1856.

== Personal life ==
Worthington married Eliza Chaytor (1794–1834) on 6 Oct 1810, only daughter of Commodore James Chaytor. Together, they had:

- Julia Maria Worthington (1811–1864), who married Col. John Henry Waring (1809–1871), son of Lt. John Waring Jr. (ca. 1767–1815) and Elizabeth Margaret Bowie (1780–1854).
- Eliza Jordan Worthington (d. 1868), who married Dr. Henry Brooke IV (ca. 1805), son of Henry Brooke III (ca. 1765–1825) and Harriet Sophia Brown.
- Dr. Augustine Thomas Contee Worthington (b. 1822), who married Katherine Sara Duval (1824–1910), daughter of James Seriphim Duval Jr. (1802–1833) and Malinda Ellen Rosegrant (1806–1882).
- James Chaytor Worthington (1827–1854), who married Francis "Fannie" Ann Griffith.
- Alexander Contee Worthington Sr. (1825–1904), who married Eveline Isabelle "Eve" Love.
- Henry Worthington

== Ancestry ==
William was the son of William Worthington (1747–1820) and Jane Contee (1761–1825).

Jane was the daughter of Col. Thomas Contee (1729–1811) and Sarah Fendall (1732–1793).

William was the son of Vornel Worthington (1719–1749) and Ann Hammond (1730).

Ann was the daughter of Thomas John Hammond and Anne Cockey (1704).

Vornel was the son of William Worthington Sr. (1694–1770) and Sarah Homewood (1700).

Sarah was the daughter of Capt. James Homewood and Mary Peasley.

William Sr., was the son of Capt. John Worthington (1650–1701) and Sarah Howard (d. 1726), who married 2nd, Capt. John Brice, Gent. (d. 1713).

Sarah was the daughter of Matthew Howard II (ca. 1640–1692) and Sarah Dorsey.

John was the son of Francis Worthington (1624) and Sarah Byron (1625–1664).

Francis was the son of Roger Worthington (1593–1649) and Katherine Haywood (1587–1651).

Roger was the son of Thomas Worthington (1570–1626) and Agnes Gillebrand (1570–1626).

Thomas was the son of Roger Worthington (ca. 1544–1604) and Margaret Brownlowe (ca. 1547–1640).
