= Benjamin Contee =

American politician (1755-1815)

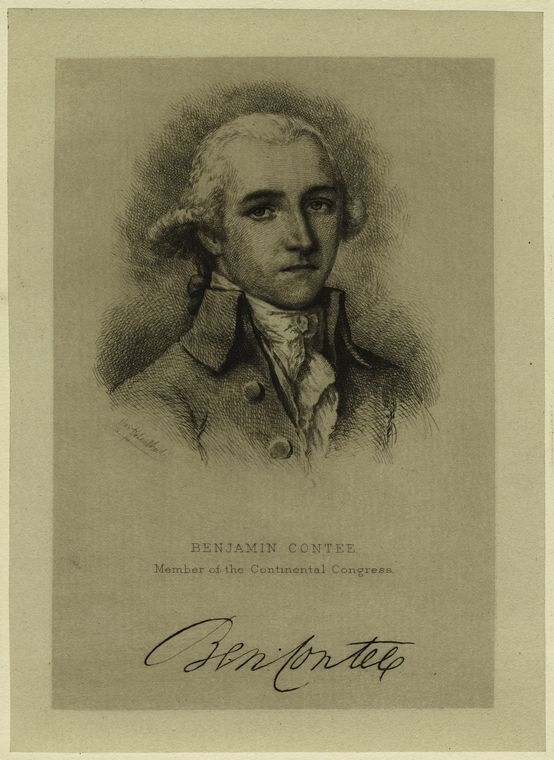
Benjamin Contee

Benjamin Contee (1755 – November 30, 1815) was an American Episcopal priest and statesman from Maryland. He was an officer in the American Revolutionary War, a delegate to the Confederation Congress, and member of the first United States House of Representatives. He was a descendant of the Lee Family of Virginia.

== Early life ==
Contee was the son of Col. Thomas Contee (1729–1811) and Sarah Fendall (1732–1793). He was born at "Brookefield", near Nottingham, Prince George's County, Maryland, the home of his father, and original home of his ancestor, Maj. Thomas Brooke, Sr., Esq. (1632–1676).

== Military and political career ==
At beginning of the Revolutionary War, Contee entered the Continental Army, rising to the rank of captain of the 3rd Maryland Regiment, which proved to be one of the army's elite units until its near annihilation at the Battle of Camden.

After the war he was elected to the Maryland House of Delegates, where he served from 1785 to 1787. He served as a delegate to the Confederation Congress from 1787 to 1788, and the third district of Maryland in the U.S. Congress from 1789 to 1791. Along with his brother Alexander Contee (1752–1810), he became a merchant of London, at their stores in Nottingham, Queen Anne and Upper Marlboro. He was declared insolvent due to "mishaps in trade". After having served in Congress, he went to Europe and traveled through Spain, France, and England.

== Marriage and children ==
On April 8, 1788, he married his cousin, Sarah Russell Lee (1766–1810). Sarah was born at "Blenheim" in 1766, and died December 6, 1810, at "Bromont", near Newburg, Charles Co., Maryland. Sarah was the daughter of Philip Thomas Lee (1736–1778) and Ann Russell (died 1777) of England. The Contees' children were Sarah "Sallie" Elinor Contee (1789 – c. 1815), Philip Ashton Lee Contee, Sr. (1795–1842), Edmund Henry Contee (1799–1832), and Alice Lee Contee (1803–1868), who married Gov. Joseph Kent.

== Episcopal minister ==
On his return to America he completed his study in theology and was admitted to holy orders in 1803 by Rev. Thomas John Claggett, Bishop of Maryland, a neighbor, friend, helper and patriot of the Revolution. That same year he became rector of William & Mary's, Charles County. He was a distinguished minister of the Episcopal Church and for several years the incumbent of Port Tobacco Parish, Charles County, Maryland. He was a native of Prince George's County and brought up in the church. In 1808, he added Trinity, and in 1811, St. Paul's, Prince George's Co., Maryland, to his charge. He continued as a Judge of the Orphan's Court, and was always in the Standing Committee.

== Property ==
Benjamin resided briefly in the mid-1790s at "Blenheim". At the time of his death he was living at the glebe house of Trinity Parish near Allen's Fresh. Benjamin and his wife were more than likely interred in the Contee cemetery at "Locust Hill" just outside Port Tobacco, which has been destroyed. If not there, then they were buried in the original Christ Church cemetery in Port Tobacco, which is now covered by swamp.

U.S. House of Representatives
Preceded by no one	U.S. Congressman, Maryland's 3rd District; 1789—1791	Succeeded by William Pinkney
