= Thomas Contee =

American politician (1729–1811)

Personal details
- Born: c. 1729 Nottingham, Prince George's County, Province of Maryland
- Died: 1811 (aged 81–82)
- Spouse: Sarah Fendall (m. 1751)
- Children: 4, including Benjamin Contee
- Relatives: Thomas Brooke Jr. (grandfather); Thomas Brooke Sr. (great-grandfather)
- Military career
- Rank: Colonel
- Conflicts: American Revolutionary War

Thomas Contee (c. 1729–1811) of "Brookefield", near Nottingham, Prince George's County, Maryland, was an American patriot who held the rank of colonel, militia man, politician, planter.

== Early life ==
Thomas Contee was born at "Brookefield" in Prince George's County, Maryland around 1729 to Alexander Contee (1693–1740) and Jane Brooke (1702–1779).

== Family ==
Contee married Sarah Fendall (1732–1793) in 1751 in Charles County, Maryland. They resided at "Brookefield", which is now called "The Valley", near Nottingham, Prince George's Co., Maryland.

Sarah (Fendall) Contee (1732–1793), was the daughter of Benjamin Fendall I, Esq. (1708–1764) and first wife, Eleanor Lee (1710–1759), a member of the Lee Family of Virginia. Sarah was born February 7, 1732, at "Potomoe", Charles County., Maryland. Sarah was described as a very beautiful woman with a wealth of golden hair; Contee left a portrait which reveals a mild, handsome face, powdered hair, ruffled shirt and stock.

Contee inherited through his mother, the estate "Brookefield", the original home of his ancestor, Maj. Thomas Brooke, Sr., Esq. (1632–1676). Contee was a merchant by 1764, and was an attorney in fact for William Molleson, of London, England in 1766. He was engaged in a tobacco trade business with Capt. Fielder Bowie (ca. 1745–1794), which imported large quantities of goods until the firm disbanded in 1775. Contee had management of a store at Pig Point in Bristol in southern Anne Arundel County from 1772 to 1775, and was an agent for his sons Alexander and Benjamin, in Nottingham, and Upper Marlboro.

=== Children ===
1. Alexander Contee (1752–1810), who never married.
2. Capt. Benjamin Contee, Rev., Hon. (1755–1815), who married Sarah Russell Lee (1766–1810), daughter of Philip Thomas Lee (1736–1778) and Ann Russell (d. 1777).
3. Eleanor Lee Contee (1758–1786), who married Dr. Michael Wallace, Jr., Esq. (1749–1794).
4. Jane Contee (1761–1825), who married William Worthington (1747–1820).
5. Sarah Contee (1767–1844), who married David Slater (ca. 1763).

== Revolutionary War ==
During the Revolutionary period he took a conspicuous position. He was chairman of various meetings of the citizens in Marlboro, was member of the House of Burgesses (Maryland), a delegate to the first convention held at Annapolis in 1770, and was one of the signers of the Declaration of Association of Freeman of Maryland in 1775. In September of the same year he was elected to the Committee of Observation. Too old for active duty, Contee in 1776 was commissioned a Major of Militia by the Council of Safety and instructed to inspect the newly raised troops and to aid in the equipment of the volunteer forces. In November 1776, he was elected a member of the Council of Safety which continued to act until March 20, 1777, when the new state government was organized. He was sent to Philadelphia to confer with the Continental Congress as to the proper organization of the army and the general plans for defense. Contee also served as Chairman of the Patuxent Associators.

== Public service ==
Contee was elected to the state legislature and for many years was chairman of the Republican Party in Prince George's County. Contee was a vestryman for St. Pauls's Parish, Prince George's County. In 1811, at the time of his death, Contee had amassed 1,082 acres (4 km^{2}) in Prince George's, Baltimore, and Frederick counties, 4 lots in Prince George's and Montgomery counties, plus 4,833 acres (20 km^{2}) in Kentucky. His estate was valued at $9,167.75, including 19 slaves, books, and silver.

A picture of Col. Contee shows a mild, handsome face and powdered hair. According to the 1790 census, Contee owned 25 slaves.

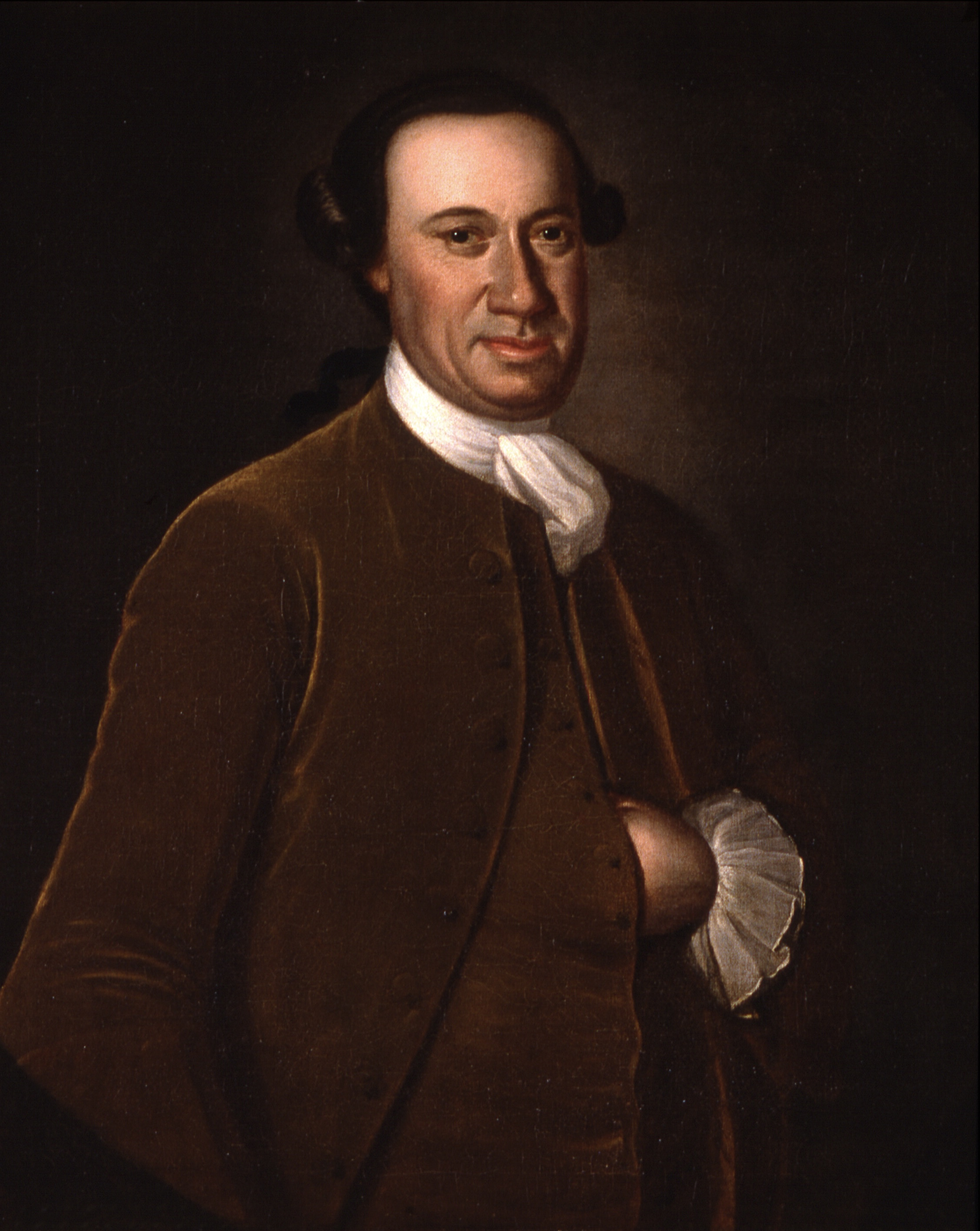
A portrait of John Hanson by John Hesselius, around 1765 to 1770.

Contee' older sister Jane Hanson, married John Hanson (1721–1783), of "Mulberry Grove", who some say was the first President of the United States. On November 5, 1781, he was elected by a large majority, President of the Congress and in 1782, as head of the new nation, issued letters of marque to prey upon the British Commerce. These commissions were signed "John Hanson, President"; from which fact he is spoken of as the first President of the United States.

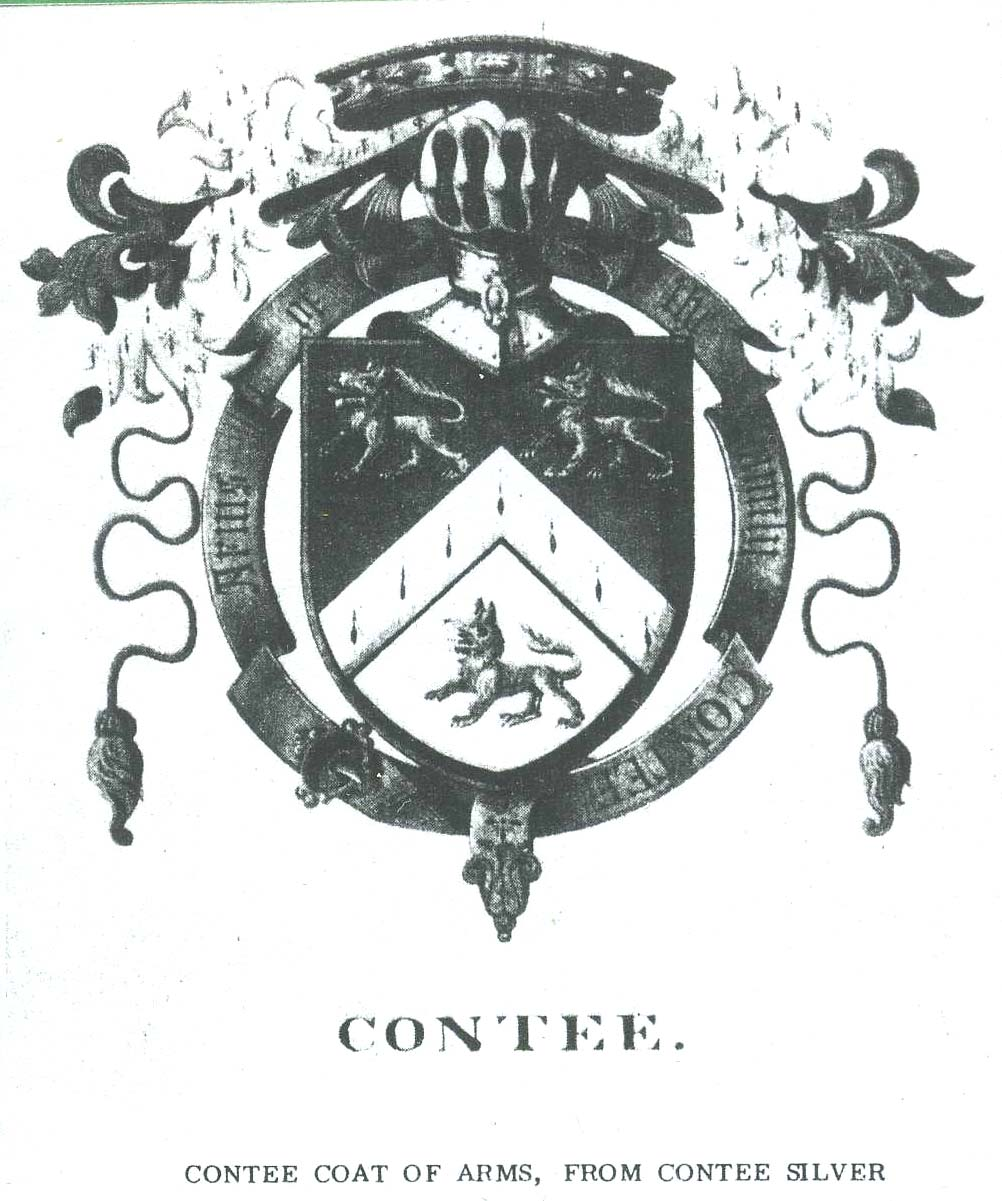
Contee Family Coat of Arms

== Ancestry ==
His mother was the daughter of Col. Thomas Brooke, Jr., Hon. (1660–1730) of "Brookefield", President of Maryland and his second wife, Barbara Dent (1676–1754). Col. Thomas Brooke, Jr., was the son of Maj. Thomas Brooke, Sr., Esq. (1632–1676), of "Brookefield", and Eleanor (Hatton) Darnall (1642–1745), who married secondly Col. Henry Darnall, Sr. (1645–1711).

His father was the son of Dr. Peter Contee (d. 1714), of Barnstaple, Devonshire, England, and his first wife Catherine. Peter immigrated in about 1703 and resided in Charles County, before taking up permanent residence in Prince George's County. Peter was a surgeon, and married secondly, Francis (?) Hopkins. Francis was the widow of Capt. William Hopkins (d. 1702).

Peter Contee was the son of Adolphe de Conti and his wife Grace. Adolphe was a Huguenot who immigrated to England from France during the reign of Louis XIII, King of France (1601–1643). The motto under his Arms in Guild Hall, London is, "pour dieu et mon roi" ("for God and my king").

His father was born in April 1693, in Barnstaple, Devonshire, England. He immigrated around 1703, and resided in Charles County about 1720. He joined his uncle, Col. John Contee (d. 1708), who though married twice, had no children, and whose will provided liberally for Alexander. Alexander was a prosperous merchant at Nottingham Prince George's Co., Clerk of the Court; and from 1720 to 1724, member of the Lower House of the General Assembly. He was a vestryman of St. Paul's Parish. He married about 1720, Jane Brooke. Jane inherited a portion of "Brookefield", her father's estate. "Brookefield", also known as "The Valley", and was located near Nottingham in Prince George's County. At the time of his death on December 24, 1740, Alexander had amassed at least 2,598 acres (11 km^{2}) of land, and his estate was valued at 1,613.2.11 pounds sterling, plus 3,827.19.8 pounds current money. This included 32 slaves, 2 servants, books, and clerk's writing equipment. Alexander's will contained a heraldic shield only, with a chevron on which are charges and beasts in dexter, middle and sinister chief and middle base. The arms of the Conte of Montulle, Normandy, contain a chevron and three mullets described as "Azure chevron or between three mullets or".

The Contees came to Maryland from England, but they were of French descent Huguenots, who emigrated to Barnstable, in Devonshire, to escape the religious persecutions which culminated in the revocation of the Edict of Nantes. The name originally de Conti, appears among the French nobility from a very early date. As far back as 1375, Isabella, dame de Conti, married Colard de Mailly. Their great granddaughter married in 1551, Louis I, Prince de Conde, a cadet of the Bourbons who ascended the French throne in the person of Henry IV, King of France and Navare (1553–1610). The second son of this latter marriage, Francois de Bourbon, was Prince de Conti, but had no issue and the title was revived from Armand de Bourbon, a cadet of the great Conde but expired for lack of male issue. The Vicomte de Conti arms are identical with those of the Rochelle family and also with those of the Marquis de Graviers, Comte de Noirant (of Normandy) and Baron de Conti (of Orange).

== See also ==
- Colonial families of Maryland
