= Nicholas Greenberry =

4th Royal Governor of Maryland, died 1697

4th Royal Governor of Maryland
- In office 1693–1694
- Preceded by: Edmund Andros
- Succeeded by: Edmund Andros

Personal details
- Born: c. 1627 England
- Died: December 17, 1697 (aged 69–70) Annapolis, Maryland
- Spouse: Anne
- Children: 6
- Profession: governor and Commander of the Military Forces of several counties of Maryland.

Colonel Nicholas Greenberry (circa 1627 – December 17, 1697) was the 4th Royal Governor of Maryland, and Commander of the Military Forces of Anne Arundel and Baltimore Counties.

== Early life and family ==
Nicholas Greenberry was born in about 1627 to unknown parents. One possibility proposed by Charles Francis Stein, who studied the seal that Nicholas Greenberry used:

I made a careful examination of the seal impressions left by Nicholas Greenberry and his son. The shield, having a bend with three lozenges (diamond shapes) can be seen without much difficulty, and the crest above the knight's helmet, seemingly a horned animal's head in profile, was most evidently a unicorn. "Pursuing the matter further, I discovered that there was one family arms listed as having the combination of a band with three lozenges on the shield with a unicorn's head for the crest. This is the English family of CARRINGTON, a family of ancient noble descent. According to Burke, the chief line of the Barons of Carrington became extinct in the time of Queen Elizabeth. Colonel Nicholas Greenberry was born a generation later, in 1627. It would seem probable that he was closely related to the Carringtons. Could it be that his mother was a Carrington and his father perhaps a member of the royal family?

There is also a Nicholas Greenberry who was baptised in 1640 at Irnham, South Kesteven, Lincolnshire, England. This Nicholas was the son of Nicholas and Catherine Greeneberrie née Hawkins of Irnham, Lincolnshire, England.

A Nicholas Greenberry also shows up in the state papers of Charles II:

In June 15(?), 1667 a note by Walter Cowdry, keeper of Newgate, of seven prisoners, ordered to be transported by their own consent, and of Nich. Greenberry, left to Lord Chief Justice Kelynge. In June 1667 was the Petition of Nicholas Greenberry to the King, for reprieve or release from prison; is committed for want of sureties, on suspicion only of burglary, yet is to be tried for his life at the assizes, at Brentwood, Essex. Desires to serve under Lord Belasye at Tangiers, or elsewhere beyond seas. Annexes, 93. I. Declaration by John Shadwell, clerk of Newgate, that Greenberry was committed August 31, 1666, for want of security, and afterwards impeached before Lord Chief Justice Kelynge for breaking into a dwelling house.

Sometime between 1666 and 1671, Nicholas Greenberry married Anne (surname unknown). Nicholas and Anne Greenberry had at least four children, two born in England: Charles, born in 1672 at Holburn, London, Middlesex, England and Katherine, born in 1674 at Holburn, London, Middlesex, England, and two born in Maryland: Anne, born in 1676 and Elizabeth, born in 1678. English burial records show two children of a Nicholas Greenberry were buried in England between 1667 and 1671: Anne, buried 6 Aug 1667 at St Giles, Goudhurst, Kent, England, and Elizabeth, buried 19 Mar 1671 at Hoborn, London, Middlesex, England.

Nicholas Greenberry arrived at Patuxent, in the Maryland Colony, aboard the sailing ship Constant Friendship in 1674. He was accompanied by his wife, two children (Charles and Katherine), and three servants. On 9 July 1674, Capt. William Wheatly, master, claimed rights due for transportation of 43 passengers on board, including "Mr Greenberry his wife & two Children."

== Land ownership ==
According to Maryland Land Warrants, Annapolis Land Office, Liber 15, folio 837, Greenberry was granted a warrant for 350 acres (1.4 km^{2}) of land located in "Providence" (now Annapolis) on July 29, 1674.

Later, in 1680, Nicholas bought another tract of land near "Providence" called "Fuller" from Colonel William Fuller. This land was resurveyed and renamed "Greenberry Forest." Greenberry called the home "Whitehall," a name it retains to this day. In later years, this home became the residence of Horatio Sharpe, governor of the Maryland Colony. Sharpe had a Georgian mansion built on the site.

In 1685, Colonel Nicholas Greenberry bought 250 acres (1 km^{2}) of land called "Towne Neck." This is located at the mouth of the Severn River and became known as "Greenberry Point." The colony's Deputy Governor, Governor Notley, was forced from office for hanging two Protestants for rebellion against authority. He was replaced by a committee of twenty citizens. Greenberry was one of the gentlemen justices chosen as a member of that committee.

== Revolt ==
On July 27, 1689, the Protestant Association, under John Coode, seized St. Marys, the capital of the colony, in a revolt against the proprietary government. This same year, Nicholas was captain of foot in the Anne Arundel County Militia. He was promoted to major in 1690. He then quickly received a commission of colonel, and was appointed commander of the Military Forces of Anne Arundel and Baltimore Counties.

The proprietaryship was disallowed on June 27, 1691. Sir Lionel Copley took the office as governor, and quickly appointed Greenberry as a member of the council. Copley died in September 1693, at which time Greenberry was appointed by Sir Edmund Andros, Governor of Virginia, as president of the Council, acting governor of Maryland, and Keeper of the Great Seal of Maryland. Greenberry served in this capacity until he was replaced on July 26, 1694, by Francis Nicholson by a commission from the King dated in February 1694.

== High court appointment ==
On 2 March 1695, Nicholas Greenberry was on the high Court of Chancery of Maryland. Here is the way it reads verbatim:

William ye third by ye grace of God of England, Holland, France, and Ireland, King Defender of ye faith &c to Coll. Nicholas Greenberry, Kneln Chesteldyne and Ma'r Edw. Dorsey, Esqrs. Greeting.

Whereas by a late commission granted by us and our Royal Consort Mary lately deed dated ye 14th day of last Coll. Henry Jowles, Esq. was instituted Chiefs Judge in Chancery & Keeper of our Great Seal of Maryland & Kenelm Chrseldyne & M'jr Edwd. Dorsey, Esqs joynt Commissioners & Assistant Judges in our high Court of Chancery for ye sd province and whereas ye said Coll. Henr. Jowles, Esq. being at present afflicted with ye Gout & other indispositions of body is therefore unable to attend ye said Court of Chancery and ye causes in our said Court require a dispatch & cannot without public prejudice be delayed, KNOW YET WE have therefore assigned you ye sd. COLL. NICHO. GREENBURY.

Kenelm Chesldyne and Ma'r Edwd. Dorsey, Esqs. Commissioners & Judges of our high Court of Chancery in our sd province of Maryland until such time as ye above said Coll. Henr. Jowles (together with ye assistant Judges joynt in ye said Commission with him) shall be able to attend his said office and to keep the cause to be kept all ordinances, rules &c. March 2, 1695.

== Death ==
Nicholas Greenberry died at the age of 70 on December 17, 1697, at Whitehall. His wife Anne died April 27, 1698, at the age of 50. Greenberry and his wife were buried at their estate, Greenberry Point Farm. In 1925, the pair were disinterred and reburied at St. Anne's Episcopal Church Cemetery, Annapolis, Maryland.

The inscription on Nicholas' tombstone reads:

Here Lyeth Interred The Body Of Col Nicholas Greenberry Esq Who Departed This Life The 17th Day Of December 1697 Aetatis Suae 70

Nicholas Greenberry's will mentions his wife Ann and his four children, Charles, Katherine, Anne, and Elizabeth.

Political offices
Preceded by Lionel Copley	Proprietary Governor of Maryland; 1693–1694	Succeeded by Francis Nicholson
