= Governor Blakiston =

Governor Blakiston may refer to:

- Nathaniel Blakiston (1722 deaths), 8th Royal Governor of Maryland from 1698 to 1702
- Nehemiah Blakiston (fl. 1690s), 2nd Governor of the Maryland colony from 1691 to 1692
