= Governor Seymour =

Governor Seymour may refer to:

- Frederick Seymour (1820–1869), Governor of Crown Colony of British Columbia from 1864 to 1866 and Governor of the United Colonies of Vancouver Island and British Columbia from 1866 to 1869
- Horatio Seymour (1810–1886), 18th Governor of New York
- John Seymour (Maryland governor) (1649–1709), 10th Royal Governor of Maryland from 1704 to 1709
- Thomas H. Seymour (1807–1868), 36th Governor of Connecticut
