= Governor Lloyd =

Governor Lloyd may refer to:

- Edward Lloyd (Governor of Maryland) (1779–1834), 13th Governor of Maryland from 1819 to 1826
- Edward Lloyd II (1670–1718), 11th Royal Governor of Maryland from 1709 to 1714
- George Lloyd, 1st Baron Lloyd (1879–1941), Governor of Bombay from 1918 to 1923
- Henry Lloyd (governor) (1852–1920), 40th Governor of Maryland
