= List of colonial governors of Maryland =

The Province of Maryland began as a proprietary colony of the Catholic Calvert family, the Lords Baltimore under a royal charter, and its first eight governors were appointed by them. When the Catholic King of England, James II, was overthrown in the Glorious Revolution, the Calverts lost their charter and Maryland became a royal colony. It was governed briefly by local Protestants before the arrival of the first of 12 governors appointed directly by the English crown. The royal charter was restored to the Calverts in 1715 and governors were again appointed by the Calverts until the American Revolution.

== Colonial period ==
This list includes appointed governors, including those briefly appointed by the Cromwellian government, but excludes those who claimed themselves as governors of the colony without a formal appointment from London.

Number	Name	Picture	Took office	Left office
Proprietary governors
1	Leonard Calvert	LCalvert	1634	1647
2	Thomas Greene		1647	1649
3	William Stone	Stone	1649	March 28, 1652
4	Rev. Robert Brook Sr.		March 29, 1652	July 3, 1652
5	William Stone	Stone	July 4, 1652	1656
6	Lieutenant-General Josias Fendall		1657	1660
7	Phillip Calvert		1660	1660
8	Charles Calvert, 3rd Baron Baltimore	CCalvert	1661	1676
9	Jesse Wharton		1676	1676
10	Thomas Notley		1676	1679
11	Charles Calvert, 3rd Baron Baltimore	CCalvert	1679	1684
12	Benedict Calvert, 4th Baron Baltimore		1684	1688
13	William Joseph		1688	1689
Leaders of the Protestant associators
1	John Coode		1689	1690
2	Nehemiah Blakiston		1691	1692
Royal governors
1	Sir Lionel Copley		1692	1693
2	Sir Thomas Lawrence		1693	1694
3	Sir Edmund Andros	Andros	1693	1693
4	Colonel Nicholas Greenberry		1693	1694
5	Sir Edmund Andros	Andros	1694	1694
6	Sir Thomas Lawrence		1694	1694
7	Francis Nicholson		1694	1699
8	Colonel Nathaniel Blakiston		1699	1702
9	Thomas Tench		1702	1704
10	Colonel John Seymour		1704	1709
11	Major General Edward Lloyd		1709	1714
12	John Hart		1714	1715
Governors of the restored proprietary government
1	John Hart		1715	1720
2	Colonel Thomas Brooke, Jr.		1720	1720
3	Captain Charles Calvert		1720	1727
4	Benedict Leonard Calvert		1727	1731
5	Samuel Ogle	SamOgle	1731	1732
6	Charles Calvert, 5th Baron Baltimore	CCalvert5	1732	1733
7	Samuel Ogle	SamOgle	1733	1742
8	Sir Thomas Bladen		1742	1746/47
9	Samuel Ogle	SamOgle	1746/47	1752
10	Benjamin Tasker		1752	1753
11	Horatio Sharpe	Sharpe	1753	1769
12	Sir Robert Eden, 1st Baronet, of Maryland	Eden	1769	1776

== See also ==
- List of governors of Maryland
