= Jesse Wharton (Maryland governor) =

American politician (died 1676)

7th Proprietary Governor of Maryland
- In office June 16, 1676 – July 27, 1676
- Preceded by: Charles Calvert
- Succeeded by: Thomas Notley

Jesse Wharton (died 1676) was the 7th Proprietary Governor of Maryland during a brief period in 1676. He was appointed by the royally chartered proprietor of Maryland, Charles Calvert, 3rd Baron Baltimore. Following his death, Wharton was briefly succeeded by Cecil Calvert, infant son of Charles Calvert, before the next Governor, Thomas Notley, was appointed.

== Life ==
Wharton emigrated to Maryland from the English colony in Barbados in 1670. He quickly became a successful planter and politician in the colony, holding several political offices and amassing 11 slaves and more than 3,000 acres (1,200 ha) before his death only six years after his arrival. Once in the colony, Wharton married Elizabeth Sewall, the daughter of a politically prominent local settler named Henry Sewall. Wharton became a member of the Governor's Council in 1672 and became the Deputy Governor in 1676, with de facto gubernatorial authority, for a brief period before his death. At the time, the nominal Governor of the colony was Cecil Calvert, the infant son of the colony's proprietor. In reality, the Governor's Council led by Wharton ruled the colony, and he is listed by the Maryland State Archives as having been a colonial governor. Wharton's appointment passed over four more senior members of the council, including Philip Calvert.

The appointment came at a dangerous time for the colony, when threats from both within and outside its settlers loomed. Settlers on the western shore feared an attack from hostile Native Americans, and earlier that year the colony had armed some friendly tribes in preparation for just such an eventuality. Next door in Virginia, Bacon's Rebellion threatened the colonial order itself. These twin crises reached a peak in July, when the rebellion in Virginia succeeded in toppling its colonial government and settlers on the western shore were warned to arm themselves against an imminent native attack. In the midst of this crisis, and only a little more than a month after assuming office, Wharton died. He had only governed the colony from Charles Calvert's departure on June 16, 1676, until he named Thomas Notley as his successor just prior to his death in July of the same year. Upon his death, he left behind one son, Henry Wharton, and his wife, Elizabeth. She later remarried a man named William Digges.
