= Thomas Notley =

Colonial governor of Maryland (1632–1679)

Thomas Notley (Cerne Abbas, Dorset, England 1632 - 3 April 1679) was the 8th Proprietary Governor of Maryland from 1676 through 1679. Having first moved to Barbados he immigrated to America in 1662. He was the speaker of the legislature in 1666. He and fellow Barbadian immigrant Jesse Wharton passed slave codes similar to those in Barbados that punished those who helped in the escape of a slave or who stole and kept another planter’s slave for themselves.

In 1663, Notley purchased a 500 acre tenancy from Thomas Gerrard on St. Clement's manor, followed by an additional 1800 acres from Duddington Manor and adjoining tracts. These were eventually combined into the single holding Cerne Abbas Manor, where Notley Hall was built, now near Maddox, Maryland.

He was appointed to succeed Wharton by the colony's proprietor, Charles Calvert, 3rd Baron Baltimore. Calvert arrived in the colony in January 1678 or 1679, but appears to have allowed Notley to retain his title until Notley's death in April, 1679, when Calvert assumed the mantle of governor himself.

His personal wealth at the time of his death included 29 slaves, 7 servants, and more than 3750 acres of land. Some sources report that Notley had no heirs and never married, whereas another reports that his daughter married Benjamin Rozier (also spelt Rozer). Notley Hall was left to Charles Calvert and Benjamin Rozier, and became the possession of the Rozier family, likely from Benjamin Rozier's son, Notley Rozier, sometime after. Other sources report that Notley Rozier was Thomas Notley's godson, without explicitly stating a biological relation.

Notley seems to have been popular as a large number of individuals were christened with Notley as a given name. In his will, written four years before his death, he listed at least five beneficiaries with the name Notley: Notley Maddox, Notlea Goldsmith (daughter of John Goldsmith), Notley Warren, a Thomas Notley Goldsmith, and Notley Rozier.

Notley was originally a Catholic, and later converted to Protestantism in the early 1670s.

== See also ==
- List of colonial governors of Maryland
