= Edmund Andros =

English soldier and colonial governor

Sir Edmund Andros
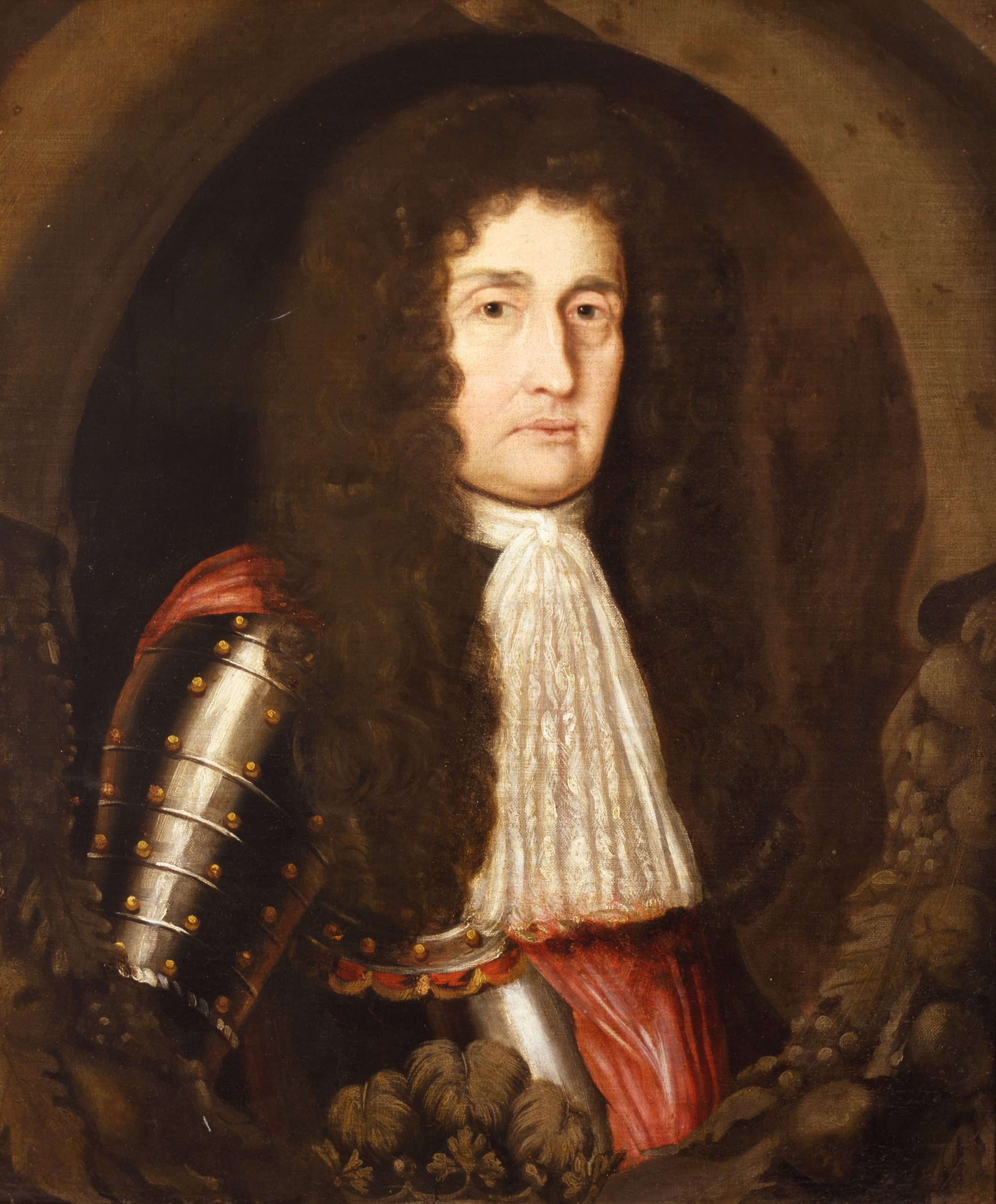
- Portrait by Mary Beale

4th Governor of New York
- In office 9 February 1674 – 18 April 1683
- Monarch: Charles II
- Preceded by: Anthony Colve
- Succeeded by: Thomas Dongan

Bailiff of Guernsey
- In office 1674–1713
- Preceded by: Amias Andros
- Succeeded by: Jean de Sausmarez

Governor of the Dominion of New England (Governor-in-chief of New England)
- In office 20 December 1686 – 18 April 1689
- Preceded by: Joseph Dudley
- Succeeded by: None (dominion dissolved) (partly Simon Bradstreet as Governor of the Massachusetts Bay Colony)

Colonial Governor of Virginia
- In office September 1692 – May 1698
- Preceded by: Lord Effingham
- Succeeded by: Francis Nicholson

3rd and 5th Royal Governor of Maryland
- In office September 1693 – May 1694
- Preceded by: Sir Thomas Lawrence
- Succeeded by: Nicholas Greenberry
- In office 1694–1694
- Preceded by: Nicholas Greenberry
- Succeeded by: Sir Thomas Lawrence

Personal details
- Born: 6 December 1637 London, England
- Died: 24 February 1714 (aged 76) London, England
- Resting place: St Anne's Church, Soho, London

Sir Edmund Andros (6 December 1637 – 24 February 1714; also spelled Edmond) was an English army officer and colonial administrator. He was the governor of the Dominion of New England during most of its three-year existence. At other times, Andros served as governor of the provinces of New York, East and West Jersey, Virginia, and Maryland.

Before and while serving in North America, he served as Bailiff of Guernsey. His tenure in New England was authoritarian and turbulent, as his views were decidedly pro-Anglican, a negative quality in a region home to many Puritans. His actions in New England resulted in his overthrow during the 1689 Boston revolt. He became governor of Virginia three years later.

Andros was considered a more effective governor in New York and Virginia. However, he became the enemy of prominent figures in both colonies, many of whom worked to remove him from office. Despite these enmities, he managed to negotiate several treaties of the Covenant Chain with the Haudenosaunee, establishing a long-lived peace involving the colonies and other tribes that interacted with that confederacy. His actions and governance generally followed his instructions upon appointment to office, and he received approbation from the monarchs and governments that appointed him.

Andros was recalled to England from Virginia in 1698 and resumed the title of Bailiff of Guernsey. Although he no longer resided entirely on Guernsey, he was appointed lieutenant governor of the island and served in this position for four years. Andros died in 1714.

== Early life ==
Coat of Arms of Edmund Andros

Andros was born in London on 6 December 1637. Amice Andros, his father, was Bailiff of Guernsey and a staunch supporter of Charles I. His mother was Elizabeth Stone, whose sister was a courtier to the king's sister, Queen Elizabeth of Bohemia. Although it has been claimed that Andros was present at the surrender in 1651 of Guernsey's Castle Cornet, the last royalist stronghold to surrender in the English Civil War, there is no firm evidence to support this. It is possible that he fled Guernsey with his mother in 1645.

In 1656, he was apprenticed to his uncle, Sir Robert Stone, captain of a cavalry company. Andros then served in two winter campaigns in Denmark, including the relief of Copenhagen in 1659. As a result of these experiences he gained fluency in French, Swedish, and Dutch. He remained a firm supporter of the Stuarts while they were in exile. Charles II, after his restoration to the throne, specifically commended the Andros family for its support.

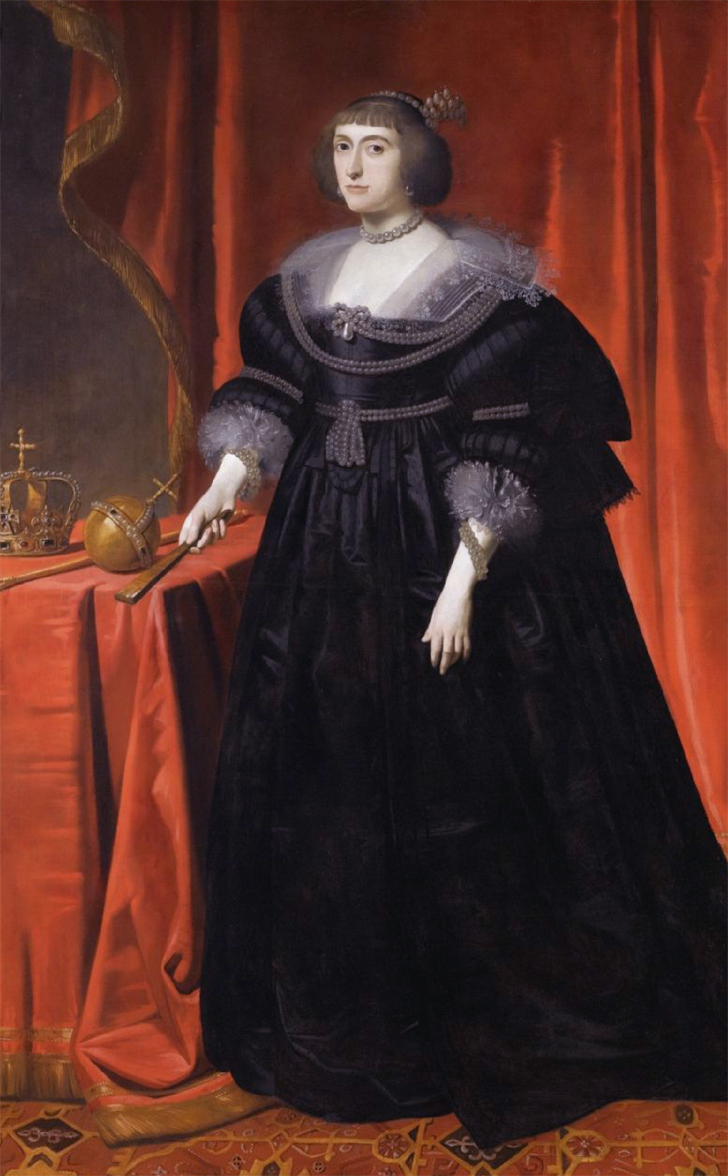
Elizabeth Stuart, Queen of Bohemia, sister of Charles I of England and aunt of Charles II

Andros served as a courtier to Elizabeth of Bohemia from 1660 until she died in 1662. During the 1660s he served in the English army against the Dutch. He was next commissioned a major in the regiment of Sir Tobias Bridge, which was sent to Barbados in 1666. He returned to England two years later, carrying despatches and letters. In 1671, he married Mary Craven, the daughter of Thomas Craven of Burnsall in the West Riding of Yorkshire (now North Yorkshire), the son of a cousin to the Earl of Craven, one of the queen's closest advisors, and a friend who served as his patron for many years. In 1672 he was commissioned major.

== Governor of New York ==
After his father died in 1674, Edmund Andros acquired Sausmarez Manor which added to his family's already substantial landholdings in Guernsey that included the fief of Anneville (from 1659) and several other fiefs. He was then appointed as the Bailiff of Guernsey, succeeding his father. This appointment was for life and came with the authority to appoint a lieutenant bailiff, a position he filled with his uncle, Charles Andros, seigneur of the fief d'Anneville. This allowed Edmund Andros to travel to America. He was appointed by James, Duke of York, to be the first Proprietary Governor of the Province of New York. The province's territory included the former territories of New Netherland, ceded to England by the Treaty of Westminster, including all of present-day New Jersey, the Dutch holdings on the Hudson River from New Amsterdam (renamed New York City) to Albany, as well as Long Island, Martha's Vineyard, and Nantucket.

In 1664, Charles II granted James all of this territory, as well as all of the land in present-day Maine between the Kennebec and St. Croix Rivers, but with the intervening Dutch retaking of the territory, Charles issued a new patent to James. Andros arrived in New York harbor in late October and negotiated the handover of the Dutch territories with local representatives and Dutch Governor Anthony Colve, which took place on 10 November 1674. Andros agreed to confirm the existing property holdings and allow the territory's Dutch inhabitants to maintain their Protestant religion.

=== Connecticut boundary dispute ===
Andros was also involved in boundary disputes with the neighboring Connecticut Colony. Dutch claims had initially extended as far east as the Connecticut River, but these claims had been ceded in the 1650 Treaty of Hartford and reduced to a boundary line 20 miles (32 km) east of the Hudson in 1664. York's territorial claim did not acknowledge these, and Andros announced to Connecticut authorities his intentions to reclaim that territory (which included Connecticut's capital, Hartford) in early 1675. Connecticut leaders pointed out the later revisions to Connecticut's boundaries, but Andros pressed his claim, arguing that York's grant had superseded those revisions. Andros used the outbreak of King Philip's War in July 1675 as an excuse to go by ship to Connecticut with a small military force to establish the duke's claim. When he arrived at Saybrook at the mouth of the river on 8 July, he found the fort there occupied by Connecticut militia, who were flying the English flag. Andros came ashore, had a brief conversation with the fort commander, read his commission, and returned to New York City. This was the full extent of Andros's attempt to claim the territory, but it would be remembered in Connecticut when later attempts were made to assert New York authority.

=== King Philip's War ===
Following his Connecticut expedition, Andros traveled into Haudenosaunee country to establish relations. He was well received and agreed to continue the Dutch practice of supplying firearms to the Haudenosaunee. This action successfully blunted French diplomatic successes with the Haudenosaunee. It also led to charges in New England that Andros provided arms to Indians allied to King Philip (as the Wampanoag leader Metacom was known to the English); in fact, Andros provided gunpowder to Rhode Island that was used in the Great Swamp Fight against the Narragansetts in December 1675, and specifically outlawed the sale of munitions to tribes known to be allied to Philip. The charges poisoned the atmosphere between Andros and Massachusetts leaders, even though Andros's conduct met with approval in London.

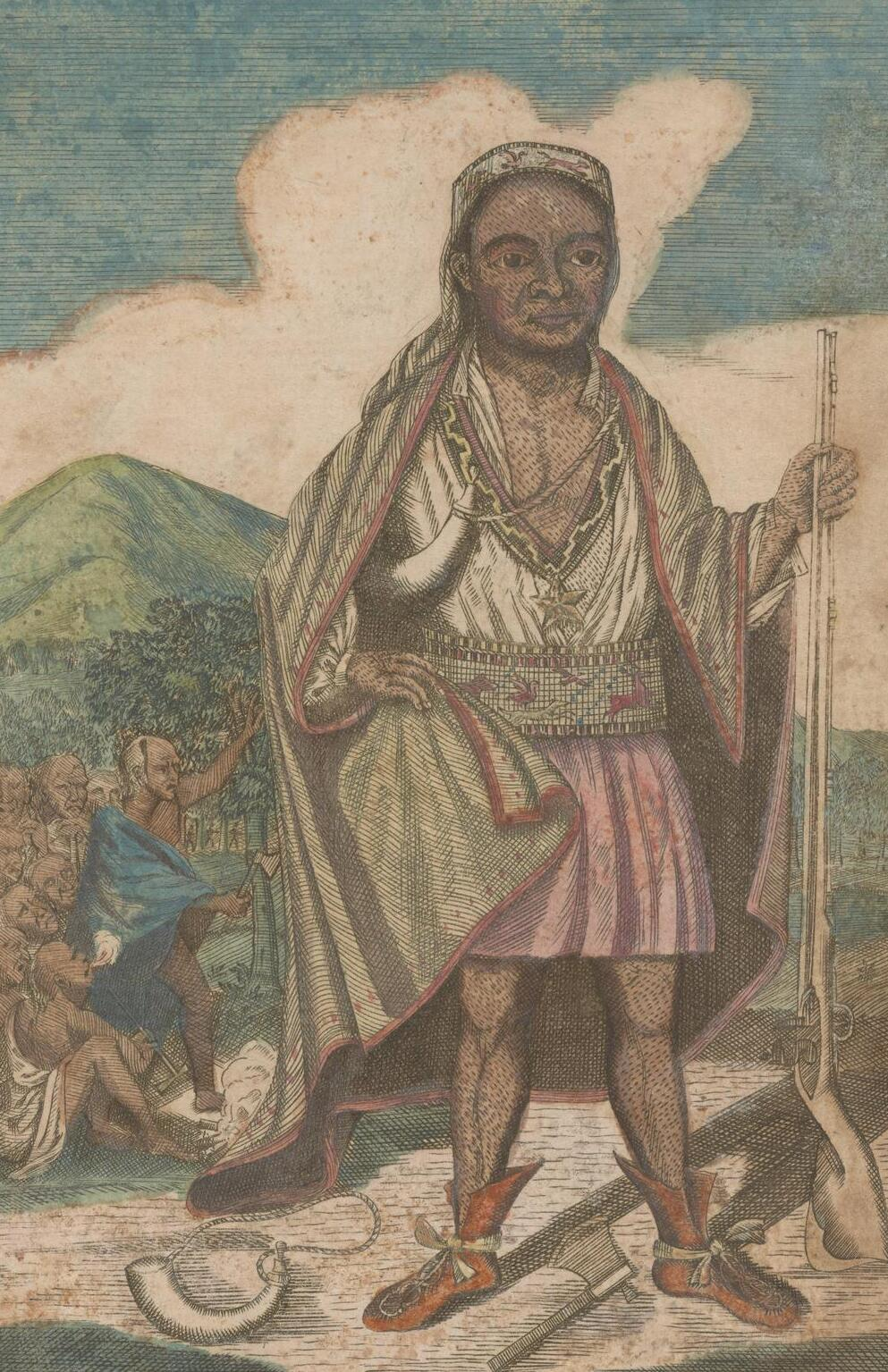
A caricature of Metacomet drawn by Paul Revere

In the meeting with the Haudenosaunee, Andros was given the name Corlaer, a name historically used by the Haudenosaunee to refer to the Dutch governor in New Netherland and continued when the English took over the colony and renamed it New York (in the same way the French governor was dubbed Onontio). One other consequence was the establishment at Albany of a colonial department for Indian affairs, with Robert Livingston as its first head.

Philip was known to be in the Berkshires in western Massachusetts that winter and New Englanders accused Andros of sheltering him. Historian John Fiske suggests that Philip's purpose was not to draw the Haudenosaunee into the conflict but instead to draw the Mahicans into the conflict to attack Albany. An offer by Andros to send New York troops into Massachusetts to attack Philip was rebuffed based on the idea that it was a covert ploy to assert authority over the Connecticut River again. Instead, Mohawks from the Albany area did battle with Philip, driving him eastward. When Connecticut authorities later appealed to Andros for assistance, Andros replied that it was "strange" that they would do so, considering their previous behavior, and refused to help.

In July 1676, Andros established a haven for the Mahicans and other Indian war refugees at Schaghticoke. Although the conflict came to an end in southern New England in 1676, there continued to be friction between the Abenakis of northern New England and New England settlers. These prompted Andros to send a force to the duke's territory in Maine, where they established a fort at Pemaquid (present-day Bristol). Andros annoyed Massachusetts fishermen by restricting their use of the duke's land for drying fish.

In November 1677, Andros departed for England, where he would spend the following year. During this visit, he was knighted as a reward for his performance as governor, and he sat in on meetings of the Lords of Trade in which agents for Massachusetts Bay defended its charter, and gave detailed accounts of the state of his colony.

=== Southern border disputes ===
The southernmost territories of the duke, roughly encompassing northern Delaware, were desired by Charles Calvert, Baron Baltimore, who sought to extend the reach of his proprietary Province of Maryland into the area. At the same time, Calvert was seeking an end to a frontier war with the Haudenosaunee to the north, having persuaded the intervening Susquehannocks to move to the Potomac River, well within Maryland territory. Furthermore, the Lenape, who dominated Delaware Bay, were unhappy with seizures of their lands by Virginia and Maryland settlers, and war between these groups had been imminent in 1673 when the Dutch retook New York.

When Andros came to New York, he moved to stabilize the situation. He befriended the Lenape sachems (chiefs), convincing them to act as mediators between the English and other tribes. Peace appeared to be imminent when Bacon's Rebellion broke out in Virginia, resulting in an attack on the Susquehannock fort on the Potomac. The surviving Susquehannocks sneaked out of the fort one night, some making their way east toward Delaware Bay. In June 1676, Andros offered, in exchange for their moving into his jurisdiction, to protect them from their enemies among the Virginian and Maryland settlers. He also extended an offer given by the Mohawk for the Susquehannocks to settle among them. These offers were well received, but Maryland authorities could not convince their Indian allies to accept Andros's offered peace terms, organizing them to march toward the Delaware to fulfill the goal of strengthening the Maryland claim to the area. Andros responded by urging the Susquehannocks to retreat into New York, where they would be beyond Maryland's reach, and delivering a strongly worded threat to Maryland, that it would either have to acknowledge his sovereignty over the Susquehannocks, or they would have to take them back peaceably. He also offered his services as a mediator, pointing out that the absence of the Susquehannocks now left Maryland settlements open to direct attack by the Haudenosaunee.

In a council held at the Lenape village of Shackamaxon (site of present-day Philadelphia) in February and March 1677, all of the major parties met; still, no final agreements were reached, and Andros ordered the Susquehannocks remaining with the Lenape to disperse to other parts of New York in April. Maryland sent Henry Coursey to New York to engage Andros and eventually the Haudenosaunee in peace talks, while at the same time, they sent surveyors to lay out plots on land also claimed by New York on Delaware Bay. Coursey was instructed to offer Andros what was, in essence, a £100 bribe that an Indian peace might be reached in exchange for that land. Andros refused the bribe, and Coursey ended up being compelled to negotiate further through Andros and the Mohawk in Albany. The peace agreed upon in negotiations that followed in Albany in the summer of 1677 is considered one of the foundations of the set of alliances and treaties called the Covenant Chain.

Although Andros could not prevent Baltimore from granting some land on the Delaware, he successfully blunted the Maryland leader's attempt to control an even greater portion of land. The duke eventually deeded those lands to William Penn, and they became part of the state of Delaware.

=== Control of the Jerseys ===
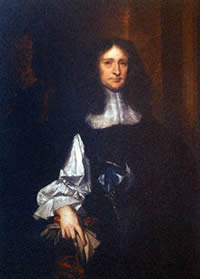
Sir George Carteret, proprietor of East Jersey

The governance of the Jerseys also created problems for Andros. James had awarded the territory west of the Hudson River to proprietors John Berkeley and George Carteret, and Berkeley had then deeded the western portion (which became known as West Jersey) to a partnership of Quakers. Berkeley had not transferred his proprietary rights to this group, and the exact nature of the rights James had given both Berkeley and Carteret was disputed, in part, because James believed that the second patent granted to him in 1674 overrode the earlier grants he had made to Berkeley and Carteret.

This resulted in conflict when Andros attempted to extend his government over East Jersey, the territory governed on behalf of Carteret by the latter's cousin Philip. Possibly based on orders given to him during his visit to England, Andros began to assert New York authority over East Jersey after George Carteret's death in 1680. Despite a friendly personal relationship between Andros and Governor Carteret, the governance issue eventually prompted Andros to have Carteret arrested. In a dispute centering on the collection of customs duties in ports on the Jersey side of the Hudson, Andros, in 1680, sent a company of soldiers to Philip Carteret's home in Elizabethtown. According to Carteret's account of the incident, he was beaten by the troops, who jailed him in New York.

A jury acquitted Carteret on all charges in a trial over which Andros presided. Carteret returned to New Jersey, but injuries he sustained in the arrest affected his health, and he died in 1682. In the aftermath of the incident, the Duke of York surrendered his claims to East Jersey to the Carterets. Andros acquired in 1683, from the widow of Carteret, for £200, the Patent to the Lordship of Alderney.

A less contentious standoff also occurred when settlers sent by William Penn sought to establish what is now Burlington, New Jersey. Andros insisted they had no right to settle there without the duke's permission. Still, he agreed to allow their settlement after they agreed to receive commissions falling under the authority of the New York gubernatorial administration. This situation was permanently resolved in 1680 when York renounced in favor of Penn his remaining claims to West Jersey.

=== Recall and analysis ===
The political opponents of Andros in the colony brought several charges against him to the Duke of York. Among them were accusations of favoritism toward Dutch business owners and engaging in business for private gain rather than that of the duke. Statements were also made to the duke that claimed that his revenues were lower than they should have been; this, in addition to the other complaints, led the duke to order Andros back to England to explain the situation. Andros left the province in January 1681, charging Anthony Brockholls with the administration of the New York government. Expecting a short visit to England, his wife remained in New York.

During his time in New York, he was thought to have demonstrated good administrative abilities. Still, his manner was considered imperious by his opponents among the colonists, and he made numerous enemies during his tenure as governor.

== Dominion of New England ==
In 1686 he was appointed governor of the Dominion of New England. He arrived in Boston on 20 December 1686, and immediately assumed power. His commission called for governance by himself, with a council. The initial composition of the council included representatives from each of the colonies the dominion absorbed. Still, because of the inconvenience of travel and the fact that travel costs were not reimbursed, the council's quorums were dominated by representatives from Massachusetts and Plymouth. The Lords of Trade had insisted that he govern without an assembly, something he expressed concern over while his commission was being drafted. In a brief work, Sir Edmund Andros, historian Henry Ferguson attested to the fact that the deliberation of certain policies by an assembly of legislators may have proven inefficient.

The Dominion initially consisted of the territories of the Massachusetts Bay Colony (including present-day Maine), Plymouth Colony, Rhode Island, Connecticut and New Hampshire, and was extended to include New York, and East and West Jersey in 1688. Andros's wife, who had joined him in Boston, died in 1688, not long after her arrival.

=== Church of England ===
Shortly after his arrival, Andros asked each of the Puritan churches in Boston if its meetinghouse could be used for the Church of England services. When he was rebuffed, he demanded and was given keys to Samuel Willard's Third Church in 1687. Services were held there under the auspices of Rev. Robert Ratcliff until 1688, when King's Chapel was built. These actions highlighted him as pro-Anglican in the eyes of local Puritans, who would later accuse him of involvement in a "horrid Popish plot".

=== Revenue laws ===
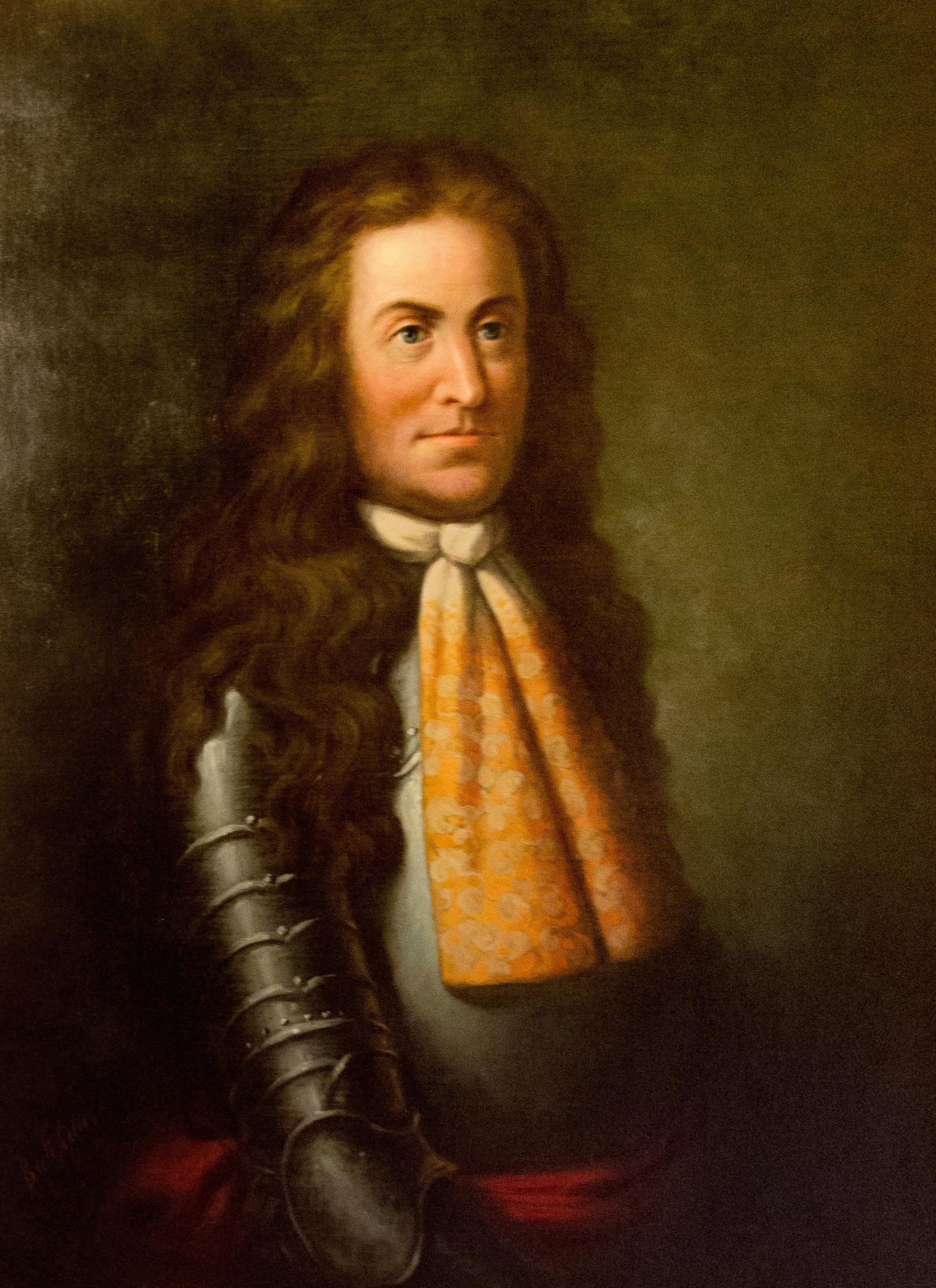
1899 portrait of Andros by Frederick Stone Batcheller

His council engaged in a lengthy process to harmonize dominion and English laws. This work consumed so much time that Andros, in March 1687, issued a proclamation stating that pre-existing laws would remain in effect until they were revised. Since Massachusetts had no pre-existing tax laws, a scheme of taxation was created that would apply to the entire dominion. Developed by a committee of landowners, the first proposal derived its revenues from import duties, principally alcohol. After much debate, a different proposal was abruptly proposed and adopted, reviving previous Massachusetts tax laws. These laws had been unpopular with farmers who felt the taxes on livestock were too high. To bring in immediate revenue, Andros also received approval to increase the import duties on alcohol.

Many Massachusetts communities stiffly resisted the first attempts to enforce the revenue laws. Several towns refused to choose commissioners to assess the town population and estates, and officials from a number of them were consequently arrested and brought to Boston. Some were fined and released, while others were imprisoned until they promised to perform their duties. The leaders of Ipswich, who had been most vocal in opposing the law, were tried and convicted of misdemeanor offenses.

The other provinces did not resist the imposition of the new law, even though, at least in Rhode Island, the rates were higher than they had been under the previous colonial administration. Plymouth's relatively poor landowners were hard hit because of the high rates on livestock, and funds derived from whaling, once sources of profit for the individual towns, were now directed to the dominion government.

=== Town meeting laws ===
One consequence of the tax protest was that Andros sought to restrict town meetings since these were where that protest had begun. He, therefore, introduced a law that limited meetings to a single annual meeting solely for electing officials and explicitly banned meetings at other times for any reason. This loss of local power was widely hated. Many protests were made that the town meeting and tax laws were violations of the Magna Carta, which guaranteed taxation by representatives of the people. It was noted that those who made these complaints had, during the colonial charter, excluded large numbers of voters through the requirement of church membership and then taxed them.

=== Land title reform ===
Andros had been instructed to bring colonial land title practices more in line with those in England and introduce quit-rents to raise colonial revenues. Titles previously issued in Massachusetts, New Hampshire, and Maine under the colonial administration often suffered from defects of the form (for example, lacking an imprint of the colonial seal), and most of them did not include a quit-rent payment. Land grants in colonial Connecticut and Rhode Island had been made before either colony had a charter, and there were conflicting claims in some areas.

How Andros approached the issue was necessarily divisive since it threatened any landowner whose title was dubious. Some landowners went through the confirmation process, but many refused since they did not want to face the possibility of losing their land, and they viewed the process as a thinly veiled land grab. The Puritans of Plymouth and Massachusetts, some of whom had extensive landholdings, were among the latter. Since all of the existing land titles in Massachusetts had been granted under the now-vacated colonial charter, Andros essentially declared them void. He required landowners to recertify their ownership, paying fees to the dominion and becoming subject to the charging of a quit-rent.

Andros attempted to compel the certification of ownership by issuing writs of intrusion, but large landowners who owned many parcels contested these individually rather than recertifying all of their lands.

=== Connecticut charter ===
Since Andros's commission included Connecticut, he asked Connecticut Governor Robert Treat to surrender the colonial charter not long after he arrived in Boston. Unlike Rhode Island, whose officials readily acceded to the dominion, Connecticut officials formally acknowledged Andros's authority but did little to assist him. They continued to run their government according to the charter, holding quarterly legislature meetings and electing colony-wide officials, while Treat and Andros negotiated over the surrender of the charter.

In October 1687, Andros finally decided to travel to Connecticut to see the matter personally. Accompanied by an honor guard, he arrived in Hartford on 31 October and met with the colonial leadership that evening. According to legend, the charter was laid out on the table for all to see during this meeting. The lights in the room unexpectedly went out, and when relit, the charter had disappeared. The charter was said to have been hidden in a nearby oak tree (referred to afterward as the Charter Oak) so that a search of nearby buildings would not locate the document.

Whatever the truth of the account, Connecticut records show that its government formally surrendered its seals and ceased operation that day. Andros then traveled throughout the colony, making judicial and other appointments, before returning to Boston. On 29 December 1687, the dominion council formally extended its laws over Connecticut, completing the assimilation of the New England colonies.

=== Inclusion of New York and the Jerseys ===
On 7 May 1688, the provinces of New York, East Jersey, and West Jersey were added to the Dominion. Because they were remote from Boston, where Andros had his seat, New York and the Jerseys were run by Lieutenant Governor Francis Nicholson from New York City. Nicholson, an army captain and protégé of colonial secretary William Blathwayt, came to Boston in early 1687 as part of Andros's honor guard and had been promoted to his council.

During the summer of 1688, Andros traveled first to New York and then to the Jerseys to establish his commission. Dominion governance of the Jerseys was complicated because the proprietors, whose charters had been revoked, had retained their property and petitioned Andros for what were traditional manorial rights. The dominion period in the Jerseys was relatively uneventful due to their distance from the power centers and the unexpected end of the dominion in 1689.

=== Indian diplomacy ===
In 1687 the governor of New France, the Marquis de Denonville, launched an attack against Seneca villages in what is now western New York. His objective was to disrupt trade between the English at Albany and the Haudenosaunee confederation, to which the Seneca belonged, and to break the Covenant Chain, a peace Andros had negotiated in 1677 while he was governor of New York. New York Governor Thomas Dongan appealed for help, and King James ordered Andros to render assistance. James also entered into negotiations with Louis XIV of France, easing tensions on the northwestern frontier. On New England's northeastern frontier, however, the Abenaki harbored grievances against New England settlers and began an offensive in early 1688. Andros made an expedition into Maine early in the year, raiding several Indian settlements. He also raided the trading outpost and home of Jean-Vincent d'Abbadie de Saint-Castin on Penobscot Bay. His careful preservation of the Catholic Castin's chapel would be a source of later accusations of "popery" against Andros.

When Andros took over the administration of New York in August 1688, he met with the Haudenosaunee at Albany to renew the covenant. In this meeting, he annoyed the Haudenosaunee by referring to them as "children" (implying subservience to the English) rather than "brethren" (implying equality). He returned to Boston amid further attacks on the New England frontier by Abenaki parties, who admitted that they were doing so in part because of French encouragement.

During Andros's presence in New York, the situation in Maine deteriorated again, with groups of colonists raiding Indian villages and taking prisoners. These actions were taken per a directive issued by dominion councillors remaining in Boston, who ordered frontier militia commanders to take into custody any Abenaki suspected of participating in the raids. This directive sparked a problem in Maine, when twenty Abenaki, including women and children, were taken into custody by colonial militia. The local authorities faced the dilemma of housing the captives, shipping them first to Falmouth and then to Boston, angering other natives, who seized English hostages to ensure the safe return of the captives. Andros castigated the Mainers for their unwarranted acts and ordered the Indians released and returned to Maine. A brief skirmish during exchanging captives resulted in the deaths of four English hostages and sparked discontent in Maine. Faced with this discord, Andros returned to Maine with a significant force and began constructing additional fortifications to protect the settlers, including Fort Andross. Andros spent the winter in Maine and returned to Boston in March upon hearing rumors of revolution in England and discontent in Boston.

=== Revolt ===
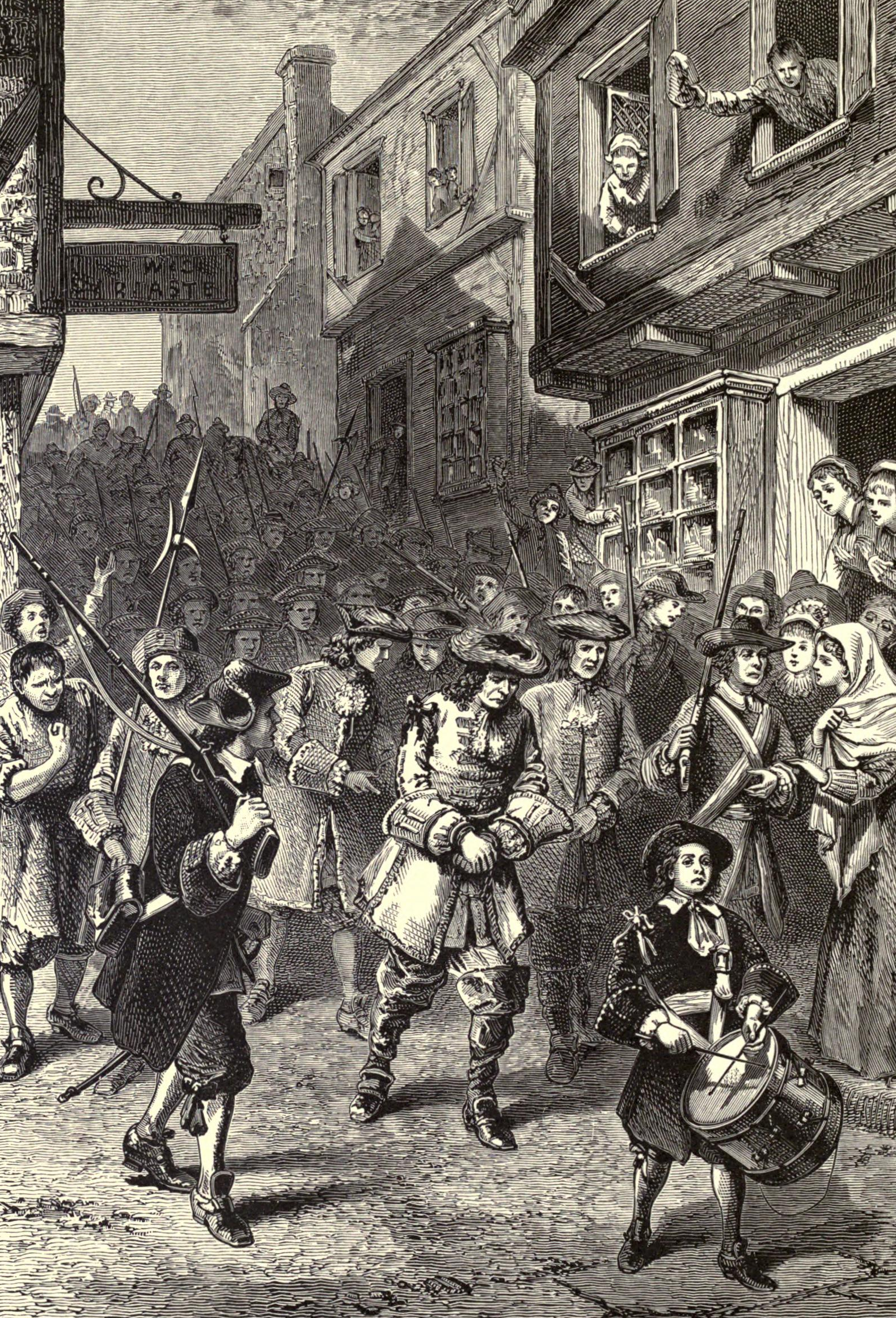
Andros being marched through Boston during the 1689 Boston revolt

On 18 April 1689, soon after news reached Boston of the overthrow of James II of England, the colonists of Boston rose against his rule. A well-organized "mob" descended on the city, arresting dominion officials and Anglicans. Andros had his quarters in Fort Mary, a garrison house on the city's south side, where many officials took refuge. The old Massachusetts colonial leadership, restored due to the rebellion and headed by ex-governor Simon Bradstreet, then summoned Governor Andros to surrender, for his safety because of the mob which they claimed "whereof we were wholly ignorant". He refused, and instead tried to escape to the Rose, the only Royal Navy ship near Boston at the time. However, the boat sent from the Rose was intercepted by militia, and Andros was forced back into Fort Mary. Negotiations ensued, and Andros agreed to leave the fort to meet with the rebel council. Promised safe conduct, he was marched under guard to the townhouse where the council had assembled. He was told that "they must & would have the Government in their own hands" and that he was under arrest. Daniel Fisher grabbed him by the collar and took him to the home of dominion official John Usher and held under close watch.

After Fort Mary fell into rebel hands on the 19th, Andros was moved there from Usher's house. He was confined there with Joseph Dudley and other dominion officials until 7 June, when he was transferred to Castle Island. During this period of captivity, he is said to have attempted an escape dressed in women's clothing. The story, although it circulated widely, was disputed by the Anglican minister Robert Ratcliff, who claimed that story and others had "not the least foundation of Truth" and that they were "falsehoods, and lies" propagated to "render the Governour odious to his people". He escaped Castle Island on 2 August after his servant plied the sentries with alcohol. He managed to flee to Rhode Island but was quickly recaptured and thereafter kept in virtual solitary confinement. He and others were held for ten months before being sent to England for trial. The Massachusetts agents in London refused to sign the charges made against him, so the court summarily dismissed them and freed him. When Andros was questioned about the various accusations that had been leveled against him, he pointed out that all of his actions had been taken to bring colonial laws into conformance with English law, or they were specifically taken in pursuit of his commission and instructions.

While Andros was in captivity, the New York government of Lieutenant Governor Francis Nicholson was simultaneously deposed by a military faction led by Jacob Leisler, Leisler's Rebellion. Leisler would govern New York until 1691 when he was captured and executed by a force led by newly appointed provincial governor Henry Sloughter. Andros was eventually allowed to depart for England; by that point, the Dominion of New England had effectively ceased to exist, with the colonies in the dominion having reverted to their previous forms of governance. Massachusetts and its surrounding territories were reorganized into the Province of Massachusetts Bay in 1691.

== Governor of Virginia ==
Andros was well received at court upon his return to England. The new king, William III, recalled that Andros had visited his court in the Netherlands and expressed approval of Andros's service. In search of employment, Andros offered his services as a spy, offering the idea of going to Paris, ostensibly to meet with the exiled James, but to actually attempt to acquire French military plans. This plan was rejected. He married his second wife, Elizabeth Crisp Clapham, in England in July 1691. She was the widow of Christopher Clapham, who was connected by that marriage to his first wife's family.

Andros's next opportunity for employment came with the resignation in February 1692 of Lord Effingham as governor of the Province of Virginia. Although Francis Nicholson, formerly dominion lieutenant governor, was then serving as lieutenant governor of Virginia and sought the superior position, William awarded the governorship to Andros, and awarded Nicholson yet another lieutenant governorship, this time that of Maryland. This was destined to make Andros's tenure more complicated because his relationship with Nicholson had deteriorated for other reasons. The exact reasons for this hostility are unclear: one contemporary wrote that Nicholson "especially [resented] Sir Edmund Andros, against whom he has a particular pique on account of some earlier dealings".

Andros arrived in Virginia on 13 September 1692 and began his duties a week later. Nicholson graciously received him and not long after sailed for England. Andros settled at Middle Plantation (the future site of Williamsburg), where he would live until 1695. He worked to organize the provincial records, the maintenance of which had suffered since Bacon's Rebellion, and promoted the enforcement of laws designed to prevent slave rebellions.

He encouraged the diversification of Virginia's economy, which was then almost entirely dependent on tobacco. The export-oriented economy was also badly hurt by the ongoing Nine Years' War, because of which merchant ships were required to travel in convoys. Virginia received no military escorts for several years, so their products did not reach Europe. Andros encouraged the introduction of new crops like cotton and flax and the manufacture of fabric.

Virginia was the first colonial post where Andros had to work with a local assembly. His relationship with the House of Burgesses was generally cordial, but he encountered some resistance, especially to measures related to the war and colonial defenses. He hired armed vessels to patrol the colony's waters and contributed financially to New York's colonial defenses, which formed a bulwark against the possibility of French and Indian incursions into Virginia. In 1696 Andros was ordered by the king to send troops to New York, for which the burgesses reluctantly appropriated £1,000. Andros's management of colonial defense and Indian relations was successful: Virginia, unlike New York and New England, was not attacked during the war.

During his tenure, Andros made an enemy of James Blair, a prominent Anglican minister. Blair was working to establish a new college for educating Anglican ministers, and he believed Andros did not support the idea. However, Blair and Nicholson worked closely together on this idea, with Nicholson often coming from Maryland for meetings on the subject. The two men were united in their dislike of Andros, and their activities helped to cause Andros's resignation. The College of William and Mary was founded in 1693. Despite Blair's claims that Andros was unsupportive, Andros donated the cost of the bricks to construct the college's chapel from his own funds and convinced the House of Burgesses to approve funding of £100 per year for the college.

Blair's complaints, many of them vague and inaccurate, went to London, where proceedings into Andros's conduct began at the Board of Trade and the Church of England ecclesiastical courts in 1697. Andros had lost most of his support on the Board of Trade when a Whig faction came to power, and his advocates were unable to sway the board in favor of him. Anglican bishops staunchly supported Blair and Nicholson. In March 1698, Andros, complaining of fatigue and illness, asked to be recalled.

== Later years ==
Andros's recall was announced in London in May 1698; Nicholson replaced him. He returned to England and resumed his post as bailiff of Guernsey. He divided his time between Guernsey and London, where he had a house in Denmark Hill. His second wife died in 1703, and he married for the third time in 1707, to Elizabeth Fitzherbert.

In 1704, Queen Anne named him Lieutenant Governor of Guernsey, a post he held until 1708. He died in London on 24 February 1714 and was buried at St Anne's Church, Soho. Elizabeth Andros died in 1717 and was buried near Edmund in the same church. The church was destroyed during the Second World War, and there is no longer any trace of their graves. He had no issue by any of his wives.

== Legacy ==
The historian Michael Kammen states that Andros failed in all of his roles in the colonies:

... in part because he was neither ruthless enough to cow his provincial subjects into submission nor ingratiating enough to win himself a broad base of local support. In part because he came to New England at a critical moment without prior experience in the peculiar religious and political development of that area. And in part, finally, because he was continually caught in a cross fire between imperious assumptions of the Crown and unfamiliar imperatives of colonial life.

Andros remains a notorious figure in New England, especially in Connecticut, which officially excludes him from its list of colonial governors, but his portrait hangs in the Hall of Governors in the State Museum across from the State Capitol in Hartford. Although he was disliked in the colonies, he was recognized in England as an effective administrator by implementing the policies that he had been ordered to carry out and advancing the crown's agenda. The biographer Mary Lou Lustig notes that he was "an accomplished statesman, a brave soldier, a polished courtier, and a devoted servant", but his style was often "autocratic, arbitrary, and dictatorial", he lacked tact, and he had difficulty reaching compromises.

Similarly, Andros was featured as an antagonist in the 1879 novel Captain Nelson, described as a "romance of colonial days".

Andros appears in several episodes of The Witch of Blackbird Pond (1958) in which his conflict with the Connecticut colonists forms the background to the protagonist's more personal problems. It is believed that Andros Island in the Bahamas was named for him. Early proprietors of the Bahamas included members of his first wife's family, the Cravens.

== Bibliography ==
- Adams, James Truslow (2008) [1922]. The Founding of New England. Atlantic Monthly Press; full text online. ISBN 9780844615103.
- Barnes, Viola Florence (1960) [1923]. The Dominion of New England: A Study in British Colonial Policy. New York: Frederick Ungar. ISBN 978-0-8044-1065-6. OCLC 395292. online
- Brodhead, James (1871). History of the State of New York. New York: Harper & Brothers. OCLC 1383698.
- Dunn, Randy (2007). "Patronage and Governance in Francis Nicholson's Empire". English Atlantics Revisited. Montreal: McGill-Queens Press: 59–80. doi:10.1515/9780773560406-006. ISBN 978-0-7735-3219-9. OCLC 429487739.
- Ferguson, Henry (1894). Essays in American History: Sir Edmund Andros. New York: J. Pott. p. 111. OCLC 3916490.
- Fiske, John (1899). The Dutch and Quaker Colonies in America. Boston: Houghton, Mifflin. OCLC 423775.
- Fleming, Thomas (1984). New Jersey: A History. New York: W. W. Norton. ISBN 978-0-393-30180-9. OCLC 10557902.
- Hall, Michael Garibaldi (1960). Edward Randolph and the American Colonies. Chapel Hill, NC: University of North Carolina Press.
- Jennings, Francis (1990). The Ambiguous Iroquois Empire: The Covenant Chain Confederation of Indian Tribes with English Colonies from its Beginnings to the Lancaster Treaty of 1744. New York: W. W. Norton. ISBN 978-0-393-01719-9. OCLC 9066383.
- Kimball, Everett (1911). The Public Life of Joseph Dudley. New York: Longmans, Green. OCLC 1876620.
- Lovejoy, David (1987). The Glorious Revolution in America. Middletown, CT: Wesleyan University Press. ISBN 978-0-8195-6177-0. OCLC 14212813.
- Lustig, Mary Lou (2002). The Imperial Executive in America: Sir Edmund Andros, 1637–1714. Fairleigh Dickinson University Press. ISBN 978-0-8386-3936-8. OCLC 470360764.
- McKinley, Albert E. (July 1901). "The Transition From Dutch to English Rule in New York: A Study in Political Imitation". The American Historical Review. 6 (4). Oxford University Press on behalf of the American Historical Association: 593–724. doi:10.2307/1834176. JSTOR 1834176.
- Miller, Guy Howard (May 1968). "Rebellion in Zion: The Overthrow of the Dominion of New England". Historian. 30 (3): 439–459. doi:10.1111/j.1540-6563.1968.tb00328.x. JSTOR 24441216.
- Moore, Jacob Bailey (1851). Lives of the Governors of New Plymouth and Massachusetts Bay. Boston: C. D. Strong. p. 403. OCLC 11362972.
- Palfrey, John Gorham (1858). History of New England. Vol. 3. New York: Little, Brown and Company.
- Scharf, John Thomas (1879). History of Maryland. Baltimore, MD: J. B. Piet. p. 258. OCLC 4663774.
- Sosin, Jack (1982). English America and the Revolution of 1688: Royal Administration and the Structure of Provincial Government. Lincoln: University of Nebraska Press. ISBN 978-0-8032-4131-2. OCLC 239750259.
- Stark, James Henry (1891). Stark's History and Guide to the Bahama Islands. Boston: self-published. OCLC 1550866.
- Steele, Ian K (1989). "Origins of Boston's Revolutionary Declaration of 18 April 1689". New England Quarterly. 62 (1): 75–81. doi:10.2307/366211. JSTOR 366211.
- Warden, G.B. Boston: 1689–1776 (Little Brown, 1970), pp. 3–14 on the overthrow. online
- Webb, Stephen Saunders (1998). Lord Churchill's Coup: The Anglo-American Empire and the Glorious Revolution Reconsidered. Syracuse, NY: Syracuse University Press. ISBN 978-0-8156-0558-4. OCLC 39756272.

=== Primary sources ===
- Hall, Michael G. et al. eds. The Glorious Revolution in America: Documents on the Colonial Crisis of 1689 (1964) excerpt
- Whitmore, William Henry, ed. (1868). The Andros Tracts: Being a Collection of Pamphlets and Official Papers Issued During the Period Between the Overthrow of the Andros Government and the Establishment of the Second Charter of Massachusetts (1868–1874). Boston: The Prince Society. OCLC 1842576.

Government offices
Preceded by Anthony Colve as Governor of New Netherland	Proprietary Governor of the Province of New York; 11 February 1674 – 18 April 1683	Succeeded by Anthony Brockholls (acting)
Preceded by Joseph Dudley as President of the Council of New England	Governor of the Dominion of New England; 20 December 1686 – 18 April 1689	Dominion dissolved
Preceded by Baron Howard of Effingham	Colonial Governor of Virginia; 1692–1698	Succeeded by Francis Nicholson
Preceded by Sir Thomas Lawrence	Proprietary Governor of Maryland; 1693	Succeeded by Nicholas Greenberry
Preceded by Nicholas Greenberry	Proprietary Governor of Maryland; 1694	Succeeded by Sir Thomas Lawrence
