= Thomas Tench =

9th Royal Governor of Maryland

9th Royal Governor of Maryland
- In office 1702–1704
- Monarchs: William III; Anne
- Preceded by: Nathaniel Blakiston
- Succeeded by: John Seymour

Personal details
- Born: c. 1650s England
- Died: 1708
- Resting place: St. James' Parish
- Spouses: Margaret Burrage (d. 1694); Margaret
- Profession: Official; politician; merchant; jurist

Thomas Tench (c. 1650s – 1708) was the 9th Royal Governor of Maryland, from 1702 to 1704. He was appointed by his predecessor, Nathaniel Blakiston, and was succeeded by Colonel John Seymour.

== Early life ==
Thomas Tench was probably born in the 1650s in England. He immigrated to the Anne Arundel County, Maryland in 1684.

== Personal life ==
Tench married Margaret Burrage in 1684 or 1685. She had been previously married to Nathan Smith (d. 1684). She had three children from her previous marriage. She died in 1694. Tench married Margaret by 1704.

== Career ==
Tench was a merchant and transported servants from London to Maryland between 1675 and 1684. In 1694, his ship was seized for violating the Navigation Acts. Tench served as justice in Anne Arundel County from 1685 to 1692. He also served as coroner of Anne Arundel County from 1689 to 1692.

Tench served in the upper house in Maryland from 1692 to 1693, 1694–1697, 1697/1698–1700, 1701–1704 and 1704–1707. In 1702, He served as the 9th Royal Governor of Maryland. Tench served as a vestryman at Christ Church in Philadelphia.

== Death ==
Tench died in 1708. He was buried at St. James' Parish in Anne Arundel County.
