= Thomas Lawrence (governor of Maryland) =

British general and colonial official

Sir Thomas Lawrence Bt

2nd and 6th Royal Governor of Maryland
- In office 1693–1693
- Monarch: William III
- Preceded by: Lionel Copley
- Succeeded by: Edmund Andros
- In office 1694–1694
- Monarch: William III
- Preceded by: Edmund Andros
- Succeeded by: Francis Nicholson

Personal details
- Born: c. 1645 Chelsea, Middlesex, England
- Died: April 25, 1714 (aged 68–69) London, England
- Profession: Official

Sir Thomas Lawrence, 3rd Baronet (c. 1645 – 1714) was the 2nd Royal Governor of Maryland in 1693, elected by the Governor's Council following the death of Sir Lionel Copley, (1648-1693). He governed the colony for only a few weeks before the new royally appointed governor, Edmund Andros, (1637-1714), arrived from his trans-Atlantic trip to take over control of the colony. He was briefly the 6th Royal Governor of Maryland a second time when Andros then left the colony in 1694 (later also served as governor in the Dominion of New England and Virginia). Lawrence's successor was Francis Nicholson.

== Early life ==
Thomas Lawrence was born c. 1645 in Chelsea, Middlesex, England. He was the eldest son of Sir John Lawrence, 2nd Baronet and Mary Hempson. He emigrated in 1692 in Province of Maryland, settling in Mary's City (St. Mary's County) and Annapolis, while his family probably stayed in England.

== Career ==
In 1693 he was President of the Council and acting Royal Governor of Province of Maryland. He governed Maryland for a few weeks and was replaced by Edmund Andros. Lawrence returned to England in 1705/6.

== Death ==
Lawrence died on April 25, 1714, in London. At his death, the baronetcy became extinct.

Baronetage of England
Preceded by John Lawrence	Baronet (of Iver); 1690–1714	Extinct
