= Edward Lloyd II =

11th Royal Governor of Maryland

11th Royal Governor of Maryland
- In office 1709–1714
- Monarch: Anne
- Preceded by: John Seymour
- Succeeded by: John Hart

Personal details
- Born: February 7, 1671 Talbot County, Maryland, British America
- Died: March 20, 1719 (aged 48)
- Resting place: Wye House
- Spouse: Sarah Covington (m. 1704)
- Children: 6
- Relatives: Edward Lloyd IV grandson); Edward Lloyd V (great-grandson)
- Profession: Official; merchant; jurist
- Military career
- Allegiance: Great Britain
- Rank: Major General

Edward Lloyd II (February 7, 1671 – March 20, 1719) was the 11th Royal Governor of Maryland from 1709 to 1714. He attained the rank of Major General of the Eastern Shore militia.

== Early life and family ==
Edward Lloyd II was born on February 7, 1671, at Wye plantation in Talbot County, Maryland to Henrietta Maria (née Neale) Bennett (1647–1697) and Colonel Philemon Lloyd (c. 1646–1685). He was the eldest of ten children. His grandfather was Edward Lloyd I.

Upon his father's death in 1685, he inherited "White House and Woolman Neck land". In 1686, after his grandfather's death, he was left Wye plantation.

Lloyd spawned a long line of Edward Lloyd's who were active in Maryland politics, including Edward Lloyd IV, a delegate to the Continental Congress, and Edward Lloyd V, who would serve as Governor of Maryland from 1809 to 1811.

== Career ==
Like his father and grandfather, Lloyd exported tobacco to England and imported and sold goods from England. He also traded with Barbados.

Lloyd was named justice of the Talbot County court in October 1694 and served until August 1701. By 1698, he was a colonel of the county militia, and served in that role until 1707. In 1707, he was named Major General of the Eastern Shore militia.

In March 1698, he was elected to the Maryland General Assembly's lower house. He would serve in the lower house until 1701, when he was appointed to the upper house. He remained in the upper house until 1716. He succeeded John Seymour as Royal Governor of Maryland after his death in 1709. He was elected President of the Council when the senior member of the council, Colonel Francis Jenkins, failed to assert his rights of seniority. Lloyd was succeeded by John Hart.

During his tenure as Royal Governor, Lloyd tried to maintain Seymour's policies, but the lower house prevailed on issues like judicial procedures and regulation of the tobacco trade.

== Personal life ==
Lloyd married Sarah Covington (1683–1755) on February 1, 1704. Together, they had five sons and one daughter.

== Death ==
Lloyd died on March 20, 1719. He was buried at the family's burial ground at Wye House.
