= Nehemiah Blakiston =

Governor of Maryland from 1691 to 1692

2nd Leader of the Protestant Associators of Maryland
- In office 1691–1692
- Preceded by: John Coode
- Succeeded by: Sir Lionel Copley (1st Royal Governor)

Personal details
- Relatives: Nathaniel Blakiston, John Blakiston
- Profession: Colonial governor

Nehemiah Blakiston was Governor of the Maryland colony from 1691 to 1692. He became Governor as the 2nd Leader of the Protestant Associators, succeeding John Coode, who has taken control of the colony, following the 1688 Glorious Revolution, in England. Blakiston was succeeded by the first Governor with an official royal appointment, Lionel Copley. He was related to Nathaniel Blakiston. He died between August 25, 1693, and December 11, 1693.
