= John Seymour (Maryland governor) =

10th Royal Governor of Maryland

10th Royal Governor of Maryland
- In office 1704–1709
- Monarch: Anne
- Preceded by: Thomas Tench
- Succeeded by: Edward Lloyd

Personal details
- Born: 1649 Gloucestershire, England
- Died: July 30, 1709 (aged 59–60) Anne Arundel County, Maryland, British America
- Resting place: St. Anne's Church
- Spouse(s): Margaret Bowles (m. 1672) Hester Newton
- Children: 3
- Profession: Official; military officer
- Military career
- Allegiance: England
- Rank: Lieutenant colonel
- Unit: Life Guards
- Conflicts: War of the Spanish Succession

Colonel John Seymour (1649 – July 30, 1709) was the 10th Royal Governor of Maryland from 1704 to 1709.

== Early life ==
John Seymour was born in 1649 in Gloucestershire, England, the eldest son of Elizabeth Lyte and Thomas Seymour (d. 1678). John descended from Sir John Seymour who was a Member of Parliament for Gloucestershire. He immigrated in 1704 to Annapolis, Maryland.

== Personal life ==
Seymour married Margaret Bowles in 1672. He later married Hester Newton. Seymour had three children: John, Robert and Jane.

== Career ==
Seymour served as captain of the colony service from 1667 to 1687. In 1687, he served as the lieutenant colonel of the Life Guards during the campaigns of William III. He also served in the Spanish campaigns in 1702.

The Earl of Nottingham presented his royal nomination to the Council of Trade and Plantations on January 11, 1703. He succeeded Thomas Tench on April 12, 1704, and was succeeded by Edward Lloyd. He attempted to resolve boundary issues, religious rights, and compensation for 'itinerant judges'. His administration instituted the qualifications for the municipal officials of Annapolis and its market and fair days.

== Death ==
Seymour died on July 30, 1709, in Anne Arundel County. He was buried at St. Anne's Church in Annapolis.
