= Lionel Copley =

1st Royal Governor of Maryland
- In office 1692–1693
- Preceded by: Nehemiah Blakiston
- Succeeded by: Thomas Lawrence

Sir Lionel Copley (1648 – September 12, 1693) was the 1st Royal Governor of Maryland from 1692 through his death in 1693. He was the first official royal governor appointed by the British crown after the colony was removed from the proprietary control of the Calvert family during the Glorious Revolution. Copley engaged in a series of political struggles with the colonial assembly and the colonial secretary, Thomas Lawrence, in the year between his arrival and his death the next year.

== Term as Governor ==
Copley arrived in the Maryland colony following a Protestant rebellion that had overthrown the proprietorship of the Catholic Calvert family. The Protestants, who were the majority in the colony, had ejected their leaders after a brief conflict, echoing the Glorious Revolution that had occurred in England in 1688. From the overthrow of the proprietary government in 1689 until the arrival of Copley in 1692, Maryland had been governed by leaders of the rebellion, who called themselves the Protestant Associators. Their rule was somewhat catholic; the only courts that met at the time were the county courts and the associators used their executive power to punish their enemies.

Copley's arrival in the colony in 1692 heralded the return of British control to the colony, though the leaders of the rebellion took care to find ways to cement their power in the elected lower house of colonial government, the assembly. Having felt that their rights were abused by a strong executive power prior to the rebellion, they sought ways to prevent a similar situation under royal control. They appointed their own clerk, a man named John Lewellin, and created a number of standing committees designed to ensure the continuity and power of the assembly. Among these were a committee on elections, which would establish that the legislature itself would have control of how its members were elected. In addition, a committee on aggrievances handled complaints from the citizenry, a committee of laws was responsible for overhauling the legal code of the colony, and a committee on accounts oversaw economic and financial legislation.

Dealing with the assembly was not the only challenge Copley faced. There were significant salaries to be derived from colonial offices, and at the same time Copley himself was appointed Governor, Thomas Lawrence was appointed Secretary of the colony, a position from which he might derive great wealth. Lawrence and Copley had argued even before their arrival in the colony, and Lawrence sailed on a later ship because of this argument. Before he arrived in September 1692, two other men had been doing the work of the Secretary and taking the proceeds that accrued with the work. As Lawrence was attempting to recoup that money, Copley made a deal with the assembly to further weaken his opponent and to increase his own coffers. The assemblymen were interested in determining exactly which government officials received how much money, in order to prevent the sort of nepotism that had occurred in the proprietary government. Copley agreed to sign legislation to that effect. Authorized by that legislation, the assembly took some of the fees that had accrued to the Secretary and allowed the Governor to receive them instead. Copley, in turn, took other fees from the Secretary's office and gave them to Nehemiah Blakiston, one of the leaders of the Protestant Associators who now sat on the Governor's council, the upper house of the legislature. Lawrence became a rallying point for Marylanders who opposed Copley's rule and that of the Governor's council. They supporting him as he continued the power struggle in a fight over the appointments of county clerks.

Meanwhile, the legislature and Governor continued the work of rebuilding colonial government following the rebellion. They rewrote the legal code of the colony, adopting many laws that had existed previously and passing new ones to address some of their grievances with the proprietary government and strengthen the institution of slavery. They also established the Church of England as the state religion of the colony, and passed laws restricting the practice of other religions. In the midst of these efforts, Copley, like many recent arrivals to the colony, suddenly took sick and died. His enemy Thomas Lawrence took over, one of a series of people who would briefly serve at the helm of the colony before the arrival of the new royally-appointed governor, Francis Nicholson.
