= Nathaniel Blakiston =

Governor of Maryland from 1698 to 1702

8th Royal Governor of Maryland
- In office 1698–1702
- Preceded by: Francis Nicholson
- Succeeded by: Thomas Tench

Personal details
- Relatives: John Blakiston (grandfather); Nehemiah Blakiston (uncle)
- Profession: Colonialist; Politician

Colonel Nathaniel Blakiston was the 8th Royal Governor of Maryland from 1698 to 1702. He succeeded Francis Nicholson and was succeeded by Thomas Tench. He was related to Nehemiah Blakiston.

== Military career ==
Nathaniel Blakiston was grandson of John Blakiston, regicide of King Charles I of England. Blakiston joined the British Army and served in the West Indies. As a soldier, Blakiston attained the lieutenant-governor rank of Montserrat island, as acting colonel.

== Colonial governor ==
In 1698, Nathaniel Blakiston was appointed governor of the British colony, of Maryland. During that time he was charged with rooting out piracy in the colonies, for example accusing slaver Henry Munday of collaborating with Pennsylvanian pirate Henry King. However, his government only lasted three years, because he had to retire for health problems, in 1701. The court of delegates chose him to serve, as their colonial agent, in London in appreciation for his services, in Monserrat. Later, from 1706 onwards, Blakiston was agent, for the Virginia Colony, in London. Then, in 1715, he was returned as the member of parliament for Mitchell. He was a loyal Whig who consistently voted with the administration during this period.

== Death ==
Nathaniel Blakiston died at the end of February 1722.
