= Francis Nicholson =

British soldier and colonial governor

Lieutenant-General Francis Nicholson

Governor of South Carolina
- In office 1721–1725
- Monarch: George I
- Preceded by: James Moore Jr.
- Succeeded by: Arthur Middleton (acting)

Governor of Nova Scotia
- In office 1712–1715
- Monarchs: Anne; George I
- Preceded by: Samuel Vetch
- Succeeded by: Samuel Vetch

Governor of Virginia
- In office 1698–1705
- Monarchs: William III; Anne
- Preceded by: George Hamilton
- Succeeded by: Edward Nott

Governor of Maryland
- In office 1694–1698
- Monarch: William III
- Preceded by: Thomas Lawrence
- Succeeded by: Nathaniel Blakiston

Lieutenant-governor of Virginia
- In office 1690–1692
- Monarchs: William III and Mary II
- Preceded by: Nathaniel Bacon (acting)
- Succeeded by: Sir Edmund Andros

Lieutenant-governor of the Dominion of New England
- In office 1688–1689
- Monarchs: James II; William III and Mary II

Personal details
- Born: 12 November 1655 Downholme, Yorkshire
- Died: 5/16 March 1727/28 London, England
- Resting place: St George's Hanover Square Church
- Profession: Army officer; colonial administrator

Military service
- Allegiance: England; Great Britain
- Branch/service: English Army; British Army
- Years of service: 1680-1727/28
- Rank: Lieutenant-General
- Battles/wars: Monmouth Rebellion; War of the Spanish Succession; Queen Anne's War; Siege of Port Royal

Lieutenant-General Francis Nicholson (12 November 1655 – 16 March 1728 [O.S. 5 March 1727]) was a British Army officer and colonial administrator who served as the governor of South Carolina from 1721 to 1725. He also served as the governor of Nova Scotia from 1712 to 1715, the governor of Virginia from 1698 to 1705, the governor of Maryland from 1694 to 1698, the lieutenant-governor of Virginia from 1690 to 1692 and the lieutenant-governor of the Dominion of New England from 1688 to 1689.

Nicholson's military service included time in Africa and Europe, after which he was sent to North America as leader of the troops supporting Governor Sir Edmund Andros in the Dominion of New England. There Nicholson distinguished himself, and was appointed lieutenant governor of the Dominion in 1688. After news of the Glorious Revolution and the overthrow of King James II reached the colonies in 1689, Andros was himself overthrown in the Boston Revolt. Nicholson himself was soon caught up in the civil unrest from Leisler's Rebellion in New York Town, and afterwards fled to England.

Nicholson next served as lieutenant governor or governor of the colonies of Virginia and Maryland. He supported the founding of the College of William and Mary, at Williamsburg, Virginia, and quarreled with Andros after Andros was selected over him as governor of Virginia. In 1709, Nicholson became involved in colonial military actions during Queen Anne's War, leading an aborted expedition against the French in New France. He then led the expedition that successfully captured Port Royal, Acadia on 2 October 1710. Afterward, Nicholson served as governor of Nova Scotia and Placentia, and was the first royal governor of the Province of South Carolina following a rebellion against its proprietors. He rose to the rank of Lieutenant-General, and died a bachelor in London, England, in 1728.

Nicholson supported public education in the colonies, and was a member of both the Society for the Propagation of the Gospel in Foreign Parts and the Royal Society. He also influenced American architecture, being responsible for the planned layout and design of colonial/provincial capitals of Annapolis, Maryland and Williamsburg, Virginia. Nicholson was one of the earliest advocates of colonial union, principally for reasons of defense against common enemies.

== Early life and military service ==
Coat of Arms of Francis Nicholson

Nicholson was born in the village of Downholme, Yorkshire, England, on 12 November 1655. Little is known of his ancestry or early life, although he apparently received some education. He served as a page in the household of Charles Paulet (later the Marquess of Winchester and the Duke of Bolton), under whose patronage his career would be advanced. He waited on Paulet's daughter Jane, who married John Egerton, Earl of Bridgewater, another patron who promoted his career.

His military career began in January 1678 when Paulet purchased for him an ensign's commission in the Holland Regiment, in which he saw service against the French in Flanders. The regiment saw no combat, and was disbanded at the end of the year. In July 1680 he purchased a staff lieutenant's commission in the newly formed 2nd Tangier Regiment, which was sent to English Tangier to reinforce the garrison holding the city. Tangier's council was then headed by the Duke of York (later King James II), and its governor was Colonel Percy Kirke. Nicholson distinguished himself in the service, carrying dispatches between the enemy Moroccan camp, Tangier, and London. In addition to favorable notice from Kirke, this brought Nicholson to the attention of the powerful colonial secretary, William Blathwayt. Tangier was abandoned in 1684, and his regiment returned to England. During the service in Tangier he met a number of people who would figure prominently North American colonial history, including Thomas Dongan and Alexander Spotswood.

Nicholson was probably with the regiment when it put down Monmouth's Rebellion in 1685, but his role in some of the more unsavory behaviour on the part of Kirke's troops is unknown. Kirke, who had been selected by Charles II as the governor of the prospective Dominion of New England, was strongly criticized for his role in the quashing of the rebellion, and James withdrew his nomination. The dominion's governorship instead went to Sir Edmund Andros, and Nicholson, now a captain, accompanied Andros as commander of a company of infantry to Boston in October 1686. Andros sent Nicholson on what was essentially a reconnaissance mission to French Acadia. Under the cover of delivering a letter protesting a variety of issues to the Acadian governor, Nicholson made careful observations of Port Royal's defenses. Nicholson impressed Andros in this service, and was soon appointed to the dominion's council.

== Dominion lieutenant governor ==
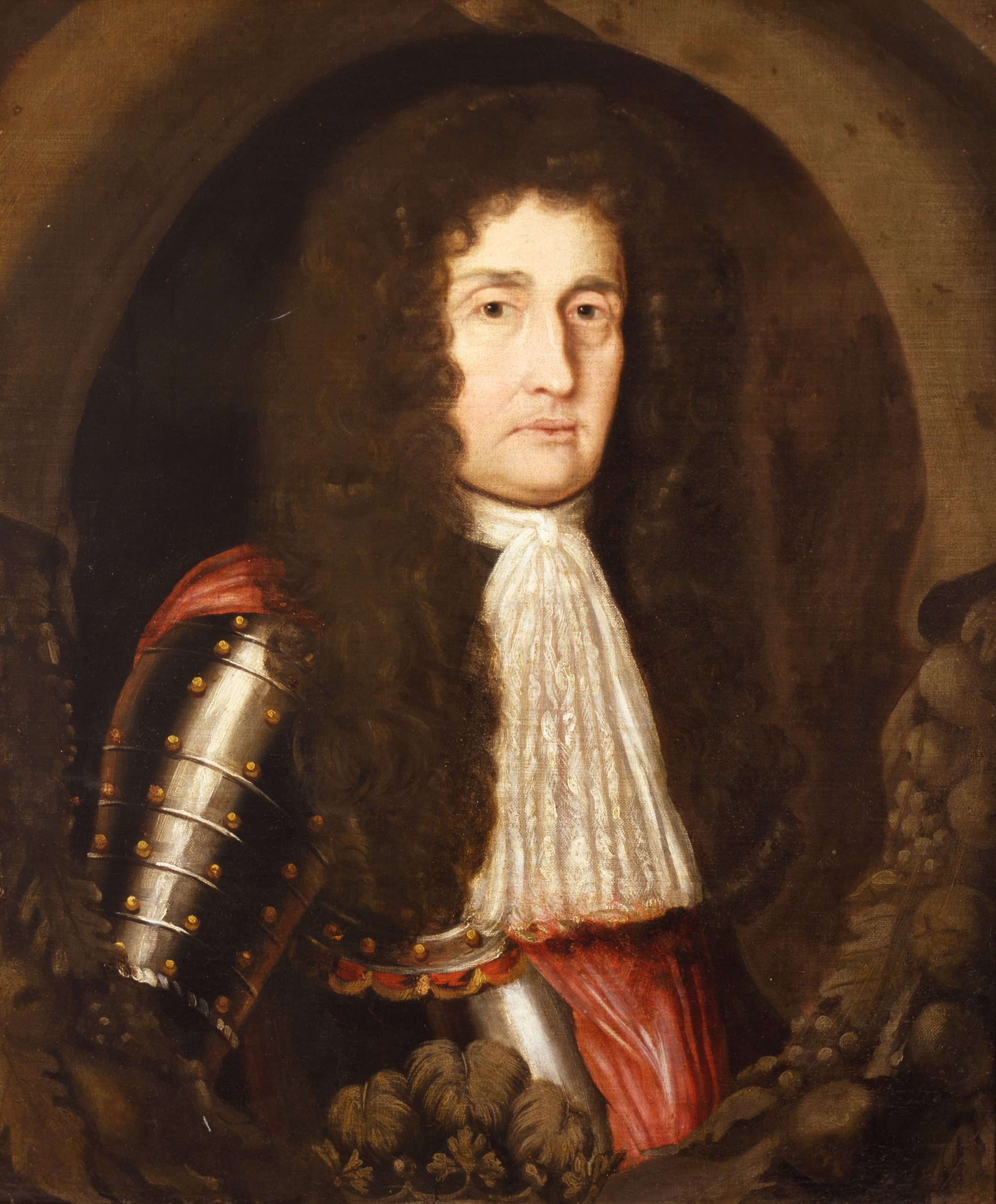
Portrait of Edmund Andros by Mary Beale

In 1688 the Lords of Trade extended the dominion to include New York and East and West Jersey. Nicholson was commissioned the dominion's lieutenant governor, and traveled with Andros to New York to take control of those colonies. Nicholson's rule, in which he was assisted by a local council but no legislative assembly, was seen by many New Yorkers as the next in a line of royal governors who "had in a most arbitrary way subverted our ancient privileges". Nicholson justified his rule by stating that the colonists were "a conquered people, and therefore ... could not could not so much [as] claim rights and priviledges as Englishmen".

Nicholson was at first seen as an improvement over the Catholic Thomas Dongan, the outgoing governor. However, the province's old guard was unhappy that Andros removed all of the provincial records to Boston, and then Nicholson alarmed the sometimes hardline Protestant population by preserving the trappings of the chapel in Fort James that Dongan and the handful of New York's Catholics had used for worship. In response to a rumored Dutch invasion of England (a rumor that turned out to be true), Nicholson in January 1689 ordered the provincial militias to be on alert to protect the province for the king. Unknown to Nicholson, events in England had already changed things.

=== Rebellion in Boston ===
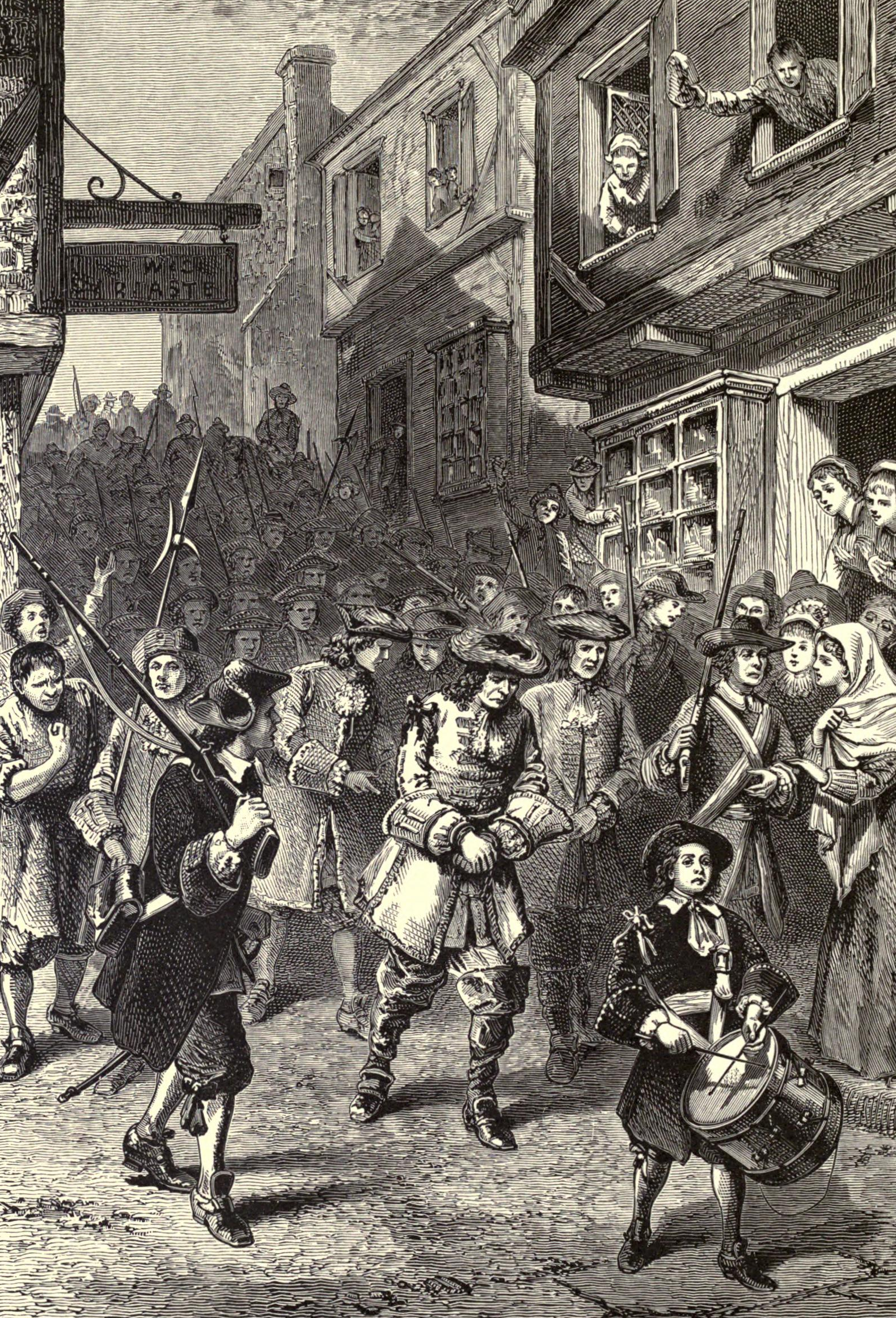
Andros being marched through Boston during the 1689 Boston revolt

After James was deposed by William III and Mary II in the Glorious Revolution in late 1688, Massachusetts rose up in rebellion against Andros, arresting him and other dominion leaders in Boston. The revolt rapidly spread through the dominion, and the New England colonies quickly restored their pre-dominion governments. When news of the Boston revolt reached New York a week later, Nicholson took no steps to announce news of it, or of the revolution in England, for fear of raising prospects of rebellion in New York. When word of the Boston revolt reached Long Island, politicians and militia leaders became more assertive, and by mid-May dominion officials had been ousted from a number of communities. At the same time, Nicholson learned that France had declared war on England, bringing the threat of French and Indian attacks on New York's northern frontier. In an attempt to mollify panicked citizenry over rumored Indian raids, Nicholson invited the militia to join the army garrison at Fort James.

Because New York's defenses were in poor condition, Nicholson's council voted to impose import duties to improve them. This move was met with immediate resistance, with a number of merchants refusing to pay the duty. One in particular was Jacob Leisler, a well-born German Calvinist immigrant merchant and militia captain. Leisler was a vocal opponent of the dominion regime, which he saw as an attempt to impose "popery" on the province, and may have played a role in subverting Nicholson's regulars. On 22 May Nicholson's council was petitioned by the militia, who, in addition to seeking more rapid improvement to the city's defenses, also wanted access to the powder magazine in the fort. This latter request was denied, heightening concerns that the city had inadequate powder supplies. This concern was further exacerbated when city leaders began hunting through the city for additional supplies.

=== Rebellion in New York ===
A minor incident on 30 May 1689 in which Nicholson made an intemperate remark to a militia officer then flared into open rebellion. Nicholson, who was well known for his temper, told the officer "I rather would see the Towne on fire than to be commanded by you". Rumors flew around the town that Nicholson was in fact prepared to burn it down. The next day Nicholson summoned the officer, and demanded he surrender his commission. Abraham de Peyster, the officer's commander and one of the wealthiest men in the city, then engaged in a heated argument with Nicholson, after which de Peyster and his brother Johannis, also a militia captain, stormed out of the council chamber.

The militia was called out, and descended en masse to Fort James, which they occupied. An officer was sent to the council to demand the keys to the powder magazine, which Nicholson eventually surrendered, to "hinder and prevent bloodshed and further mischiefe". The following day, a council of militia officers called on Jacob Leisler to take command of the city militia. He did so, and the rebels issued a declaration that they would hold the fort on behalf of the new monarchs until they sent a properly accredited governor.

At this point the militia controlled the fort, which gave them control over the harbor. When ships arrived in the harbor, they brought passengers and captains directly to the fort, cutting off outside communications to Nicholson and his council. On 6 June, Nicholson decided to leave for England, and began gathering depositions for use in proceedings there. He left the city on 10 June for the Jersey shore, where he hoped to join Thomas Dongan, who was expected to sail for England soon thereafter. However, it was not until 24 June that he actually managed to sail; he was denied passage on a number of ships, and eventually purchased a share of Dongan's brigantine in order to get away. In the meantime, Leisler proclaimed the rule of William and Mary on 22 June, and on the 28th a provincial committee of safety, acting in the absence of legitimate authority, chose Leisler to be the province's commander-in-chief.

Upon Nicholson's arrival in London in August, he outlined the situation in New York to the king and the Lords of Trade, urging the appointment of a new governor of New York, preferably himself. Despite the efforts of Charles Paulet (now Duke of Bolton) and other patrons, William in November instead chose Colonel Henry Sloughter to be the next governor of New York. The king did, however, acknowledge Nicholson's efforts with the lieutenant governorship of Virginia.

== Virginia and Maryland ==
Nicholson was lieutenant governor of Virginia until 1692, serving under the absentee Governor Lord Howard of Effingham. During this tenure, he was instrumental in the creation of the College of William and Mary and named as one of its original trustees. He worked to improve the provincial militia, and approved the establishment of additional ports of trade in the province. The latter was not without some opposition from some of the larger merchants in the province, who saw the additional ports as a competitive threat. During this time Nicholson was one of the only high-level representatives of Crown Rule in the colonies: most Crown Rule had been eliminated in the northern colonies, and the other southern colonies were governed by proprietary governors. Nicholson recommended to the King that, in order to better establish a common social order and a coordinated defense, Crown Rule should be established over all of the colonies as quickly as possible, including the conversion of the proprietary colonies to crown colonies.

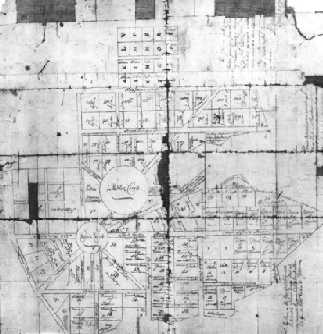
The earliest known map of Annapolis, a 1743 copy of a 1718 map

Lord Effingham resigned the Virginia governorship in February 1692, beginning a contest between Nicholson and Andros for the Virginia governorship. Andros, who was in London and was a more senior figure, was awarded the post, much to Nicholson's annoyance. The episode deepened a growing dislike between the two men. One contemporary chronicler wrote that Nicholson "especially [resented] Sir Edmund Andros, against whom he has a particular pique on account of some earlier dealings", and Nicholson, placated with the lieutenant governorship of Maryland, worked from then on to unseat Andros. When Andros arrived in September 1692, Nicholson graciously received him before sailing for London.

Nicholson was still in England in 1693 when Maryland Governor, Sir Lionel Copley died. Under provisions of his commission, and at the request of the Maryland governor's council, Andros went to Maryland in September 1693 to organize affairs, and again in May 1694 to preside over the provincial court. For these services he was paid £500. When Nicholson, now appointed governor of Maryland, arrived in July, he found the provincial treasury empty, and testily demanded that Andros return the payment. Andros refused, and Nicholson appealed to the Lords of Trade. They ruled in October 1696 that Andros had to return £300. By this time, Nicholson was living in the house of Edward Dorsey.

Nicholson, a committed Anglican as a member of the Church of England, sought to reduce Roman Catholic influence in the Maryland government, and moved the old colonial capital from the Catholic stronghold of St. Mary's City in southern Maryland's St. Mary's County along the Potomac River to what was then called "Anne Arundel's Town" (also known briefly as "Providence"), which was later renamed "Annapolis" in honour of the future monarch, Princess Anne. He chose its site and laid out the plan for the town, placing the Anglican (later Episcopal church and the state house in well-designed public spaces (known later as "State Circle" and "Church Circle") and the use of diagonal avenues to connect various parts of the town (foreseeing details of Pierre L'Enfant's, (1754–1825), plan for the National Capital or "Federal City" in Washington and the District of Columbia, a century later. Architectural historian Mark Childs describes Annapolis, along with Williamsburg, Virginia, which Nicholson also laid out during his later tenure there, as some of the best-designed towns in the British Empire.

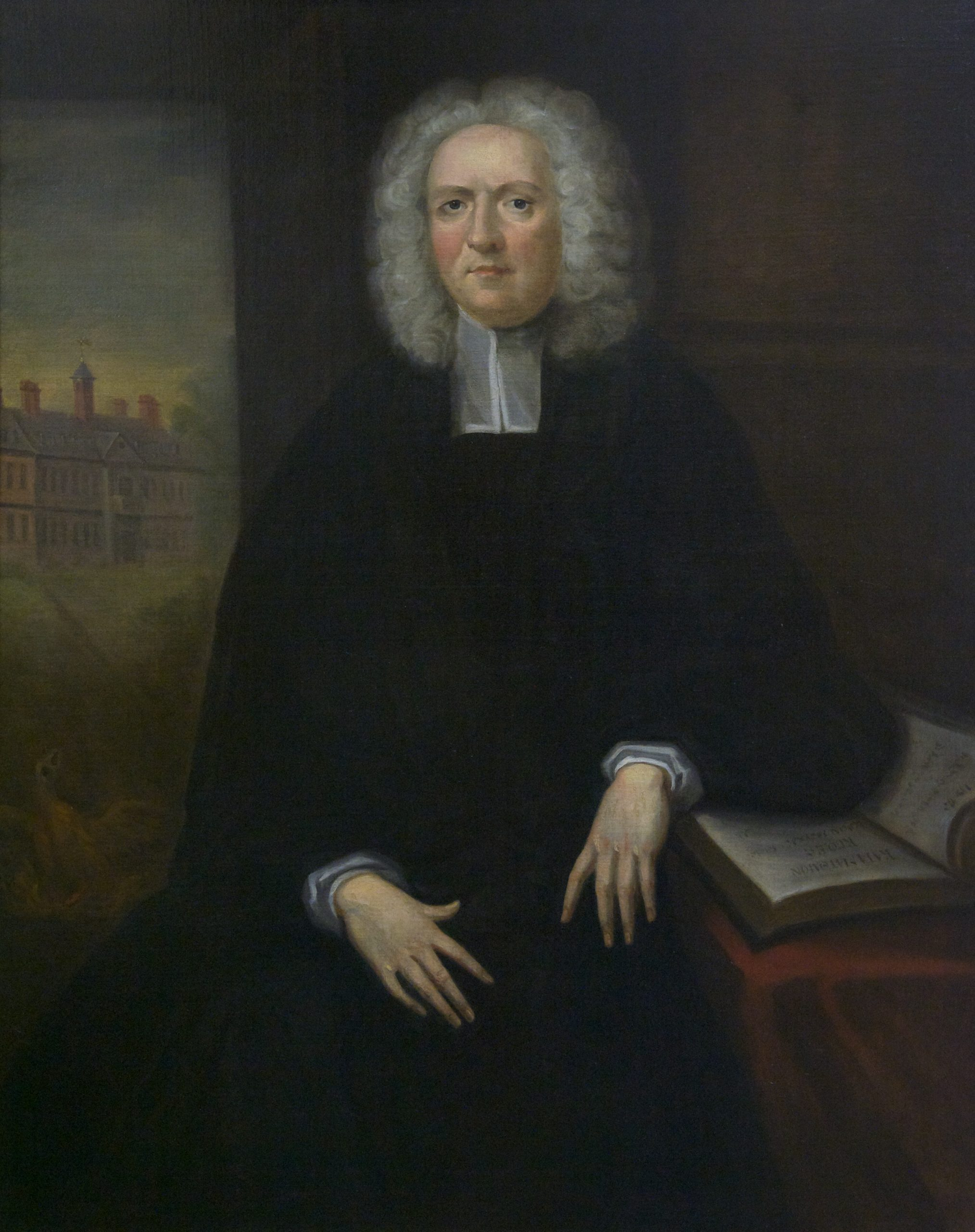
James Blair, whose efforts to found the College of William and Mary Nicholson supported

Nicholson was a supporter of public education, promoting laws to support it, and funded the construction of "King William's School" (which was later incorporated into St. John's College). He became embroiled in a dispute with William Penn from the Middle Atlantic colony to the north, over how to deal with the issue of piracy. In Maryland, Nicholson vigorously cracked down on the practices of some colonists to tolerate pirates, who brought goods and hard currency into the provinces. Aware that Penn's governor William Markham was similarly tolerant (he was said to be taking bribes to allow pirates such as Thomas Day to trade in Pennsylvania), Nicholson ordered that ships destined for Pennsylvania be stopped and searched in Maryland waters, and collected duties if they were carrying European finished goods. Penn protested to the Board of Trade, and the dispute subsided when Nicholson moderated his tactics. During Nicholson's rule in Maryland, he specifically denied that the colonists had the Rights of Englishmen, writing that "if I had not hampered them [colonial interests] in Maryland, and kept them under, I should never have been able to govern them." His feud with pirates took a personal turn when in 1700 he accompanied the captain of HMS Shoreham in a fierce all-day battle against French pirate Louis Guittar. The defeated pirates asked Nicholson for quarter and pardon; he granted them quarter but referred them to King William III of England for mercy, in whose courts Guittar and his crew were all sentenced to hang.

Nicholson's feud with Andros persisted, and Nicholson acquired a powerful ally in James Blair, the founder of the College of William and Mary. The two were able to gain the support of the Anglican establishment in England against Andros, and filed a long list of complaints with the Lords of Trade. These efforts were successful in convincing Andros to request permission to resign, and in December 1698, Nicholson was given the governorship of Virginia. Andros angrily refused to give Nicholson his records. During his term, which lasted until 1705, Nicholson was largely at the mercy of his council, which was dominated by a small group of powerful Virginia families. The Andros rule had been so unpopular in Virginia that Nicholson's instructions gave him little leeway in acting without their consent. At one point Nicholson characterized the Virginia council as "mere brutes who understand not manners". Nicholson made a number of unsuccessful attempts to alter the balance of power, including moving the provincial capital from Jamestown to Middle Plantation, which was renamed Williamsburg. Although he was opposed by the upper house, the colonial legislature was generally supportive of him, and he continued to be favored by the London government.

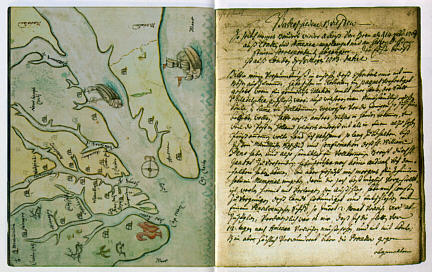
A 1702 map showing Williamsburg, Virginia

Nicholson was exposed to French activities on the Mississippi River while governor of Maryland. He warned the Board of Trade in 1695 that the French were working to complete the designs of explorer Robert La Salle to gain control of the river and dominate the Indian relations in the interior, which "may be of fatal consequence" to the English colonies. He reiterated the warning in a 1698 report, and suggested that the Board of Trade issue instructions to all of the governors encouraging the development of trade with Indians across the Appalachian Mountains. "I am afraid", he wrote, "that now please God, there is a peace, the French will be able to doe more dammage to these Countrys, than they were able to doe in the [King William's] War ." These observations were among the earliest anyone made concerning the threat French expansion posed to the English, and some of his suggestions were ultimately adopted as policy. He actively promoted the idea of expansionist trade on the frontier with other colonial governors, including Bellomont of New York, and Blake of South Carolina.

Following a political crisis in England and the accession of Queen Anne to the throne in 1702, a Tory ministry emerged that sidelined most of Nicholson's Whig patrons. Despite his best efforts to retain his post, he was recalled and replaced in 1705 by Edward Nott. He returned to London, where he was active in the Society for the Propagation of the Gospel in Foreign Parts, and was awarded membership in the Royal Society for his scientific observations of North America. He also acted as a consultant to the Board of Trade, and thus maintained an awareness of colonial issues.

== Queen Anne's War ==
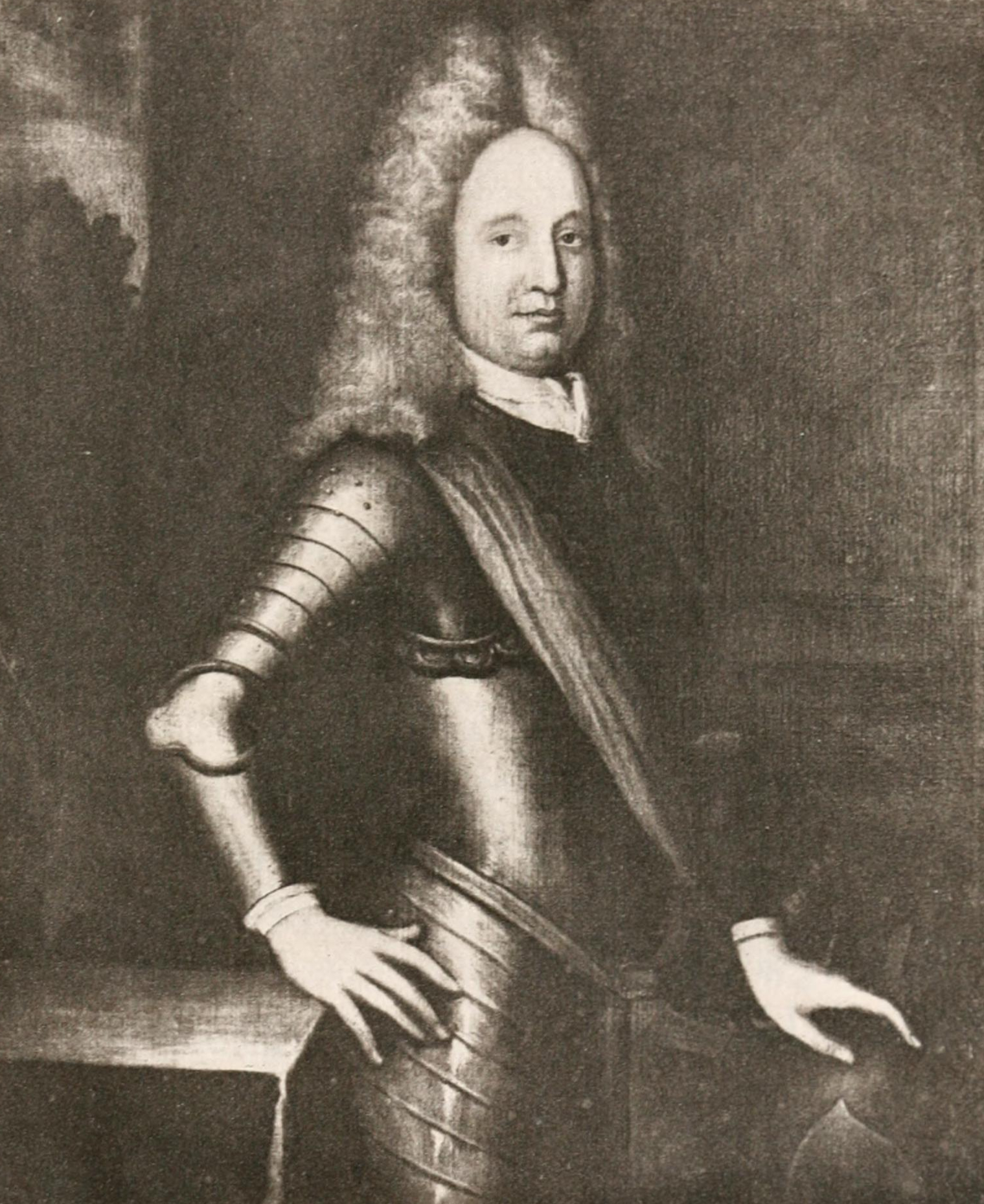
Samuel Vetch, whom Nicholson worked with during the war before turning against him afterward

During King William's War in the 1690s Nicholson asked the House of Burgesses to appropriate money for New York's defense, since it was threatened from New France and acted as a buffer to protect Virginia. The Burgesses refused, even after Nicholson appealed to London. When Queen Anne's War broke out in 1702, Nicholson lent New York £900 of his own money, with the expectation that it would be repaid from Virginia's quit rents (it was not). The publicity of this scheme increased dislike of him in Virginia, and may have played a role in his recall. Virginia was not militarily affected by the war. These efforts by Nicholson to gain broader colonial support for the war were followed by larger proposals to London, suggesting, for example, that all of the colonies be joined under a single viceroy, who would have power of taxation and control of a standing army. According to historian John Fiske, Nicholson was one of the first people to propose uniting all of the North American colonies in this way.

In the course of the ten-year conflict in North America now known as Queen Anne's War, Samuel Vetch, a Scottish businessman with interests in New York and New England, came to London during the winter of 1708–9 and proposed to the Queen and the Board of Trade a major assault on New France. He recruited Nicholson to join the effort, which was to include a sea-based attack on Quebec with Royal Navy support, and a land-based expedition to ascend the Hudson River, descend Lake Champlain, and attack Montreal. Nicholson was given command of the land-based effort while Vetch was to command the provincial militia of New England that were to accompany the fleet. Arriving in Boston in April 1709 Nicholson and Vetch immediately began raising the forces and supplies needed for these operations. Nicholson was able to draw on his earlier connections to New York's aristocracy to recruit the needed forces from there, with additional units coming from New Jersey and Connecticut. He raised a force of about 1,500 regulars and provincial militia and 600 Iroquois, and in June began the construction of three major encampments between Stillwater, just north of Albany, and the southern end of Lake Champlain, while awaiting word of the fleet's arrival in Boston. The expedition turned out to be a disaster. Many men became sick and died from the poor conditions in the camps as the summer dragged on without any news of the fleet. Supplies ran short the men became mutinous and began deserting. Finally, in October Nicholson learned that, due to circumstances in Europe, the fleet's participation had been canceled in July. By this time the men were deserting by whole units and destroyed all of the fortifications and stores.

In the aftermath of the debacle Nicholson returned to London, taking four Indian chiefs with him, and petitioned Queen Anne for permission to lead a more limited expedition against Port Royal, the capital of French Acadia. The Queen granted the petition, and Nicholson was in charge of the forces that captured Port Royal on 2 October 1710. This battle marked the conquest of Acadia, and began permanent British control over the territory they called Nova Scotia. Nicholson published an account of the expedition in his 1711 Journal of an Expedition for the Reduction of Port Royal. The victorious Nicholson returned to England to petition Queen Anne for another expedition to capture the center of New France, Quebec. The resulting naval expedition was led by Admiral Hovenden Walker, and Nicholson led an associated land expedition that retraced the route he had taken in 1709 toward Lake Champlain. Many ships of Walker's fleet foundered on rocks near the mouth of the Saint Lawrence River, and the whole expedition was cancelled, much to Nicholson's anger; he was reported to tear off his wig and throw it to the ground when he heard the news.

== Nova Scotia and South Carolina ==
Nicholson returned to London after the failed expedition, and began working to acquire for himself the governorship of Nova Scotia. After the 1710 victory, Samuel Vetch had become its governor, but his rule over the colony (where he only really controlled Port Royal itself) was somewhat ineffective. Vetch and the Tory ministry then in power disagreed on how to handle affairs, especially with respect to the resident French Catholic population, and Nicholson capitalized on these complaints. In a dispute marked by bitterness and sometimes extreme accusations (Vetch, for example, accused Nicholson of Jacobite sympathies), Nicholson was awarded the post in October 1712. His commission also included the governorship of Placentia, and authority as auditor of all colonial accounts. He only spent a few weeks in Port Royal in 1714, leaving most of the governance to lieutenant governor Thomas Caulfeild. These few weeks were marked by discord with the Acadians, who sought to capitalize on the change of governor to gain concessions Nicholson was not prepared to give. Nicholson also issued order restricting the interaction between the troops and the town, resulting in the further reduction of already-poor morale in the Port Royal garrison. He also cracked down on open trade between British colonial merchants and the French, requiring the licensing of any British merchant wanting to trade at French ports.

Nicholson spent most of his time as Nova Scotia governor in Boston, where he devoted a significant amount of time investigating Vetch's finances. Vetch interpreted Nicholson's hostile and intrusive examination of his affairs as a largely partisan attempt to smear him. He called Nicholson a "malicious madman" who would do anything that "fury, malice, and madness could inspire." Nicholson attempted to prevent Vetch from sailing for England where he might better defend himself, forcing Vetch to flee beyond Nicholson's reach to New London, Connecticut, in order to get a ship for England. With the accession of George I to the throne and the change to a Whig ministry, Vetch succeeded in clearing his name and recovered his post from Nicholson, who was accused by Vetch and others of neglecting the province.

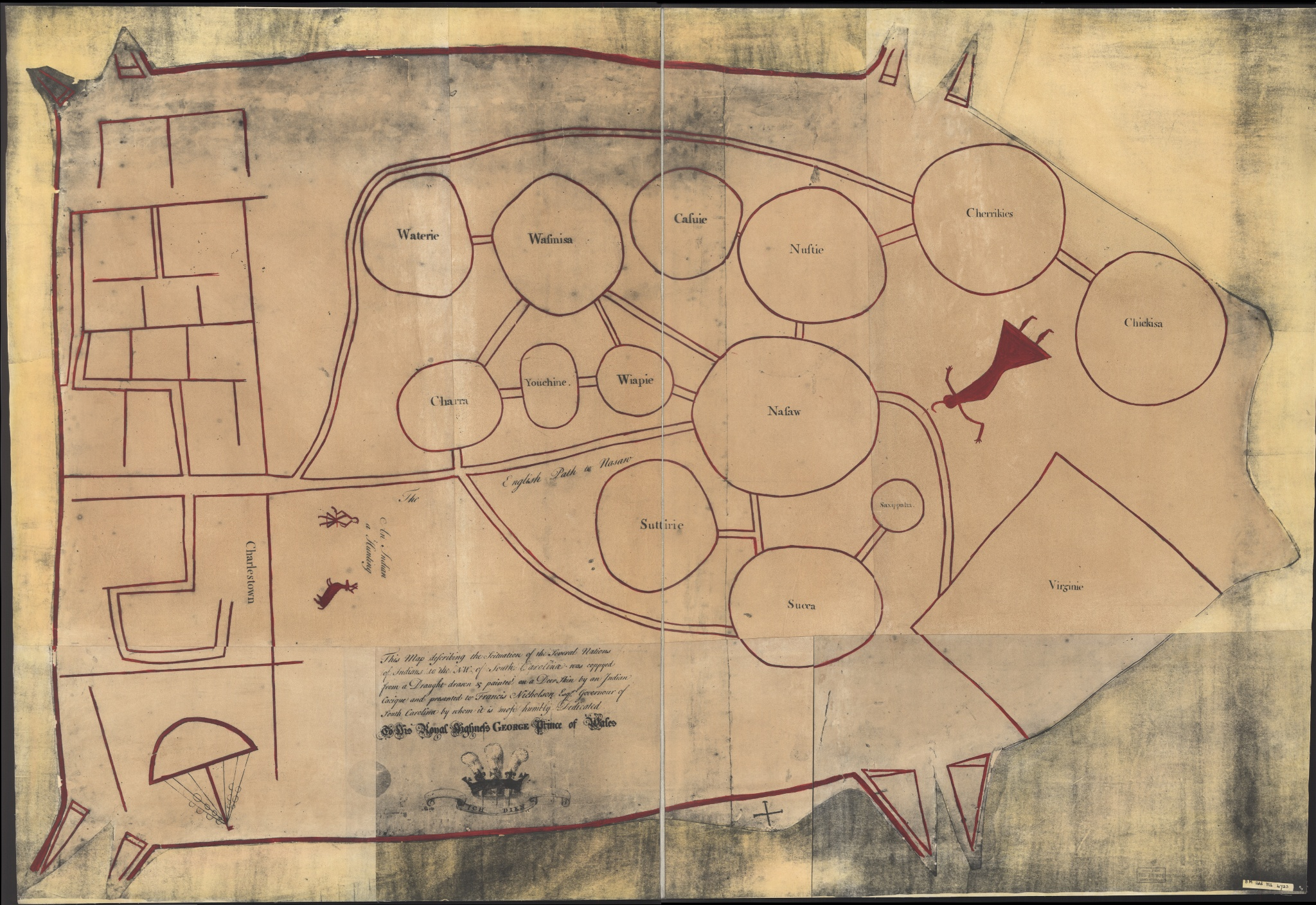
Map made in 1721 by a Catawba chief and given to Nicholson. Charleston is to the left, the circles represent distinct tribes or clans, and the lines between them represent connections between those groups.

Nicholson next served as the first royal governor of South Carolina from 1721 to 1725. The colonists had rebelled against the rule of the proprietors, and Nicholson was appointed in response to their request for crown governance. The rebellion had been prompted by inadequate response by the proprietors to Indian threats, so Nicholson brought with him some British troops. He established a council composed primarily of supporters of the rebellion, and gave it significant latitude to control colonial affairs. As he had in some of his other posts, he used enforcement of the Navigation Acts as a means to crack down on political opposition. He established local governments modeled on those he set up in Maryland and Virginia, including the 1722 incorporation of Charleston. He expended both public money and his own to further both education and the Church of England, and introduced ground-breaking judicial administration into the colony. He negotiated agreements and territorial boundaries with the Cherokee, and promoted trade, pursuing policies similar to those he had advocated while in Maryland and Virginia. He introduced a commissioner of Indian affairs into the colonial government, a post that survived until the crown assumed the duties of managing Indian affairs in the 1750s.

Like other colonies, South Carolina suffered from chronic shortages of currency, and issued bills of credit to compensate. During Nicholson's administration this was done several times, but the inflationary consequences did not reach crisis proportions until after he left the colony. It did, however, anger merchant interests enough to raise complaints against him with the Board of Trade. Combined with long-running but false accusations by William Rhett and other supporters of the proprietors that Nicholson was improperly engaged in smuggling, he felt the need to return to England to defend himself against these charges. He returned to London in 1725, carrying with him Cherokee baskets that became part of the earliest collections in the British Museum.

== Personal and later life ==
Nicholson courted the teenage Lucy Burwell of the Burwell family of Virginia at the turn of the 18th century. Burwell, known for her beauty and charm, did not reciprocate his feelings. Nicholson continued to press Burwell and her parents for the match he desired. Instead, Burwell looked for love and affection of a man of good manners with whom she was compatible. Nicholson's behavior, along with his unpopular policies, drove four Burwell relatives and two others to petition Anne, Queen of Great Britain for Nicholson's removal as governor. Titled "Memorial Concerning the Maladministration of Governor Nicholson", it was signed by six councilors John Blair, Benjamin Harrison, Robert Carter, Matthew Page, Philip Ludwell, and John Lightfoot. She married Edmund Berkeley, a successful planter.

In England, Nicholson was promoted to lieutenant-general. He never married, and died in London on 5/16 March 1728/9. He was buried in the parish of St George Hanover Square. A claim cited in some 19th-century biographies that he was knighted turned out to be false when his will was discovered early in the 20th century.

== Personality ==
Nicholson was notorious for his temper. He was, according to historian George Waller, "subject to fits of passion". In one story, an Indian said of Nicholson, "The general is drunk." When informed that Nicholson did not partake of strong drink, the Indian replied, "I do not mean that he is drunk with rum, he was born drunk." Waller also points out that his "hasty and overmastering temper led him into great excesses".

== Legacy ==
Nicholson Hall of the College of William and Mary is named in honour of Francis Nicholson. Additionally the two main streets of Colonial Williamsburg, one block north and south of the central street (Duke of Gloucester St.) are named Francis and Nicholson, in his honour.

== Notes ==
Government offices
New office	Lieutenant Governor of the Dominion of New England; 1688–1689	Office abolished
Preceded by Nathaniel Bacon; Acting	Lieutenant Governor of Virginia; 1690–1692	Succeeded by Sir Edmund Andros
Preceded by Thomas Lawrence	Governor of Maryland; 1694–1698	Succeeded by Nathaniel Blakiston
Preceded by George Hamilton	Governor of Virginia; 1698–1705	Succeeded by Edward Nott
Preceded by Samuel Vetch	Governor of Nova Scotia; 1712–1715 with Thomas Caulfeild (1712–1715)	Succeeded by Samuel Vetch
Preceded by James Moore Jr.	Governor of South Carolina; 1721–1725	Succeeded by Arthur Middleton; Acting
