= 1794 Maryland gubernatorial election =

- November 17, 1794
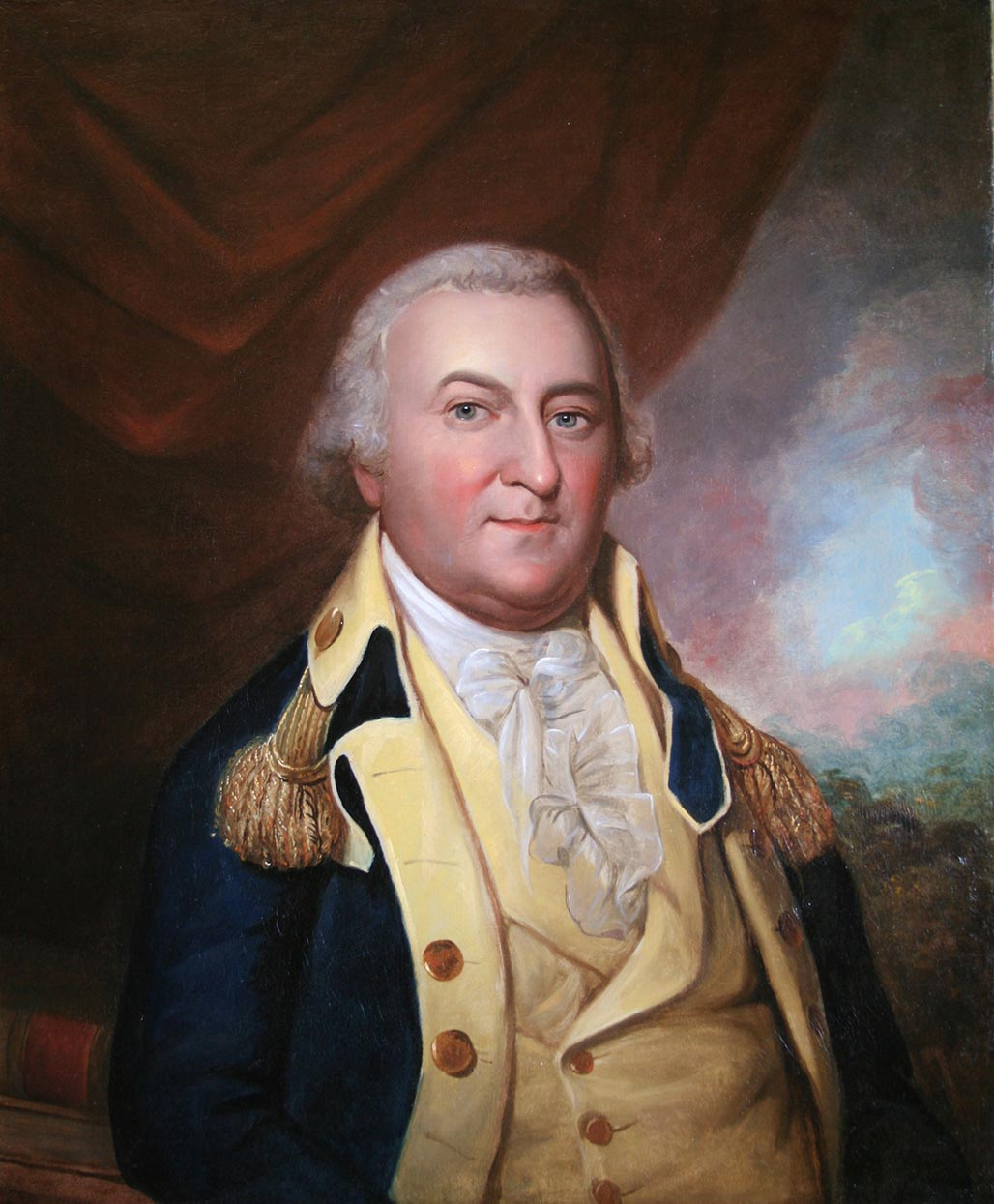

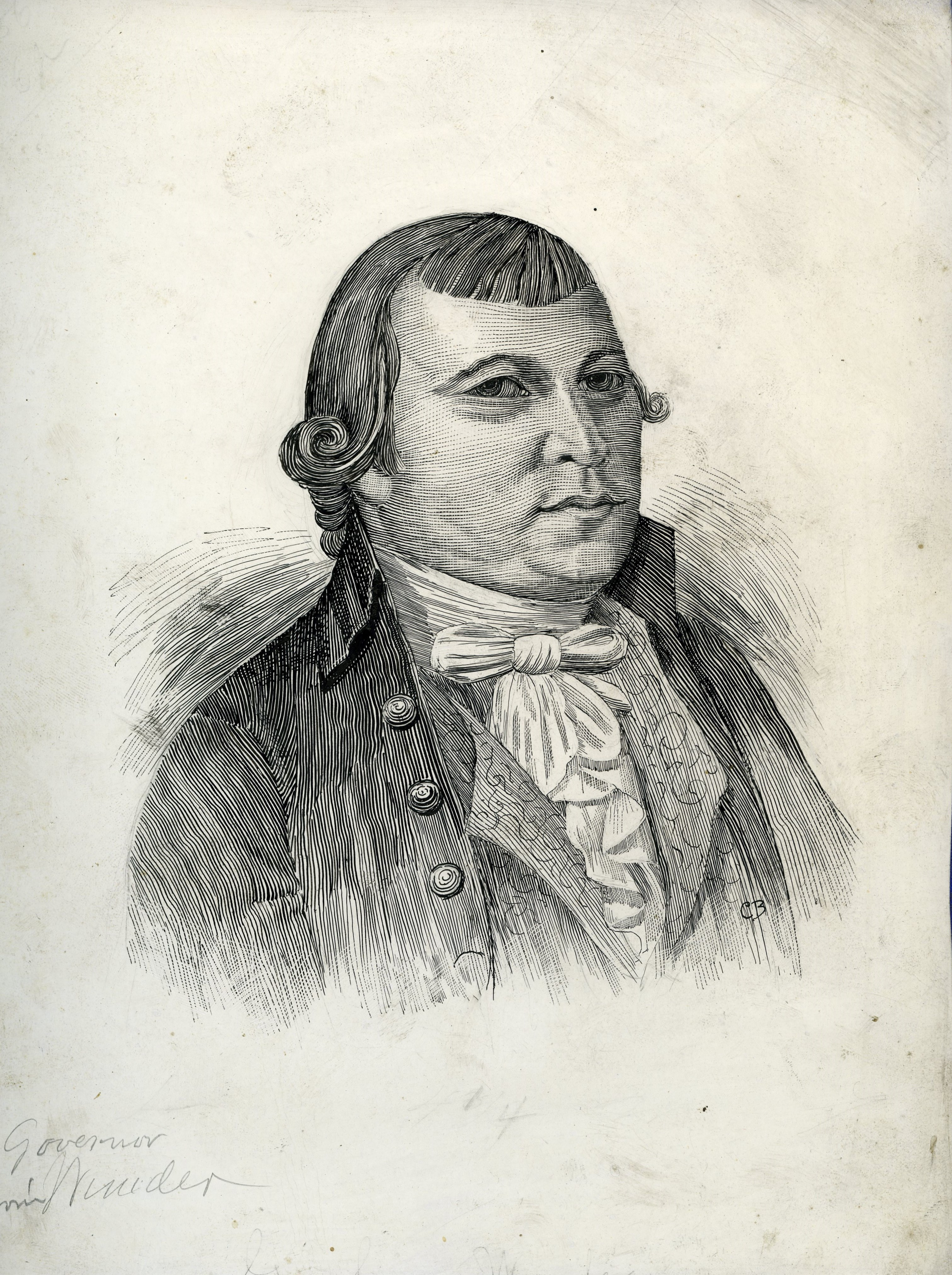
| Nominee | John Hoskins Stone | Levin Winder |
| Party | Federalist | Federalist |
| Popular vote | 1 | 0 |
| Percentage | 100.00% | 0.00% |
Governor before election
Thomas Sim Lee
Federalist
Elected Governor
John Hoskins Stone
Federalist

The 1794 Maryland gubernatorial election was held on November 17, 1794, in order to elect the Governor of Maryland. Federalist candidate and former member of the Maryland House of Delegates John Hoskins Stone was elected by the Maryland General Assembly against his opponent, fellow Federalist candidate Levin Winder. The exact results of this election are unknown.

== General election ==
On election day, November 17, 1794, Federalist candidate John Hoskins Stone was elected by the Maryland General Assembly, thereby retaining Federalist control over the office of governor. Stone was sworn in as the 7th Governor of Maryland on November 24, 1794.

=== Results ===
Maryland gubernatorial election, 1794
| Party | Candidate | Votes | % |
|---|---|---|---|
| Federalist | John Hoskins Stone | 1 | 100.00 |
| Federalist | Levin Winder | 0 | 0.00 |
| Total votes | | 1 | 100.00 |
| Federalist hold | | | |
