= Maryland Route 223 =

State highway in Maryland, United States

Maryland Route 223
- Maryland Route 223 highlighted in red

Route information
- Maintained by MDSHA
- Length: 12.63 mi (20.33 km)
- Existed: 1927–present

Major junctions
- South end: Dead end in Piscataway
- MD 5 in Clinton; MD 4 in Melwood
- North end: Mellwood Road in Melwood

Location
- Country: United States
- State: Maryland
- Counties: Prince George's

Highway system
- Maryland highway system; Interstate; US; State; Scenic Byways
← MD 222	→ MD 224

Maryland Route 223 (MD 223) is a state highway in the U.S. state of Maryland. The state highway runs 12.65 miles (20.36 km) from a dead end near Livingston Road in Piscataway north to Mellwood Road in Melwood. MD 223 passes through suburban areas of southern Prince George's County, including the community of Woodyard south of Andrews Air Force Base between MD 5 in Clinton and MD 4 in Melwood. The highway was constructed from Clinton to near Piscataway in the 1920s and early 1930s. MD 223 was extended west to Livingston Road in Piscataway and east to MD 4 in the mid-1950s. MD 223's interchanges with MD 4 and MD 5 were built in the mid-1960s and early 1990s, respectively.

== Route description ==
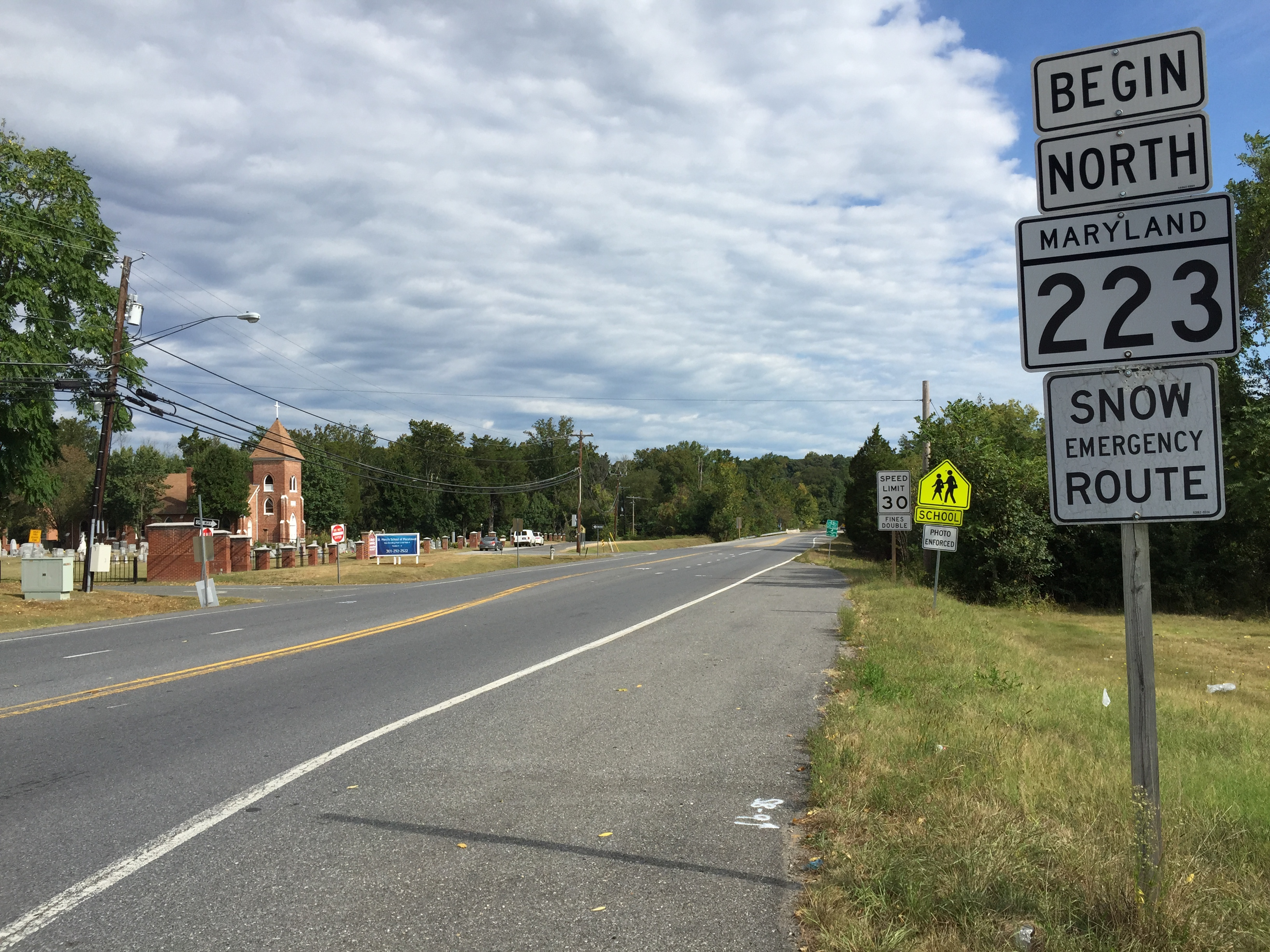
The signed beginning of northbound MD 223 at Floral Park Road in Piscataway. The actual southern terminus is further southwest along Floral Park Road.

MD 223 begins at a dead end next to a barrier adjacent to county-maintained Livingston Road. The state highway heads northeast as two-lane undivided Floral Park Road. MD 223 turns north onto Piscataway Road at the four-way intersection with that highway; Floral Park Road continues east toward Brandywine. Piscataway Road is used to access Livingston Road from MD 223. The state highway crosses Piscataway Creek and continues northeast through a mix of forest and residential subdivisions. MD 223 intersects Tippett Road, which heads south toward the historic home Wyoming, southeast of the Washington Executive Airport. The state highway expands to a four-lane undivided highway as it enters Clinton, where the highway passes north of Surrattsville High School and the Surratt House Museum and intersects the old alignment of MD 5, which heads north as Old Branch Avenue and south as Brandywine Road. MD 223 enters a commercial area and expands to a divided highway around its single-point urban interchange with MD 5 (Branch Avenue).

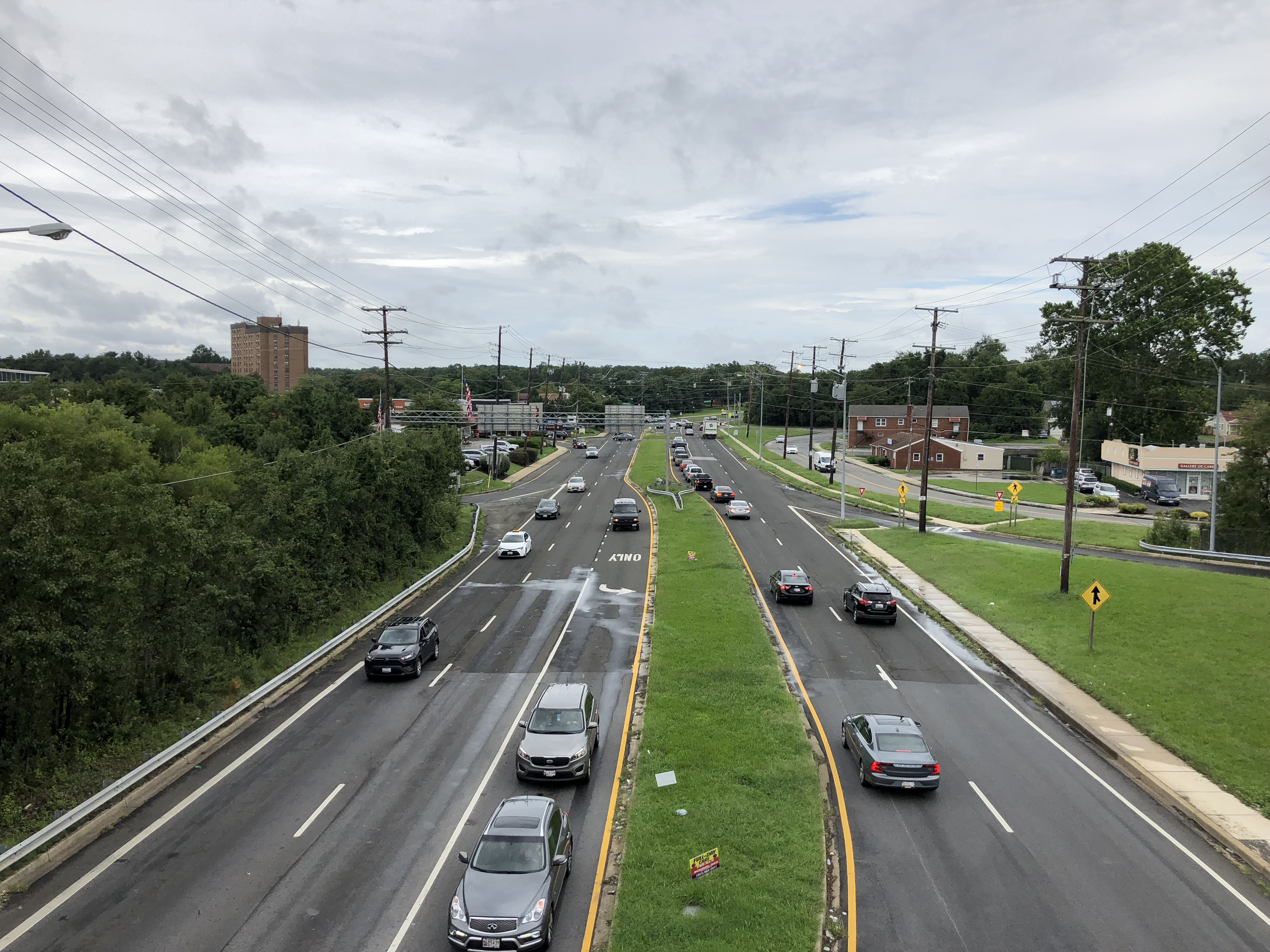
View north along MD 223 from MD 5 in Clinton

MD 223 continues east from MD 5 as two-lane Woodyard Road. The state highway intersects Dangerfield Road and Old Alexandria Ferry Road in the hamlet of Coles Corner. MD 223 continues east to the community of Woodyard, where the highway passes the historic home His Lordship's Kindness and crosses the upper reaches of Piscataway Creek. MD 223 turns north to continue on Woodyard Road at its intersection with Rosaryville Road, which heads southeast toward the village of Rosaryville and Rosaryville State Park. The state highway gradually curves to the north through the community of Melwood. MD 223 expands to a four-lane divided highway right before its intersection with the old alignment of MD 4, Marlboro Pike. The state highway, now named Mellwood Road, meets MD 4 (Pennsylvania Avenue) at a partial cloverleaf interchange, then immediately intersects Old Marlboro Pike, which leads east to the historic home Melwood Park. MD 223 reaches its northern terminus immediately to the north where Mellwood Road rapidly reduces from a divided highway to a very narrow, forest-lined, two-lane undivided county highway.

MD 223 is a part of the National Highway System as a principal arterial from its southern terminus to MD 4.

== History ==
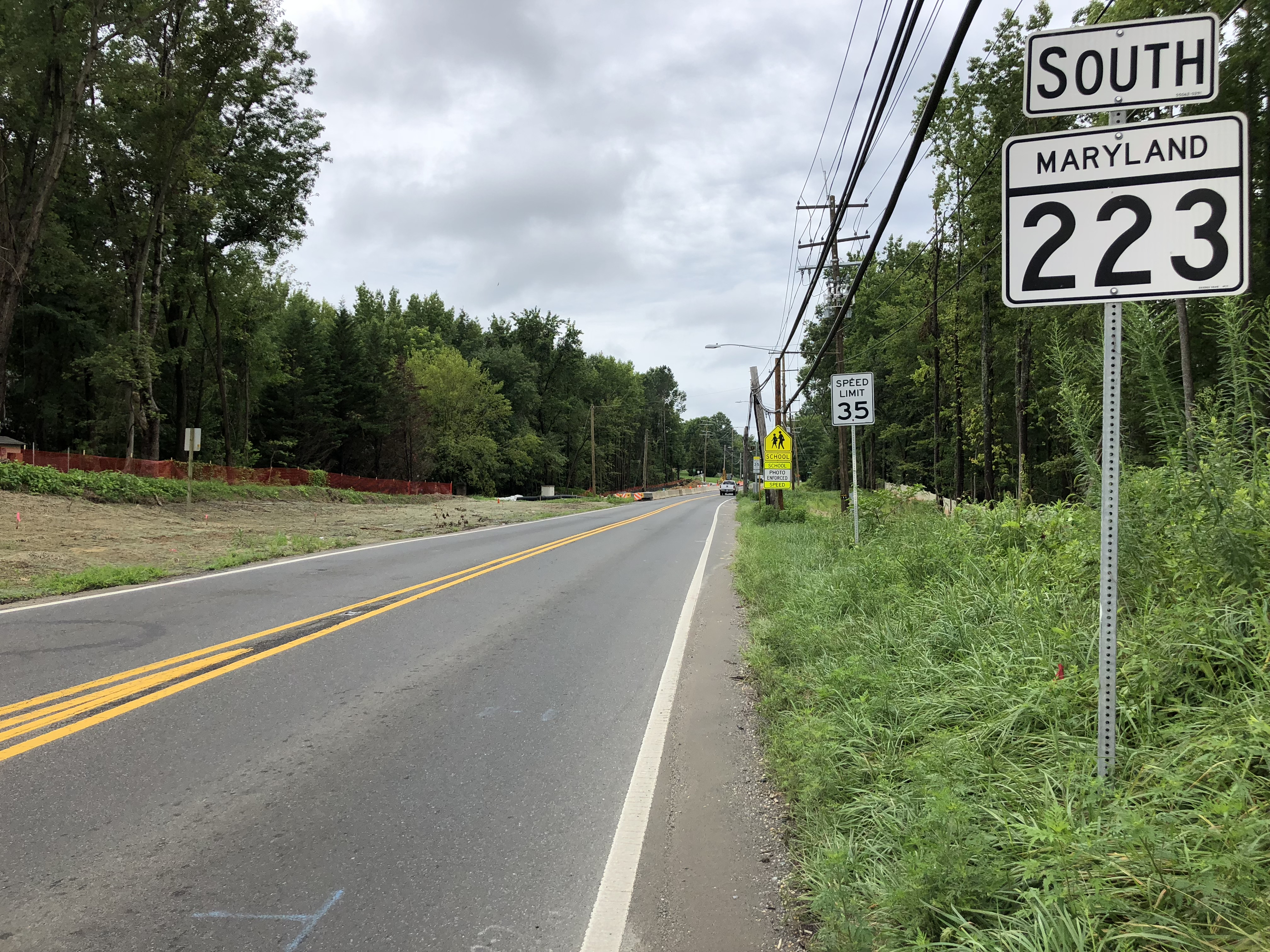
MD 223 southbound in Melwood

The first section of what became MD 223 was improved as a gravel road from the Southern Maryland Road (now Old Branch Avenue) in Clinton southwest to Steed Road by 1921. The gravel road was extended to southwest of Tippett Road in 1924. The portion of Piscataway Road between the west end of MD 223 and Livingston Road, which was constructed as MD 224, was improved as a county highway by 1930. MD 223 was extended southwest to Parker Lane northeast of Piscataway in 1933. In 1947 and 1948, the portion of Woodyard Road between MD 4 (now Marlboro Pike) and Dower House Road, then still a county highway, was improved as a gravel road. MD 223 was extended on both ends in 1955. On the west, the highway was extended southwest to Livingston Road, which ceased to be part of MD 224 the same year. On the east, the highway was extended northeast along Woodyard Road from Clinton to MD 4 (now Marlboro Pike) at Melwood.

When the MD 4 freeway was completed through Melwood in 1964, MD 223 was extended north along Melwood Road, which was reconstructed as a divided highway, to its present terminus. The highway was expanded to a divided highway on either side of MD 5 in 1989. MD 223's single-point urban interchange with MD 5 was constructed in 1992. Piscataway Road was extended south from Floral Park Road to Livingston Road as a county highway in 2007. In 2011, a barrier was constructed at the western end of MD 223 at Livingston Road, making Floral Park Road a dead end; through traffic now uses the county-maintained portion of Piscataway Road to reach Livingston Road. MD 223 was relocated at its intersection with Rosaryville Road in 2012; this work included a new bridge across the upper reaches of Pisacataway Creek.

== Junction list ==
The entire route is in Prince George's County.

Location	mi	km	Destinations	Notes
Piscataway	0.00	0.00	Dead end	Southern terminus; barrier adjacent to Livingston Road
Piscataway	0.58	0.93	Floral Park Road east / Piscataway Road south to Livingston Road	MD 223 turns north onto Piscataway Road
Clinton	7.41	11.93	MD 5 (Branch Avenue) to US 301 – Washington	Single-point urban interchange
Rosaryville	10.06	16.19	Rosaryville Road south	MD 223 turns north to remain on Woodyard Road
Melwood	12.48	20.08	MD 4 (Pennsylvania Avenue) – Upper Marlboro, Washington	Partial cloverleaf interchange
Melwood	12.63	20.33	Mellwood Road north	Northern terminus; end of state maintenance
1.000 mi = 1.609 km; 1.000 km = 0.621 mi

== Auxiliary routes ==
- MD 223A is the designation for an unnamed 0.10-mile (0.16 km) section of old alignment of MD 223 between the Piscataway Road – Floral Park Road intersection and Piscataway Creek in Piscataway.
- MD 223I is the designation for Haislip Way, which runs 0.06 mi (0.097 km) from MD 223 east to Woodyard Circle, where it continues as county-maintained Heartwood Lane. The route was designated in 2013.
