= Bartholomew Booth =

American education pioneer

Bartholomew Booth (c.1732–1786) was a pioneer in American education. Oxford-educated, Booth was ordained as a priest in the Church of England before becoming a headmaster. He opened academies in Liverpool, then in Lancashire and Essex. He offered a wide curriculum, broadly following the educational philosophy of Benjamin Franklin, and was a curate for what became the congregation of Saint John's Church (Hagerstown, Maryland).

== Early life ==
He was the son of Bartholomew Booth (died 1750), the schoolmaster of the village Mellor, then in Derbyshire. After instruction from his father, he attended Manchester Grammar School, from 1750. He matriculated at Brasenose College, Oxford in 1754, aged 21, but left without taking a degree.

Booth was ordained deacon in 1755, by Edmund Keene. He began teaching in 1756, at Disley. In 1758 he was ordained priest, by Keene, and became a curate at Disley, where he was appointed the schoolmaster in 1760. That year, he was moved to the chaplain post at Marple Chapel.

By this time Booth had a growing family: he had married in 1753 Mary Chatterton of Marple (died 1789), when he was working in a school there as an usher. He now separated from Mary, who was showing signs of mental illness. With two of their sons, he took curacies at St Alkmund's Church, Derby and then Brassington. In 1763 he began a short period as a master at Derby School. He moved on to Liverpool, setting up his own school in 1765.

== Woolton Academy ==
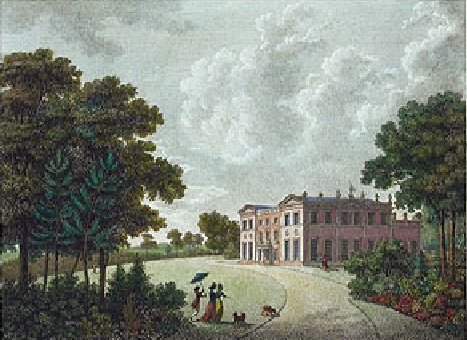
Woolton Hall, near Liverpool, 1781 watercolour after Robert Adam improvements

With the help of patrons, Booth in 1766 began his Woolton Academy. It was a boarding school located in Woolton Hall, outside Liverpool. Pupils there included Isaac Gascoyne and George Hibbert. The patrons were the widow Anne Bardsley (1732–1781) and her sister Mary Valens (1740–1810). They were daughters of the Liverpool merchant Joseph Valens. Initially involved as supporters of Booth's Liverpool school in 1765, they undertook housekeeping duties at the boarding school. Their money enabled Booth to purchase Woolton Hall, in 1771. Whitehead suggests that the Rev. Samuel Bardsley (1726–1756), curate at Flixton, may have been Anne's husband.

Booth took on as assistant master Peter Newby, who taught French and Latin, and was much influenced by Booth's broad-based curriculum. Woolton Academy continued to 1772, when Booth sold Woolton Hall. It went to Nicholas Ashton (1742–1833), from a Liverpool merchant family.

Booth with Newby set up a new school in High Beach, Essex. Two of the sons of Thomas Langton (1724–1794) of Kirkham, Lancashire made the move south as pupils. The masters parted in 1773, Booth moving to British America, and Newby setting up his own school, at Burton-in-Kendal.

== In Maryland ==
Booth emigrated in 1773 to colonial Maryland, leaving his wife Mary in England, in a group with his two elder sons, Robert and William, as well as two wealthy women, Anne Bardsley and Mary Valens. Mary Valens eventually owned land in Maryland, and married Horatio Gates, as his second wife, in 1786.

Initially, Booth had intended to retire from teaching, and become a planter. Instead, the Patriot leadership put pressure on him to develop education. He opened academies on the frontier at The Forest of Needwood outside what is now Burkittsville, Maryland, and then at Delamere, on the Antietam Creek near Hagerstown, Maryland.

Booth became one of three curates assisting the unpopular but politically connected Rev. Bennet Allen at All Saints Church in Frederick, Maryland. He was appointed to Frederick County's Committee of Observation on January 24, 1775, by John Hanson.

From the outbreak in 1776 of the American War of Independence, Boothe found himself in a difficult position. He sympathized with the Patriot cause, and the Maryland Legislature gave permission to set up his Forest of Needwood school, which functioned from 1778 to 1785. On the other hand, Rev. Booth was an Episcopalian cleric, and western Marylanders in particular viewed him with suspicion. To Richard Henry Lee arranging the schooling of nephews, he was the Reverend Mr. Booth; to others "Parson Booth".

Bowing to Middletown Patriots, the group sold the Needwood property in Frederick County. Former Maryland governor Thomas Sim Lee agreed to purchase the Needwood farm and forest in 1783, but the transaction had not been completed by Booth's death, and his son and executor sold the property in 1785 to Mary Valens, which caused litigation not resolved until 1816. Meanwhile, Thomas Sim Lee took possession of the property by either 1790 or 1805, with his son John Lee and enslaved labor farmed, and died there in 1819. Following the conflict, Booth moved west to Washington County, with self-exiled Maryland Tories. The site chosen for the new Delamere academy was the Devil's Backbone on Antietam Creek, adjacent to the old main road from Maryland's eastern counties to the frontier in the Potomac highlands. Anne Bardsley had purchased the land shortly before her death in 1781.

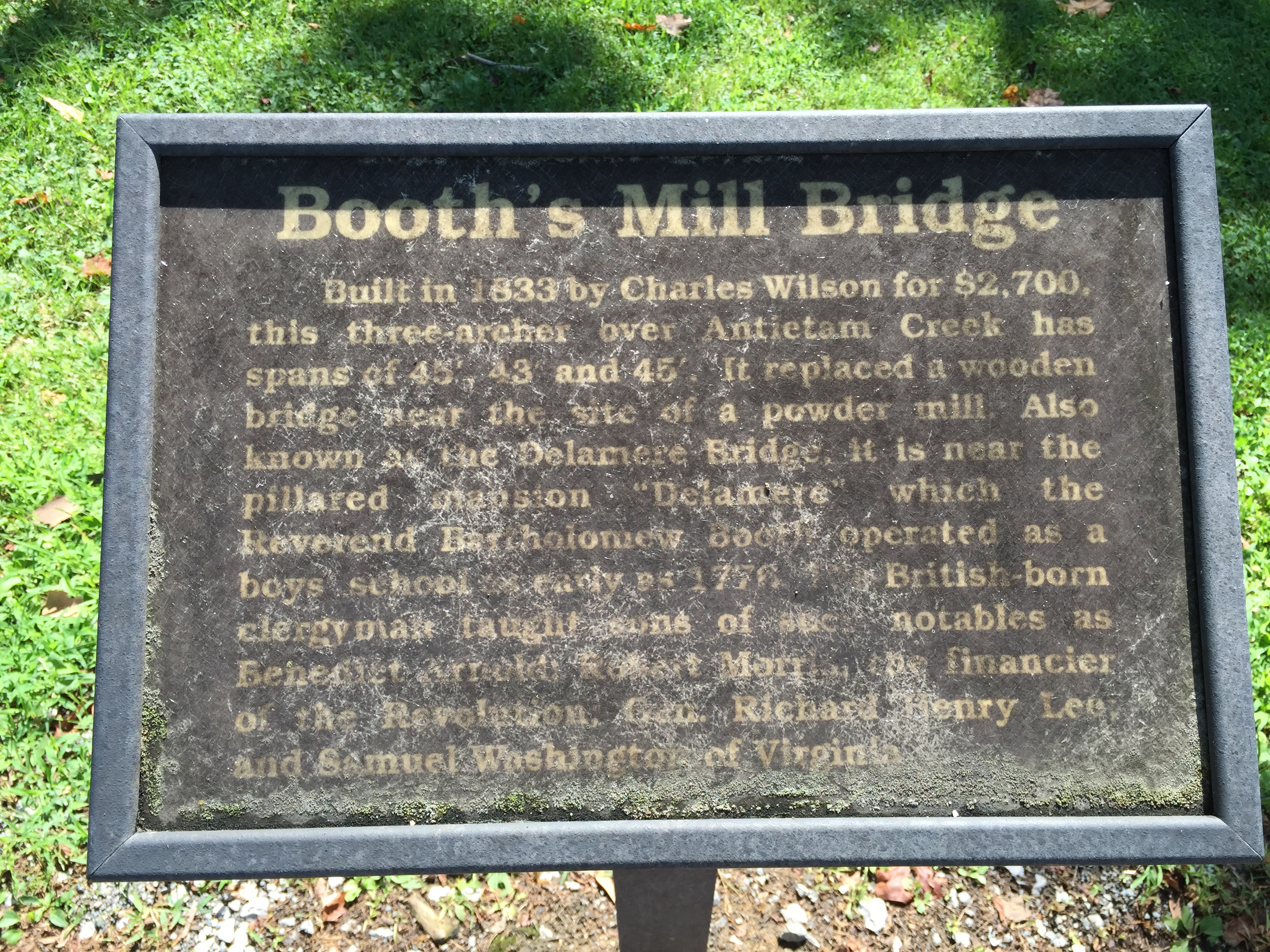
Booth's Mill Bridge notice, commemorating Booth's school and the wooden bridge replaced in 1833

Here Booth built his new home and a mill. The entrance lane to Delamere (Delemere in source), the house, is next to the 19th-century Delemere Bridge over the Creek. Two years before Booth's death in 1786, the taxable land was listed as 1,700 acres (690 ha). Delemere or Delamere references the Booth family of Dunham Massey, the Booth baronets and George Booth, 1st Baron Delamer who was grandson of the first baronet. There is a putative connection to Batholomew Booth.

Parents who sent sons to Booth included Robert Morris, Edward Shippen and Benedict Arnold (sons Benjamin, aged 10, and Richard, aged 11). Bushrod Washington, nephew of George Washington, was a pupil. Needwood School included fencing and dancing in its curriculum.

== Legacy ==
The Needwood and Delamere schools only operated for about a decade, but they launched other educators' careers and advanced Benjamin Franklin's theory of instruction. For example, August Christian Whitehair, born about 1760, graduated from Delamere and settled in modern-day Preston County, West Virginia in 1788, three years after Booth's death. Whitehair studied under Booth and was the first teacher in the Preston County Union District (1790). The History of Preston County notes Whitehair as an educational pioneer within the German settlement.
