= John Lee (Maryland politician) =

American politician

Member of the U.S. House of Representatives from Maryland
- In office March 4, 1823 – March 3, 1825
- Preceded by: John Nelson
- Succeeded by: Thomas Contee Worthington
- Constituency: 4th district

Member of the Maryland Senate representing Maryland's Western shore
- In office 1837

Member of the Maryland House of Representatives representing Frederick County
- In office 1852-1853

Personal details
- Born: January 30, 1788 Needwood, Frederick County, Maryland, U.S.
- Died: May 17, 1871 (Aged 83) New York City, U.S.
- Resting place: New Cathedral Cemetery
- Party: Federalist
- Parent(s): Thomas Sim Lee and Mary Digges Lee
- Education: Harvard University
- Occupation: planter, legislator

John Lee (January 30, 1788 – May 17, 1871) was an American planter and politician who served in both houses of the Maryland legislature as well as a single term in the United States House of Representatives. He was a descendant of the Lee Family of Virginia.

== Early and family life ==
Born either on October 12, 1787, or January 30, 1788 at "Needwood", near Frederick, Maryland. His father, Thomas Sim Lee was a prominent planter, patriot and politician, who had twice served as Maryland's governor and held various other offices. His mother, the former Mary Digges, was also from a prominent Maryland family, but predeceased her husband by 14 years. Lee received a private education appropriate to his class, then traveled to Cambridge, Massachusetts, where he studied law at Harvard University. He also served in the Maryland militia during the War of 1812.

== Career ==
=== Planter ===
Lee did not practice law, but rather primarily managed his estate, "Needwood", which he farmed mostly using enslaved labor, as had his father (who died in 1819). When Thomas Sim Lee died in 1819, this man and his brother William (who lived in Talbot County but became a resident of Cecil County) were named executors, and told to pay the estate's debts, which required negotiations with the Farmers and Mechanics Bank in Frederick. The family's Frederick county property was divided between the two brothers and their sister Eliza (who had married former U.S. Senator Outerbridge Horsey of Delaware and who moved to Maryland sometime after 1819), and directed them to divide those properties amicably. John had been living in the "Old Needwood" house, and received it and several hundred acres. Eliza received 312 acres which became known as the Horsey tract, and William of Talbot County received 271 acres later known as the pry property as well as 144 acres known as the "Forest of Needwood". Their father's 18 Georgetown lots (on Needwood Street) were bequeathed brother Thomas and grandchildren (by him as well as by his daughter/sister Mary L. Ringgold). Ultimately, John had difficulty paying the debt assessment and mortgaged the property, receiving only life estates in their Needwood property.

In the 1830 federal census, his household also included two free elderly Black men and two free middle-aged Black women, as well as 55 enslaved Blacks. and also rented out two enslaved people elsewhere in Frederick County. In the 1850 federal census, John Lee owned 36 enslaved people in Frederick county, and 30 enslaved people in the last census before the American Civil War. In 1843, his son, named like this man's father Thomas Sim Lee, built a mansion at Needwood, now in Burkittsville, Maryland, that is eligible for inclusion on the National Register for Historic Places.

=== Politician ===
Meanwhile, decades earlier, following his father's death, Lee began his own political career. He won election as a Jackson Federalist to the Eighteenth Congress (March 4, 1823 – March 3, 1825). He served as chairman of the committee of the House of Representatives appointed to escort the Marquis de Lafayette from Frederick City to Washington in 1825.

Later, Lee served as member of the Maryland Senate in 1837 and still later represented Federick County in the Maryland House of Delegates (1852-1853). He advocated for the Chesapeake and Ohio Canal, which was built in the 1830s, and later for the Baltimore and Ohio Railroad, which superseded it. When Lee retired from public life, he resumed management of his estate.

== Personal life ==
He married Harriet Carroll, whose father Charles Carroll and mother the former Harriett Chew also came from distinguished Maryland families. They had two sons who lived to adulthood. Charles Carroll Lee and Thomas Sim Lee. Their daughter Mary Digges Lee married her distant cousin Charles Carroll and one of their sons, John Lee Carroll became Maryland's governor in 1876.

== Death and legacy ==
He died on May 17, 1871, while on a visit to his son in New York City, and is interred in New Cathedral Cemetery, familiarly called "Bonnie Brae," in Baltimore, Maryland.

U.S. House of Representatives
| Preceded by John Nelson | Member of the U.S. House of Representatives from Maryland's 4th congressional district 1823–1825 | Succeeded by Thomas Contee Worthington |
