= SS Thomas Sim Lee =

Liberty ship of WWII

History

United States
- Name: Thomas Sim Lee
- Namesake: Thomas Sim Lee
- Owner: War Shipping Administration (WSA)
- Operator: Agwilines Inc.
- Ordered: as type (EC2-S-C1) hull, MCE hull 921
- Awarded: 1 January 1942
- Builder: Bethlehem-Fairfield Shipyard, Baltimore, Maryland
- Cost: $1,059,986
- Yard number: 2071
- Way number: 13
- Laid down: 23 September 1942
- Launched: 24 October 1942
- Sponsored by: Miss Jean Elizabeth O'Donovan Lee (1930- )
- Completed: 31 October 1942
- Identification: Call sign: KHJU
- Fate: Laid up in National Defense Reserve Fleet, Beaumont, Texas, 23 April 1952; Sold for scrapping, 9 June 1972, removed from fleet, 7 July 1972

General characteristics
- Class & type: Liberty ship; type EC2-S-C1, standard
- Tonnage: 10,865 LT DWT; 7,176 GRT
- Displacement: 3,380 long tons (3,434 t) (light); 14,245 long tons (14,474 t) (max)
- Length: 441 feet 6 inches (135 m) oa; 416 feet (127 m) pp; 427 feet (130 m) lwl
- Beam: 57 feet (17 m)
- Draft: 27 ft 9.25 in (8.4646 m)
- Installed power: 2 × Oil fired 450 °F (232 °C) boilers, operating at 220 psi (1,500 kPa); 2,500 hp (1,900 kW)
- Propulsion: 1 × triple-expansion steam engine, (manufactured by Worthington Pump & Machinery Corp, Harrison, New Jersey); 1 × screw propeller
- Speed: 11.5 knots (21.3 km/h; 13.2 mph)
- Capacity: 562,608 cubic feet (15,931 m^{3}) (grain); 499,573 cubic feet (14,146 m^{3}) (bale)
- Complement: 38–62 USMM; 21–40 USNAG
- Armament: Varied by ship; Bow-mounted 3-inch (76 mm)/50-caliber gun; Stern-mounted 4-inch (102 mm)/50-caliber gun; 2–8 × single 20-millimeter (0.79 in) Oerlikon anti-aircraft (AA) cannons and/or, 2–8 × 37-millimeter (1.46 in) M1 AA guns

SS Thomas Sim Lee was a Liberty ship built in the United States during World War II. She was named after Thomas Sim Lee, an American planter and statesman of Frederick County, Maryland. He was the second Governor of Maryland, serving twice, from 1779 to 1783 and again from 1792 to 1794. Thomas Sim Lee also served as a delegate of Maryland in the Congress of the Confederation in 1783 and was a member of the House of Delegates in 1787.

== Construction ==
Thomas Sim Lee was laid down on 23 September 1942, under a Maritime Commission (MARCOM) contract, MCE hull 921, by the Bethlehem-Fairfield Shipyard, Baltimore, Maryland; she was sponsored by Miss Jean Elizabeth O'Donovan Lee, a direct descendant of Thomas Sim Lee, and was launched on 24 October 1942.

== History ==
She was allocated to Agwilines Inc., on 31 October 1942. On 22 May 1950, she was first laid up in the National Defense Reserve Fleet, Beaumont, Texas. She was put back in service briefly during the Korean War, and laid up again in Beumont, on 23 April 1952. On 9 June 1972, she was sold for scrapping to Andy International, Inc., for $42,555. She was removed from the fleet on 7 July 1972.

== Bibliography ==
- "Bethlehem-Fairfield, Baltimore MD". www.ShipbuildingHistory.com. 14 August 2008.
- Maritime Administration. "Thomas Sim Lee". Ship History Database Vessel Status Card. U.S. Department of Transportation, Maritime Administration.
- Davies, James (May 2004). "Specifications (As-Built)" (PDF). p. 23.
- "SS Thomas Sim Lee".
