= Samuel White (Delaware politician) =

American politician

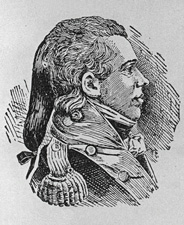

United States Senator from Delaware
- In office February 28, 1801 – November 4, 1809
- Preceded by: Henry Latimer
- Succeeded by: Outerbridge Horsey

Personal details
- Born: December 1770 Kent County, Delaware Colony
- Died: November 4, 1809 (aged 38) Wilmington, Delaware
- Party: Federalist
- Education: Cokesbury College
- Profession: Lawyer

Samuel White (December 1770 – November 4, 1809) was an American lawyer and politician from Wilmington, in New Castle County, Delaware. He was a member of the Federalist Party, who served as U.S. Senator from Delaware.

== Early life and family ==
White was born December 1770, in Mispillion Hundred, Kent County, Delaware, near Harrington, close to Whitesburg, the son of Judge Thomas White. The future Methodist Bishop, Francis Asbury, hid in this house during the Revolutionary War years of 1778 to 1780. Methodists were generally suspected of being Loyalists, and Thomas White was arrested on this charge. While in the White home, Asbury developed many of the ideas that would shape the future of American Methodism. Converted by Asbury, the previously devout Anglican family became members of the Methodist Church.

Samuel White was admitted to the Delaware Bar in 1793 after graduating from Cokesbury College in Maryland. White served two years as a captain in the United States Army and was named adjutant general of Delaware in 1803.

White's father, Judge Thomas White, was a member of the colonial Maryland legislature, the Delaware House of Assembly, the Chief Justice of the Kent County Court of Common Pleas, and delegate to the Delaware Constitutional Conventions of 1776 and 1792.

== Political career ==
Upon the resignation of Dr. Henry Latimer in 1801, White was chosen as U.S. Senator. He was then elected for full terms of his own in 1802 and 1808, and would serve as a senator from February 28, 1801, until his death November 4, 1809.

White strongly opposed slavery, but was especially known for his opposition to the Louisiana Purchase. He is quoted as saying "When I contemplate the evils that may arise to these States, from this intended incorporation of Louisiana into the Union, I would rather see it given to France, or to Spain, or to any other nation ... upon the mere condition that no citizen of the United States should ever settle within its limits ..."

"During the U.S. Senate trial of Timothy Pickering in 1809, on the charge of the embezzlement of public funds, White defended him in the words: 'The accused is not in default, but under the awful visitation of God: and, as he is deranged, our proceedings scarcely deserve the name of a mock trial.' Wilson Cary Nicholas, then congressman from Virginia, called out: 'I will not submit to hear our proceedings called by the name of a mock trial." Whereupon White at once replied: "It is a mock trial, and I am ready to give the gentleman, if he is offended, satisfaction at any time or place.' The sentiment in favor of dueling was so strong at that time that it does not appear on the records that the president of the senate administered any rebuke to the contestants. Mr. White had a national reputation as a marksman, and performed remarkable feats in shooting." By the time of his last session in the U.S. Congress he was one of only a very few Federalists still in office.

== Death and legacy ==
White died at Wilmington and is buried there in the Old Swedes Episcopal Church Cemetery.

== Almanac ==
The General Assembly chose the U.S. Senators, who took office March 4 for a six-year term. In this case he was initially completing the existing term, the vacancy caused by the resignation of Henry Latimer.

Public Offices
Office	Type	Location	Began office	Ended office	notes
U.S. Senator	Legislature	Washington	February 28, 1801	March 3, 1801	
U.S. Senator	Legislature	Washington	March 4, 1801	March 3, 1803	
U.S. Senator	Legislature	Washington	March 4, 1803	March 3, 1809	
U.S. Senator	Legislature	Washington	March 4, 1809	November 4, 1809	

United States Congressional service
Dates	Congress	Chamber	Majority	President	Committees	Class/District
1799–1801	6th	U.S. Senate	Federalist	John Adams		class 1
1801–1803	7th	U.S. Senate	Republican	Thomas Jefferson		class 1
1803–1805	8th	U.S. Senate	Republican	Thomas Jefferson		class 1
1805–1807	9th	U.S. Senate	Republican	Thomas Jefferson		class 1
1807–1809	10th	U.S. Senate	Republican	Thomas Jefferson		class 1
1809–1811	11th	U.S. Senate	Republican	James Madison		class 1

== See also ==
- List of members of the United States Congress who died in office (1790–1899)

== Notes ==
U.S. Senate
Preceded by Henry Latimer	U.S. senator from Delaware; 1801–1809	Succeeded by Outerbridge Horsey
