= Zachariah Ferris House =

Historic house in Delaware, United States

- U.S. National Register of Historic Places
- U.S. Historic district – Contributing property
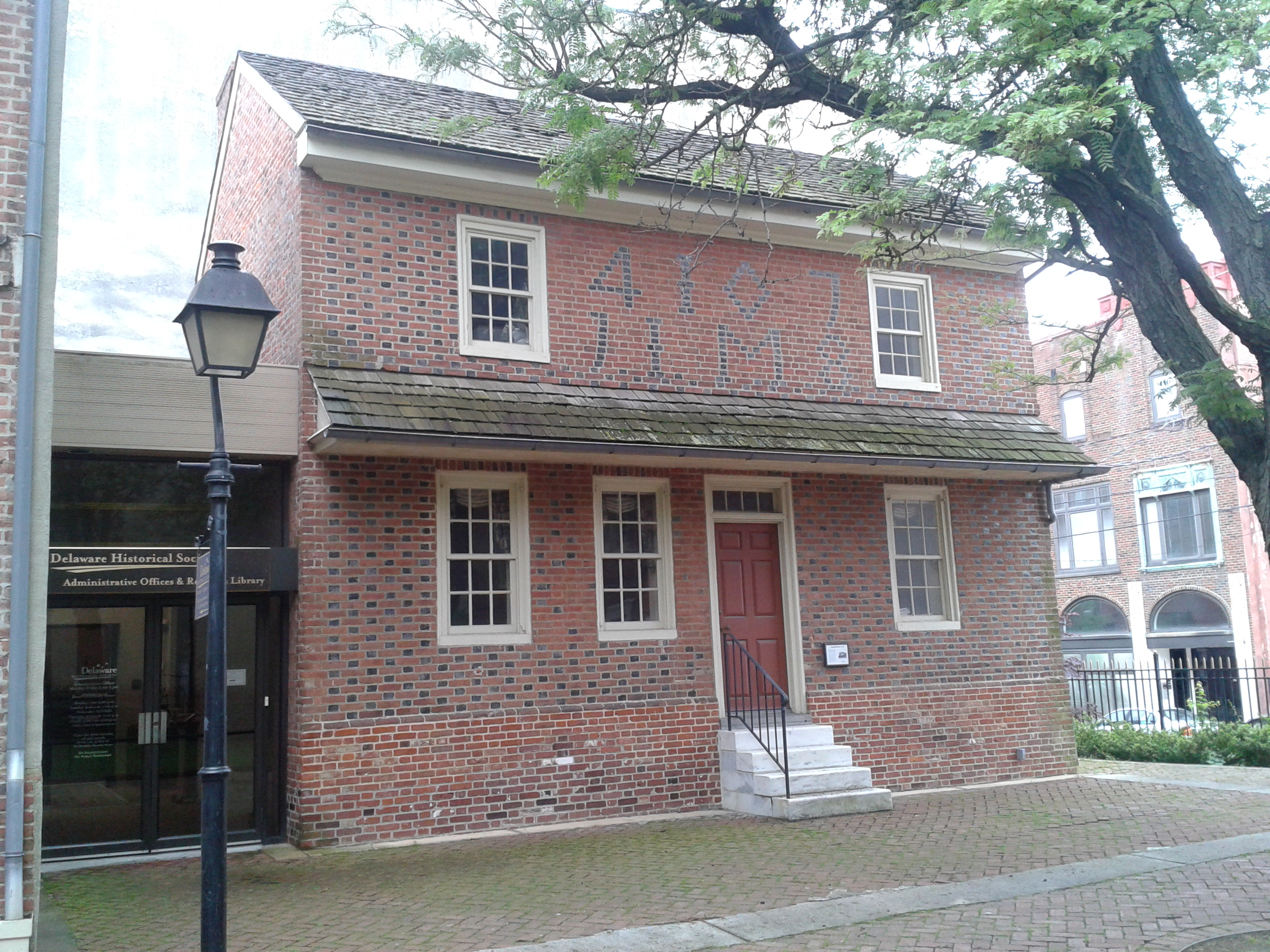
- The Zachariah Ferris House in May, 2016

- Location within Delaware Location within the United States
- Location: 500 Block North Market Street (formerly 414 W. 2nd St.), Wilmington, Delaware
- Coordinates: 39°44′30″N 75°33′3″W
- Area: 0.1 acres (0.040 ha)
- Built: 1718–1749
- NRHP reference No.: 70000173
- Added to NRHP: October 19, 1970

Zachariah Ferris House is a historic home located at Wilmington, New Castle County, Delaware. It was built between 1718 and 1749, and was an example of an early farmhouse continually occupied by professional and working families. It is a two-story, brick dwelling measuring 29 feet wide and 18 feet deep with a gable roof. It features a panel of brickwork between the two windows of the second floor, where two rows of numerals and letters are built in with dark glazed headers. The house was owned by Congressman Louis McLane and U.S. Senator Outerbridge Horsey.

It was added to the National Register of Historic Places in 1970. In 1976, it was moved to Willistown Square to save it from demolition. It is now owned by the Delaware Historical Society and is part of the Old Town Hall Commercial Historic District.
