= Melwood Park =

Historic house in Maryland, United States

- U.S. National Register of Historic Places
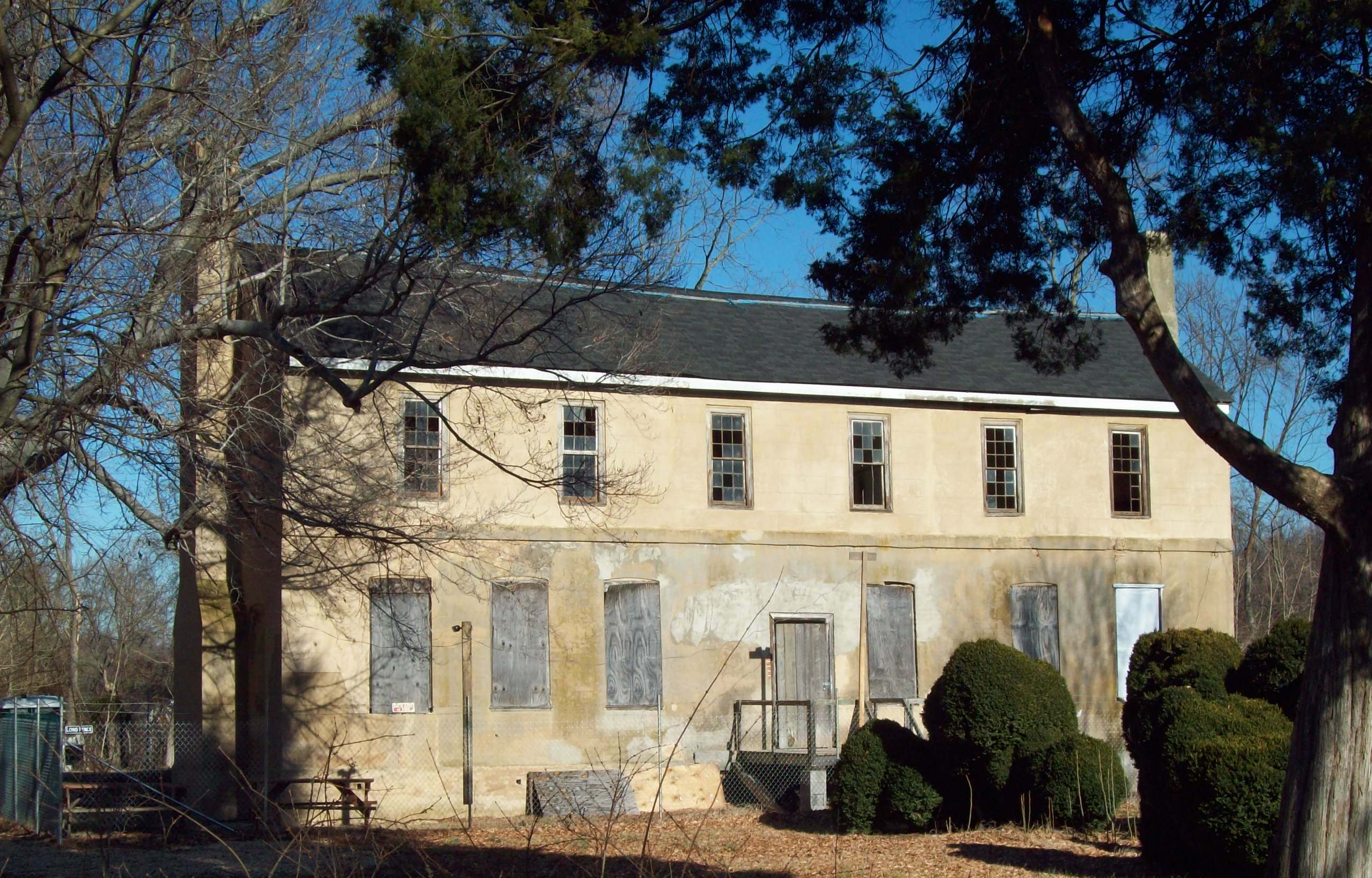
- Melwood Park, December 2008

- Location within Maryland Location within the United States
- Location: 10908 Old Marlboro Pike, Upper Marlboro, Maryland
- Coordinates: 38°48′45″N 76°49′1″W
- Area: 12 acres (4.9 ha)
- Built: 1729
- Built by: Diggs, William
- Architectural style: Georgian
- NRHP reference No.: 76002169
- Added to NRHP: October 8, 1976

Melwood Park is a historic home located near Upper Marlboro in Prince George's County, Maryland, United States. It is a 2 1/2-story, Flemish bond brick structure, with Georgian details. As of 2009, it is undergoing an extensive restoration. This unique dwelling was visited by George Washington on several occasions and the British Army camped here during their march to Washington, D.C. in August 1814, during the War of 1812.

Melwood Park was listed on the National Register of Historic Places in 1976.

== Ownership history ==
The house is significant for its early owners, some of the most prominent men in all phases of the life of colonial Maryland; the Digges, Carroll, and Lee families. The home was originally believed to have been built by Ignatius Digges (1707–1785) c. 1750, and subsequently raised to its present two stories by his widow, Mary Carroll Digges, in about 1800. Recent dendrochronology performed on the roof rafters of Melwood Park suggest an earlier construction date. The confirmed felling date of the timbers used in construction of the roof date to the winter of 1713 and spring of 1714. At the time Melwood Park was owned by Henry Darnell Jr. (1682–1737) who owned an adjacent 7,000-acre (28 km^{2}) plantation known as His Lordship's Kindness. His father, Henry Darnall (1645–1711), had earlier built nearby "The Woodyard."

The original Melwood Park land patent was for 1,050 acres (4.2 km^{2}) of which half were eventually inherited by the Digges family. William Digges, who inherited half of the property purchased the half where the manor house was located in 1729. Ignatius Digges, son of William, inherited Melwood from his father in 1740. Ignatius Digges left the plantation to his wife, Mary Carroll Digges, who went on to live at Melwood Park for the next 40 years after his death in 1785. Ignatius Digges grandson Ignatius Digges Lee, son of his daughter Mary (1745–1805) who was wife of Maryland Governor Thomas Sim Lee (1745–1819), was scheduled to inherit Melwood Park, but predeceased his grandmother. Lee and his wife were buried at Melwood Park until moved to a nearby Catholic cemetery in 1888. Melwood Park was sold to William Pumphrey in about 1825, following the death of Mary.

The current owner now is Mellwood Parke Foundation. Mellwood Parke is now managed by William C. Hendricks, as executive director.

== Structure history ==
=== Exterior ===
The 1713–1714 dwelling was a timber-framed structure approximately 39 feet (12 m), 6 inches by 20 feet (6.1 m), with an ell of equal size situated on the north side. This first dwelling was one and a half stories. This dwelling had an riven oak clapboard roof sheathing, a 17:12 pitched roof and likely clapboard siding. No drawings of the original structure have been located, nor are there references to this building in land records. However, the evidence of this original structure is present in the dwelling today.

Further dendrochronology performed in the roof structure indicated that significant changes were made to the building between 1767 and 1768. These changes include; extending the dwelling on the east by 6 feet (1.8 m) and on the west by 12 feet (3.7 m), extending the loft to a full story across the south facade only, the addition of two outward flanking chimney stacks, encasing the south facing facade with brick nogging and a veneer brick, adding 16/16 common sliding sash windows of the first floor and 9/9 common sliding sash windows on the second floor. The veneer brick and addition of solid masonry were set in an artful Flemish bond pattern with glazed headers, queen course and oyster shell lime mortar with a grapevine joint. During this expansion it is assumed that the northward ell was not modified, however this portion of the building was removed in a subsequent renovation likely to have occurred circa 1897.

=== Interior ===
The interiors of Melwood Park are as impressive as the exterior. The dining room was paneled wood from floor to ceiling, similar detailing is used throughout the dwelling. Recent paint analysis of the interior indicates that Ignatius Digges painted the renovated interior all one color, a rust red, common to the era with a high gloss varnished finish to aid in the reflectance of light. It appears likely that his wife Mary redecorated the interiors shortly after his death in 1785, completing her cosmetic changes sometime after 1800. Further paint analysis has revealed that the second finish applied to the wood work inside the dwelling was very bright and colorful. She appears to have chosen colors common to the wealthy of her day; Verdigris and Prussian blue among the color recently discovered. The Verdigris color in the central or entry hall of the house was applied in an unusual way, there are distinct layers, 7 to be exact, of color that is translucent. This was then covered with at least 3 layers of a translucent tinted varnish. The effect would have been magnificent and would today be very difficult to replicate. The Prussian blue seen in the east parlor (sometimes referred to as the dining room is dated to after 1800 due to the fact that a chemical which made the pigment more opaque was added to the paint, this chemical was not discovered or available in the United States until after 1800.

== See also ==
- Melwood, Maryland, census-designated place near Melwood Park
