= Melwood, Maryland =

Melwood
- Census-designated place
- Location within the state of Maryland Melwood (the United States)
- Coordinates: 38°48′07″N 76°50′30″W
- Country: United States
- State: Maryland
- County: Prince George's

Area
  - Total: 2.83 sq mi (7.34 km^{2})
  - Land: 2.83 sq mi (7.33 km^{2})
  - Water: 0.0039 sq mi (0.01 km^{2})

Population (2020)
  - Total: 3,977
  - Density: 1,405.8/sq mi (542.78/km^{2})
- Time zone: UTC−5 (Eastern (EST))
  - Summer (DST): UTC−4 (EDT)
- FIPS code: 24-51940

Melwood is an unincorporated community and census-designated place (CDP) in Prince George's County, Maryland, United States. It was newly delineated for the 2010 census, at which time its population was 3,051. Per the 2020 census, the population was 3,977.

== Geography ==
According to the U.S. Census Bureau, Melwood has a total area of 2.82 square miles (7.3 km^{2}), all land. The CDP is located directly to the east of Andrews Air Force Base.

== Demographics ==
Historical population
Census	Pop.	Note	%±
2010	3,051		—
2020	3,977		30.4%
U.S. Decennial Census; 2010 2020

Melwood first appeared as a census designated place in the 2010 U.S. census formed from part of Rosaryville CDP and additional area.

=== Racial and ethnic composition ===
Melwood CDP, Maryland – Racial and ethnic composition Note: the US Census treats Hispanic/Latino as an ethnic category. This table excludes Latinos from the racial categories and assigns them to a separate category. Hispanics/Latinos may be of any race.
Race / Ethnicity (NH = Non-Hispanic)	Pop 2010	Pop 2020	% 2010	% 2020
White alone (NH)	741	407	24.29%	10.23%
Black or African American alone (NH)	1,961	2,576	64.27%	64.77%
Native American or Alaska Native alone (NH)	20	16	0.66%	0.40%
Asian alone (NH)	45	55	1.47%	1.38%
Native Hawaiian or Pacific Islander alone (NH)	0	2	0.00%	0.05%
Other race alone (NH)	5	33	0.16%	0.83%
Mixed race or Multiracial (NH)	74	131	2.43%	3.29%
Hispanic or Latino (any race)	205	757	6.72%	19.03%
Total	3,051	3,977	100.00%	100.00%

=== 2020 census ===
As of the 2020 census, Melwood had a population of 3,977. The median age was 45.4 years. 21.2% of residents were under the age of 18 and 19.8% of residents were 65 years of age or older. For every 100 females there were 87.5 males, and for every 100 females age 18 and over there were 84.2 males age 18 and over.

100.0% of residents lived in urban areas, while 0.0% lived in rural areas.

There were 1,535 households in Melwood, of which 27.5% had children under the age of 18 living in them. Of all households, 42.7% were married-couple households, 16.7% were households with a male householder and no spouse or partner present, and 35.9% were households with a female householder and no spouse or partner present. About 30.8% of all households were made up of individuals and 18.7% had someone living alone who was 65 years of age or older.

There were 1,593 housing units, of which 3.6% were vacant. The homeowner vacancy rate was 1.7% and the rental vacancy rate was 4.5%.

== Education ==
Melwood residents are assigned to schools in Prince George's County Public Schools. The zoned schools are Melwood Elementary School, James Madison Middle School, and Dr. Henry A. Wise Jr. High School.

== See also ==
- Melwood Park, historic house located just outside Melwood
