= Thomas Sim Lee =

American politician (1745-1819)

Governor of Maryland
- In office April 5, 1792 – November 14, 1794
- Preceded by: James Brice
- Succeeded by: John H. Stone
- In office November 12, 1779 – November 22, 1782
- Preceded by: Thomas Johnson
- Succeeded by: William Paca

Personal details
- Born: October 29, 1745 Upper Marlboro, Province of Maryland, British America
- Died: November 9, 1819 (aged 74) Frederick County, Maryland, U.S.
- Party: Federalist
- Spouse: Mary Digges
- Relations: Philip Corbin Lee (grandfather); Richard Lee (uncle); John Lee (son); Outerbridge Horsey (son-in-law)
- Profession: planter, politician

Thomas Sim Lee (October 29, 1745 – November 9, 1819) was an American planter and politician who served as Maryland Governor for five one-year terms (1779-1783 and 1792-1794), as well as in the Congress of the Confederation (1783–84), Maryland Ratification Convention of 1788 and House of Delegates in 1787. He also held local offices and owned many town lots in Georgetown (which became part of the new federal city, Washington, District of Columbia, and spent his final decades operating "Needwood" plantation in Frederick County, Maryland. In addition to working closely with many of the Founding fathers, he played an important part in the birth of his state and the nation.

== Early life and education ==
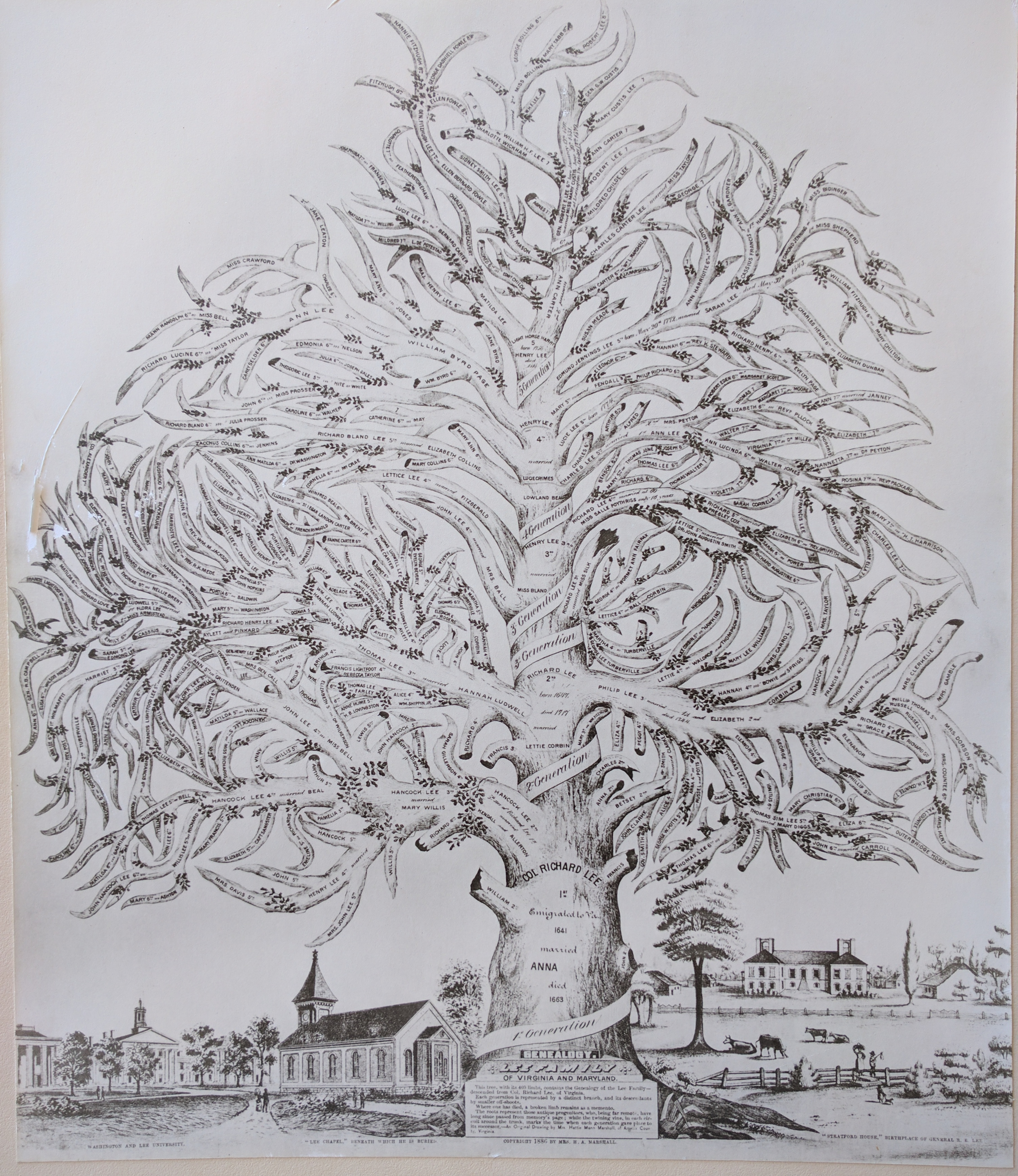
"Lee Family of Virginia and Maryland"

Lee was born in 1745 in Upper Marlboro in the Province of Maryland. He was the son of Thomas (died 1749) and Christiana (Sim) Lee, a grandson of Philip Lee, and descended from the "Blenheim" Line of the Lee family of Virginia. British merchant and Virginia politician Richard Lee I was his great-great-grandfather. He received a private education as befit his class, and in 1769 and 1770 was educated in Bath, England.

== Public life ==
Lee was a member of the provincial council by 1777. During the Revolutionary War, he backed the patriot cause, and organized a local militia in which he served as colonel

Governor Lee's wife, Mary Digges Lee, also rallied the women of Maryland to raise money in support of the war effort. She then established a correspondence with General George Washington, asking how these resources could be put to best use. General Washington responded suggesting that the money raised be put toward the purchase of much-needed shirts and black neck clothes for the troops in the Southern army. He expressed gratitude to Mrs. Lee for the "patriotic exertions of the ladies of Maryland in favor of the army".

=== American Revolutionary war ===
Thomas Sim Lee participated in the Annapolis Convention in the mid-1770s, which produced a constitution for Maryland and transformed the colony into a state. On July 26, 1775, he was one of the signatories of the Declaration of the Association of the Freemen of Maryland, an influential statement in the Revolutionary War.

Lee won his first state elective office in 1777, and served for two years in the Maryland Legislature.

=== First gubernatorial term ===
Fellow Maryland legislators elected Lee governor in 1779. He was reelected in 1780 and 1781. During his first tenure, issues regarding the war effort were dealt with. He won wide praise for his logistical abilities as governor. Lee consistently procured fresh troops and supplies for the Continental Army. George Washington was Lee's friend, and learning of the plan to pin down Cornwallis, Lee exerted all his energies to support the American troops. After completing his term, Lee was forbidden to stand for re-election, and so left office on November 22, 1782.

=== Articles of Confederation and Continental Congressman ===
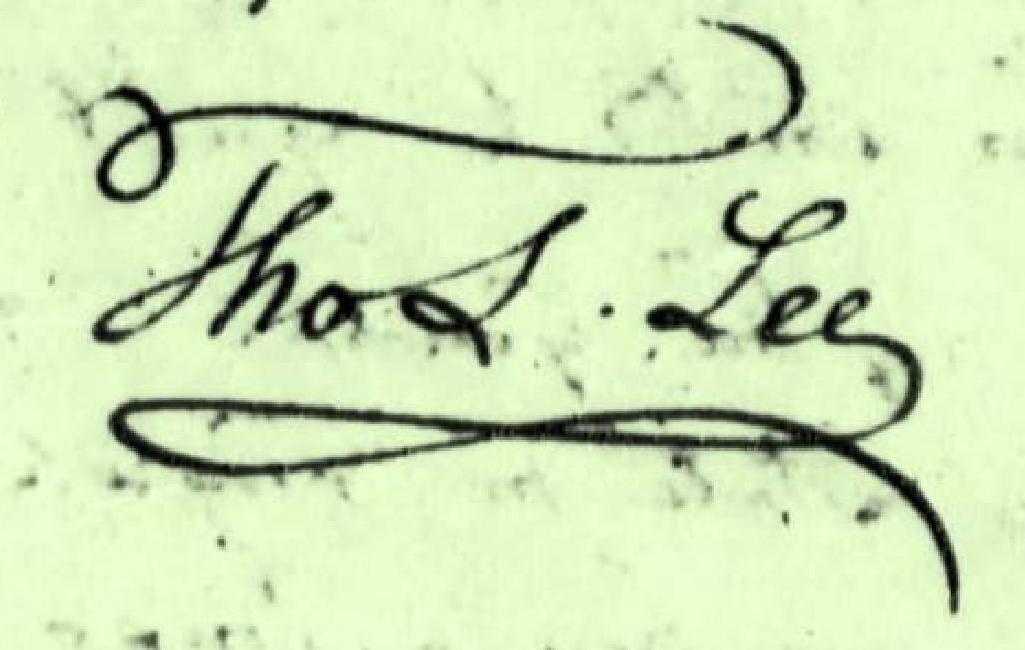
Signature of Governor Thomas Sim Lee on Act of Maryland legislature to ratify the Articles

As Governor of Maryland, Thomas Sim Lee signed the Act on February 2, 1781, whereby the Maryland Legislature ratified the Articles of Confederation and Perpetual Union. As Maryland was the 13th and final state to ratify the Articles, the act established the requisite unanimous consent for the formation of a Perpetual Union of the states. Maryland had previously held out and refused to ratify the Articles until every state had ceded its western land claims. After Governor Thomas Jefferson signed the Act of the Virginia legislature on January 2, 1781, to grant these concessions the way forward for Maryland was cleared. On this second day of February, a Friday, as the last piece of business during the afternoon Session, "among engrossed Bills" was "signed and sealed by the Governor, in the Senate Chamber, in the presence of the members of both Houses...an Act to empower the delegates of this state in Congress to subscribe and ratify the articles of confederation." The Senate then adjourned "to the first Monday in August next". The formal signing of the Articles by the Maryland delegates took place in Philadelphia at noon time on March 1, 1781. With these events, the Articles entered into force and the United States came into being as a united and sovereign nation.

After his first gubernatorial term, Thomas Sim Lee represented Maryland as a delegate to the Continental Congress in 1783 and 1784. He returned to the Maryland house of delegates in 1787. He declined the opportunity to serve in the convention that drafted the Constitution of the United States, but served in the state convention that ratified the Constitution in 1788. Lee voted for Washington's second term as a Federalist presidential elector. Lee was a delegate to the Maryland State Convention of 1788, to vote whether Maryland should ratify the proposed Constitution of the United States.

=== Second gubernatorial term ===
In 1792, Lee was again elected governor of Maryland. He was reelected to a second term in 1793, and to a third term in 1794. During this final tenure, the state militia was established, and the Whiskey rebellion suppressed. Lee left office on November 14, 1794. Later that same year, he declined a seat in the U.S. Senate. He also declined a third tenure as governor in 1798.

== Planter ==
Thomas Sim Lee's became a planter in Frederick County, Maryland, some time between 1775 and 1790. In 1775, Thomas Sim Lee was a resident of Prince George's County, and not in the Frederick County, Maryland census until 1790. Complicating matters, in the 1798 census his home was in Montgomery County, and in 1802 in the new District of Columbia, specifically in the Georgetown section in 1804-1807. After retiring from political life in 1794, Governor Lee focused his attention on his estate, Needwood, in Frederick County, Maryland. He bought some property in Frederick County in 1775 and an interest in Needwood from pioneer educator Rev. Bartholomew Booth in 1783, but the transaction took decades, possibly because Booth's son and executor sold the land to one of two wealthy women who had emigrated to the colonies with pioneer educator Rev. Bartholomew Booth, Mary Valiens, who married Gen Horatio Gates and whose interest was relinquished in 1816. (Her sister Anna Bardsley purchased land in Washington County, Maryland). In the first federal census, in 1790, Lee owned 119 enslaved people in Frederick County. In the same year, Lee also owned 16 slaves in Montgomery County, Maryland, which included Georgetown before creation of the federal city, as discussed below. In 1800, Lee owned 109 slaves in Frederick County, and 13 in Georgetown in the newly established District of Columbia. Lee sold four slaves to his daughter Elizabeth Digges Lee in 1806, who were manumitted in 1812, about seven months after her marriage to Outerbridge Horsey, a federalist from Delaware who served in the U.S. Senate, then spent his final years near Needwood. His grandson (also Thomas Sim Lee), continued to operate Needwood using slave labor, but paid taxes only for 13 slaves in 1850.

This Thomas Sim Lee also maintained a winter home in Georgetown, near the nation's capital. Federalists frequented the home.

Thomas Sim Lee was on the Board of directors of the Patowmack Canal, which George Washington and other members intended to connect the Tidewater near Georgetown with Cumberland. The project, which started in 1785, was completed in 1802, but closed in 1828. Nonetheless, sections were deepened and incorporated into the Chesapeake and Ohio Canal, now a national park.

== Personal life ==
On October 27, 1771, Thomas Sim Lee married Mary Digges (1745–1805), whose father was a prominent Maryland landowner. In addition to their patriotic activities during the Revolutionary War described below, they were also very committed to their religion and community and founded the St. Mary's Roman Catholic Church in Petersville, Maryland. They had eight children:

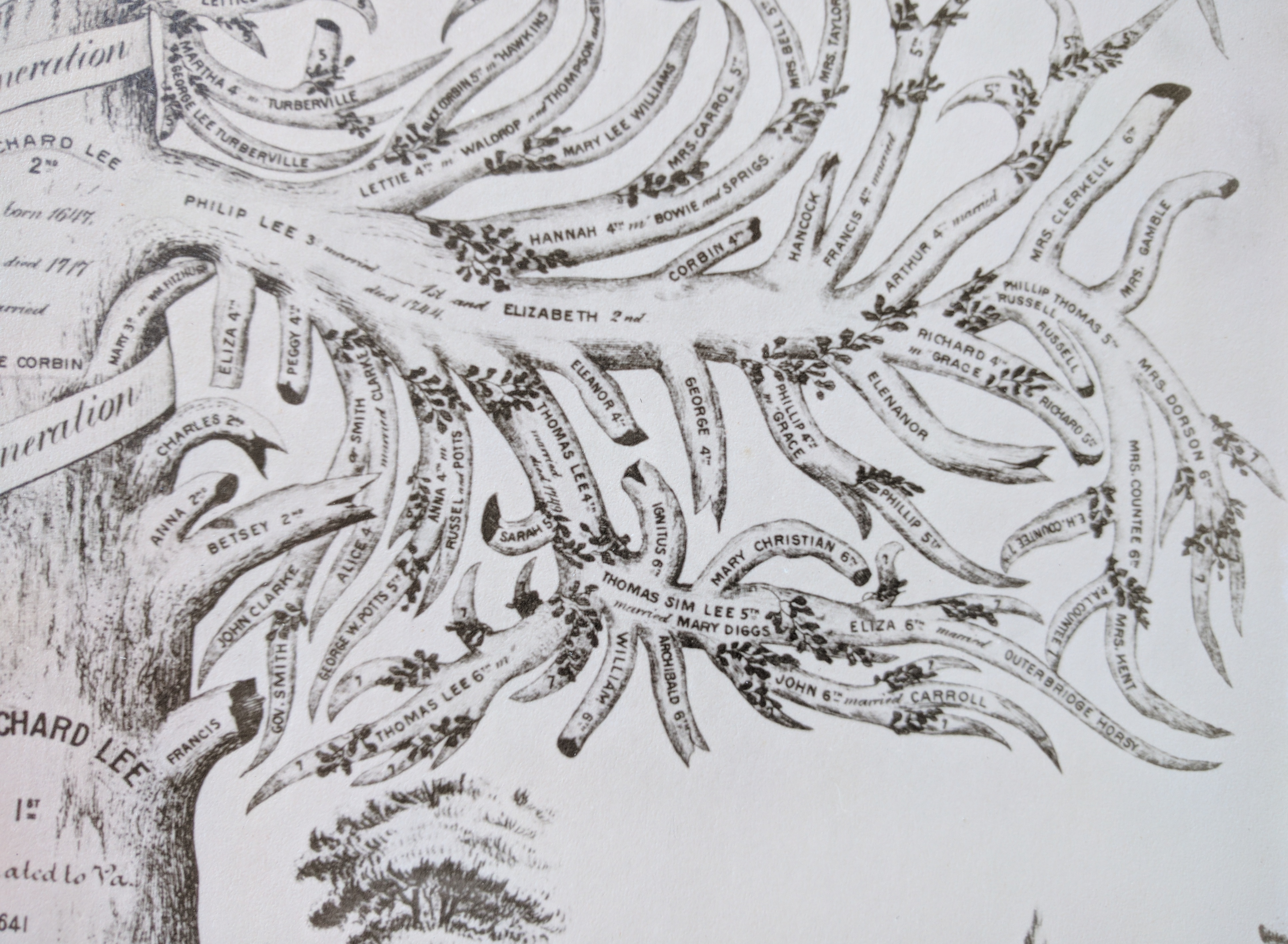
Thomas Sim Lee branch of "Lee Family of Virginia and Maryland" by Mrs. H. A. Marshall, circa 1886.

- Ignatius Lee (born 1772)
- Thomas Lee (1774–1826)
- William Lee (1775–1845)
- Eliza Lee (born c. 1777)
- Archibald Lee (1778–1781)
- Archibald Lee (1781–1839)
- Mary Christian Lee (born c. 1783)
- Elizabeth Digges Lee (1783–1862) – married Outerbridge Horsey in 1812.
- John Lee (1788–1871)

== Death and legacy ==
Mary Digges Lee died on January 25, 1805, at the age of 60. The widower never remarried, but lived at Needwood until his death on November 9, 1819, aged 74 years. A year before his death, he manumitted an enslaved woman named Nelly. Thomas Sim Lee was first buried at Melwood Park, his wife's family home. In 1888 his and the Melwood Diggeses' graves were moved to a common grave in Mt. Carmel Roman Catholic Cemetery near Upper Marlboro, Maryland.

Many of his papers are held by the Maryland Historical Society, which in cooperation with the Maryland State Archive, makes them available digitally. The special collections division of the Georgetown University also has five of his letters.

A bronze plaque commemorating Thomas Sim Lee is affixed to a house he built in 1790 on 3001–3009 M Street (on the corner of M Street and 30th Street) in the Georgetown section of Washington D.C.. The site is now referred to as the Thomas Sim Lee Corner.

The World War II Liberty Ship SS Thomas Sim Lee was named in his honor.

The Thomas Sim Lee Corner

== See also ==
Sobel, Robert, and John Raimo, eds. "Biographical Directory of the Governors of the United States, 1789–1978, Vol. 2," Westport, Conn.; Meckler Books, 1978. 4 vols.

Political offices
Preceded by Thomas Johnson	Governor of Maryland; 1779–1782	Succeeded by William Paca
Preceded by James Brice; Acting Governor	Governor of Maryland; 1792–1794	Succeeded by John Hoskins Stone
