= Outerbridge Horsey =

American politician

United States Senator from Delaware
- In office January 12, 1810 – March 3, 1821
- Preceded by: Samuel White (Note: The seat was vacant from November 4, 1809, until January 12, 1810.)
- Succeeded by: Caesar Augustus Rodney (Note: The seat was vacant from March 4, 1821, until January 23, 1822.)

4th Attorney General of Delaware
- In office 1806–1810
- Governor: Nathaniel Mitchell; George Truitt
- Preceded by: Nicholas Van Dyke
- Succeeded by: Thomas Clayton

Personal details
- Born: March 5, 1777 Sussex County, Delaware, US
- Died: June 9, 1842 (aged 65) Frederick County, Maryland, US
- Party: Federalist
- Spouse: Eliza Lee
- Profession: Lawyer

Outerbridge Horsey III (March 5, 1777 – June 9, 1842) was an American lawyer and politician. He was a member of the Federalist Party, who served in the Delaware General Assembly, as the 4th Attorney General of Delaware from 1806 to 1810 and as United States Senator from Delaware from 1810 to 1821.

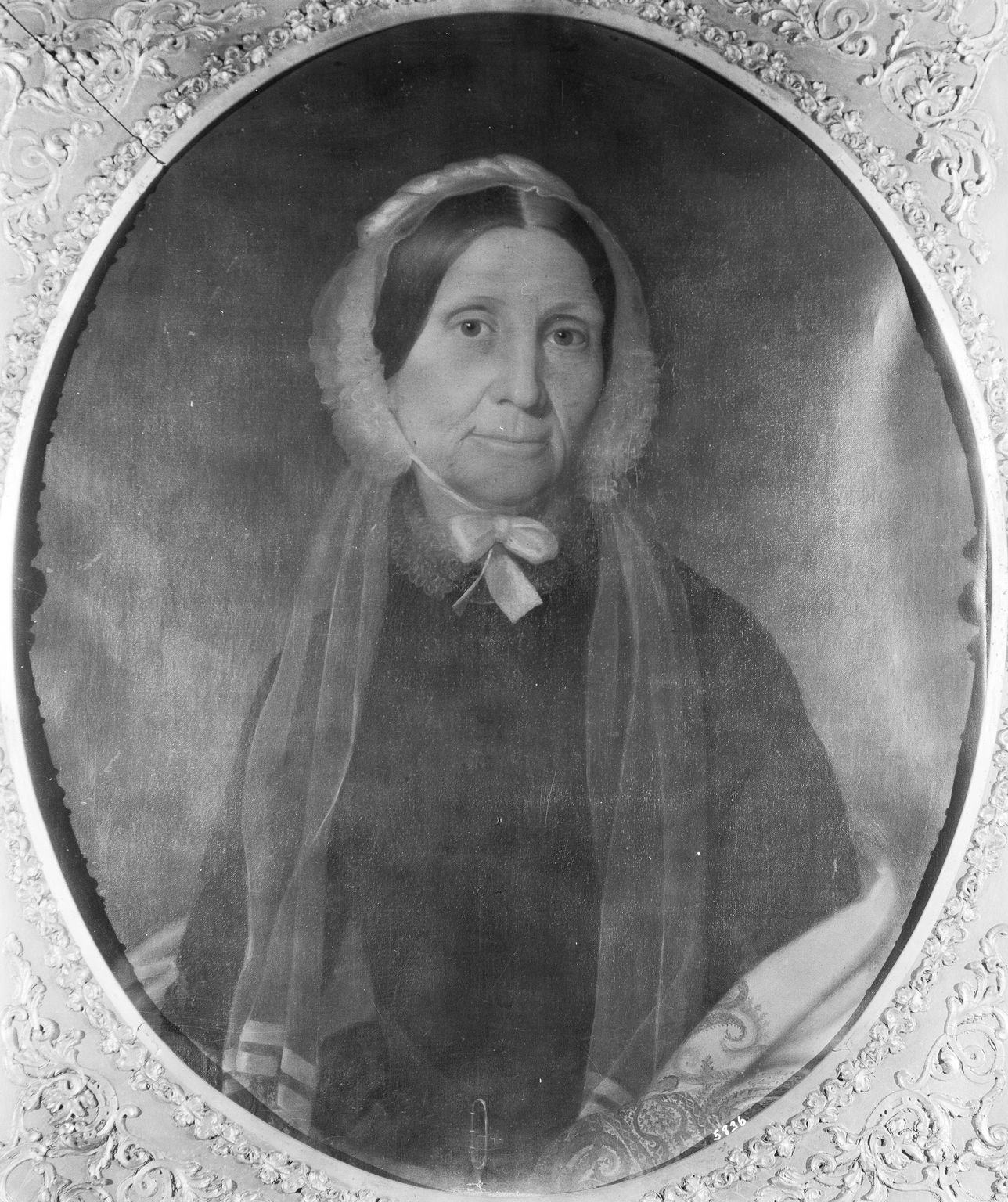
Mrs. Outerbridge Horsey (Eliza Lee)

== Early life, education and marriage ==
Horsey was born in Stepney Parish, Somerset County, Maryland, to William Horsey of Rewastico (1745–1786), a planter, merchant, member for Somerset County of the Ninth Maryland Convention (which framed Maryland's first state constitution) in 1776, and a justice of Somerset County, and Eleanor ("Nellie") Wailes, daughter of George Wailes. After living in Georgetown, he moved to Wilmington, and studied the law there under James A. Bayard, who remained his lifelong political mentor. A frequent supporter of education, Horsey, early in his career, urged the establishment of a library in Georgetown and later was appointed a trustee of the College of Wilmington.

He married Elizabeth Digges Lee, daughter of former Governor Thomas Sim Lee (1745–1819) of Maryland. They had at least two sons who survived to adulthood:

- Thomas Sim Lee Horsey (1816–1834), who died unmarried
- Outerbridge Horsey IV (1819–1902), an attorney who at an early age decided to consecrate his life to the manufacture of whiskey and set up a distillery at the Needwood estate, which he inherited from his father - of his four sons who survived to adulthood, only one married and had children, Outerbridge Horsey V (1875–1931), who left the family estate to study at Georgetown and thence to New York Law School, upon which he settled in New York City and established a respectable legal practice, becoming a member of the firm Nicoll, Anable, Fuller & Sullivan, where he stayed until its dissolution in 1924 and from then until his death in 1931 was a member of the firm Jackson, Fuller, Nash & Brophy - his son (Outerbridge Horsey III's great-grandson) Outerbridge Horsey (1910–1983) became a career U.S. diplomat and lived in the District of Columbia, as does his son of the same name.

== Early legal career ==
He was admitted to the Delaware Bar in December 1807, and began a practice in Wilmington. One source believes he served as a delegate in Delaware's legislature in 1800–1802, but his father may have shared the same name.

Horsey owned more than 36 slaves during his life and freed some of them as he grew older. Seven months after his marriage, on November 11, 1812, he manumitted fourteen enslaved people, including four enslaved people whom Elizabeth Lee Horsey had bought from her father in 1806.

== Professional and political career ==
While practicing the law and after representing Sussex County in the Delaware State House from the 1801 session through the 1803 session, Horsey was appointed to be the Delaware Attorney General and served from 1806 to 1810.

In 1810 he was elected to the U.S. Senate to fill the vacancy caused by the death of U.S. Senator Samuel White. In the Senate, he initially opposed the War of 1812 strongly, but once it had been declared, he supported it with equal vigor. He accordingly became a member of the Committee of Safety and was actively involved in preparing the defenses of Fort Union and Wilmington. In March 1814 Horsey presented a petition from the citizens of Delaware to repeal the Embargo Act of 1807; although he was able to get a committee appointed to consider the question, the effort was ultimately unsuccessful. He was reelected in 1814 and served from January 12, 1810, (Note: He was seated on January 29, 1810.) to March 3, 1821.

Following the War of 1812, but while still a contentious subject, the need for internal improvements had become much more apparent and recognized. It would be on Horsey's motion in January 1816, that the Senate finally passed the resolution to print and distribute copies of Treasury Secretary Albert Gallatin's 1808 Report on the Subject of Public Roads and Canals. The report, which had been requested by the Senate in 1807 and transmitted to it in 1808 had fallen victim to the embargo, the loss of revenue, and the necessities of war. With the report's distribution, many of its concepts would be incorporated into the Bonus Bill of 1817.

Several years later, he parted ways with the Delaware General Assembly which had passed a resolution asking Delaware's congressmen to vote against any extension of slavery. Horsey did not feel U.S. Congress had the right to prohibit slavery in Missouri, or anywhere else in the Louisiana Purchase, and so supported the Missouri Compromise. Understanding the unpopularity of this position, he did not seek reelection when his term ended. During the 16th Congress, he served as Chairman of the Committee on the District of Columbia.

== Retirement, death and legacy ==
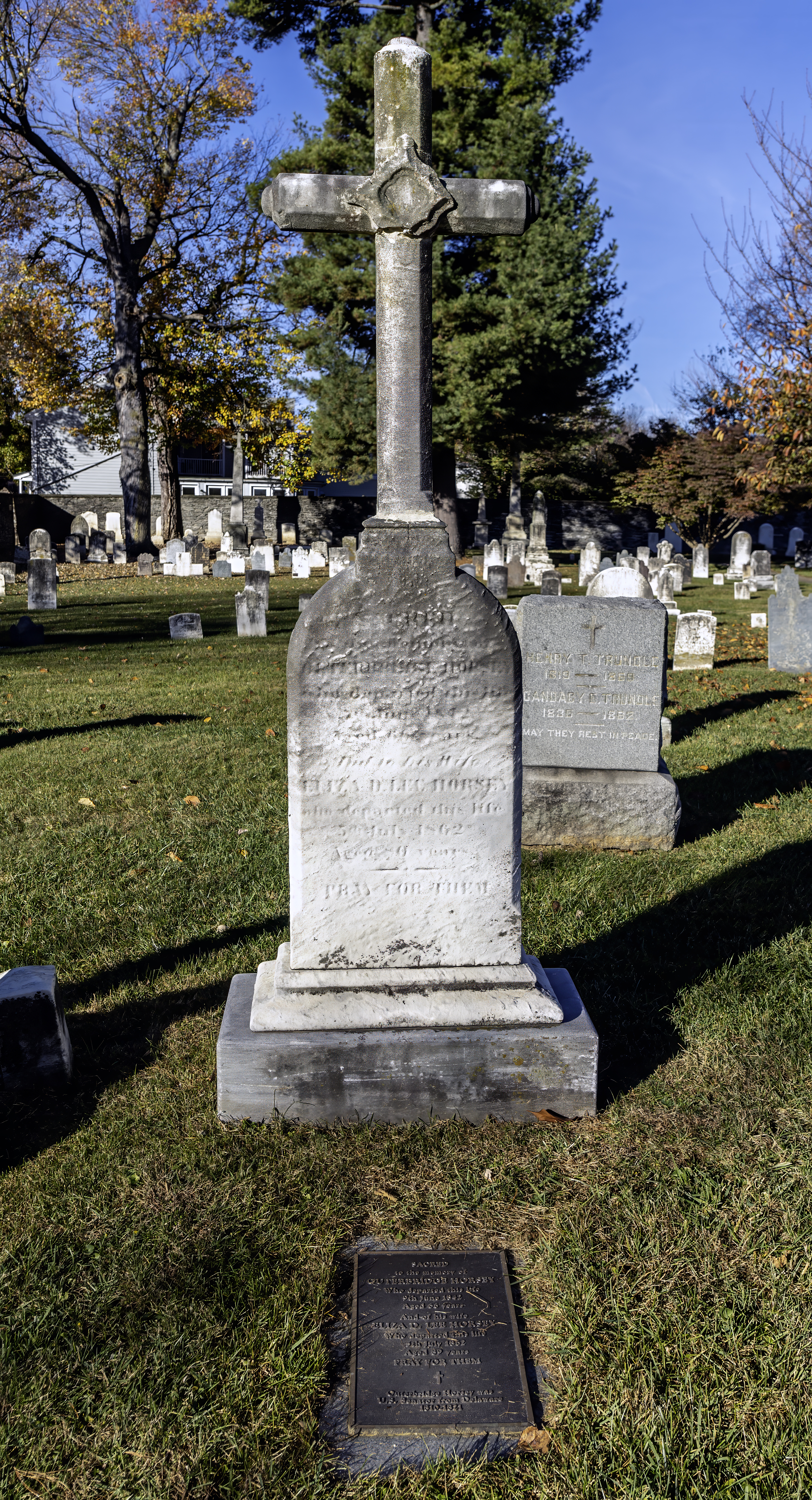
Horsey's grave marker in St. John's Cemetery, Frederick, Maryland

Upon his father-in-law's death, his wife inherited several hundred acres of the 945-acre Needwood tract near Petersville and Burkittsville in Frederick County, Maryland. In later life, he built an attractive but modest brick two-story Federal-style dwelling known as 'Horsey Needwood' and spent his declining years and died there on June 9, 1842. He is buried in St. John's Cemetery at Frederick, Maryland. His son Outerbridge Horsey IV built the more grand Victorian-style addition in his prosperous years. The house was eventually sold out of the family in 1939 but still stands today.

He owned the Zachariah Ferris House, listed on the National Register of Historic Places in 1970. The main house at Needwood Farms, operated by his brother in law Thomas S. Lee, who sympathized with the Confederacy during the Civil War, remains and is eligible for the National Register of Historic Places, although the Horsey Distillery did not survive the conflict. His son, also Outerbridge Horsey (1819–1902), was a Democratic politician who represented Frederick County at the 1867 state constitutional convention.

== Almanac ==
Elections were held the first Tuesday of October. Members of the State House took office on the first Tuesday of January for a term of one year. The General Assembly chose the U.S. Senators, who took office March 4 for a six-year term. In this case, he was initially completing the existing term, the vacancy caused by the death of Samuel White.

Public offices
Office	Type	Location	Began office	Ended office	Notes
State Representative	Legislature	Dover	January 6, 1801	January 5, 1802	
State Representative	Legislature	Dover	January 5, 1802	January 4, 1803	
State Representative	Legislature	Dover	January 4, 1803	January 3, 1804	
Attorney General	Executive	Dover	1806	1810	Delaware
U.S. Senator	Legislature	Washington	January 12, 1810	March 3, 1815	
U.S. Senator	Legislature	Washington	March 4, 1815	March 3, 1821	

United States congressional service
Dates	Congress	Chamber	Majority	President	Committees	Class/District
1810–1811	11th	U.S. Senate	Republican	James Madison		class 1
1811–1813	12th	U.S. Senate	Republican	James Madison		class 1
1813–1815	13th	U.S. Senate	Republican	James Madison		class 1
1815–1817	14th	U.S. Senate	Republican	James Madison		class 1
1817–1819	15th	U.S. Senate	Republican	James Monroe		class 1
1819–1821	16th	U.S. Senate	Republican	James Monroe		class 1

== Places with more information ==
- Delaware Historical Society; website; 505 North Market Street, Wilmington, Delaware 19801; (302) 655-7161.
- University of Delaware; Library website; 181 South College Avenue, Newark, Delaware 19717; (302) 831-2965.

Legal offices
Preceded by Nicholas Van Dyke	Attorney General of Delaware; 1806–1810	Succeeded by Thomas Clayton
U.S. Senate
Preceded by Samuel White	U.S. senator from Delaware; 1810–1821	Succeeded by Caesar Augustus Rodney
