= John Hoskins Stone =

American planter, soldier, and politician (1750-1804)

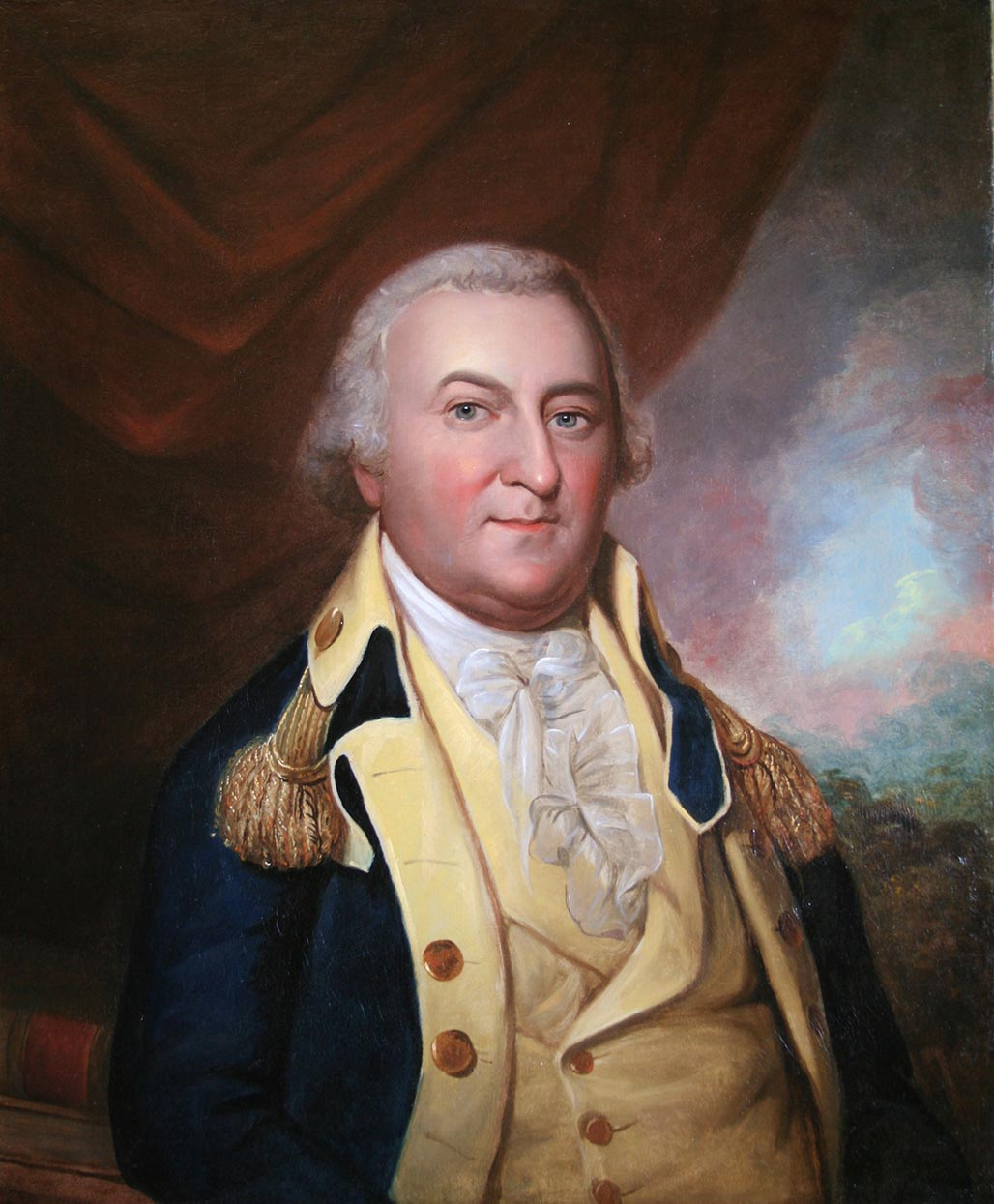
- Posthumous Portrait by Charles Willson Peale, c. 1824

7th Governor of Maryland
- In office November 14, 1794 – November 17, 1797
- Preceded by: Thomas S. Lee
- Succeeded by: John Henry

Member of the Maryland House of Delegates
- In office 1785–1787
- In office 1790

Personal details
- Born: July 17, 1749 Charles County, Province of Maryland, British America
- Died: October 5, 1804 (aged 55) Annapolis, Maryland, U.S.
- Party: Federalist
- Spouse: Anne Couden

John Hoskins Stone (July 17, 1749 – October 5, 1804) was an American planter, soldier, and politician from Charles County, Maryland. During the Revolutionary War he led the 1st Maryland Regiment of the Continental Army. After the war he served in the state legislature and was the seventh governor from 1794 to 1797.

== Personal life ==
Coat of Arms of John Hoskins Stone

John was born at his father's plantation of Poynton Manor in Charles County. His family had been prominent since early colonial days when William Stone had served as governor a hundred years before his birth. His parents were David and Elizabeth (Jenifer) Stone. His elder brothers included Thomas (who signed the Declaration of Independence) and Michael (who represented Maryland in the U.S. Congress). The Jenifer family was of Swedish origin.

John had been baptized in the Anglican Church. After the split caused by the revolution he was an active Episcopalian. He married Anne Couden in February 1781, and the couple would have six children, five of whom lived to adulthood: Couden, Anne, Elizabeth, Robert Couden, and Thomas.

== Revolutionary War ==
In 1775, Stone joined the newly organized Maryland Battalion led by Colonel William Smallwood as a lieutenant. He was soon promoted to captain of the battalion's first company. The battalion became part of the 1st Maryland Regiment of the Continental Army, and went north to fight in the war. They fought in the Battles of Brooklyn (where Captain Stone was especially distinguished) and White Plains. Then, in late 1776, when Smallwood was promoted to Brigadier General, Stone became the Lieutenant Colonel of the regiment.

When the Continental Line was re-organized early in 1777, General Smallwood had earned additional responsibility as a brigade commander. Stone was made Colonel and commander of the 1st Maryland. He led the regiment in the Battles of Princeton, Brandywine, and Germantown. He was wounded at Germantown and as a result was lame for the rest of his life.

Colonel Stone was back in active command by the Battle of Monmouth. His unit was active in the continuing defense of New Jersey. His career ended when he was wounded again in the Battle of Stony Point on July 14, 1779. This time his wounds were more serious and he resigned his commission on August 1.

== Political career ==
Stone returned home to Maryland and was made a member of the state's Executive Council where he served from 1779 until 1785. He was admitted as an original member of The Society of the Cincinnati of Maryland when it was established in 1783, later serving as the vice president (1792-1795) and president (1795-1804) of the Maryland Society. Charles County elected him to the Maryland House of Delegates in 1785, returning annually until 1787, and again in 1790. Stone then returned to the State Council in 1791 and 1792.

Stone was elected to a single three-year term as Governor of Maryland from 1794 to 1797, before returning to private life. He died in 1804 in Annapolis, Maryland, at the age of 55, and was buried there.

Political offices
Preceded by Thomas Sim Lee	Governor of Maryland; 1794–1797	Succeeded by John Henry
