= Mary Digges Lee =

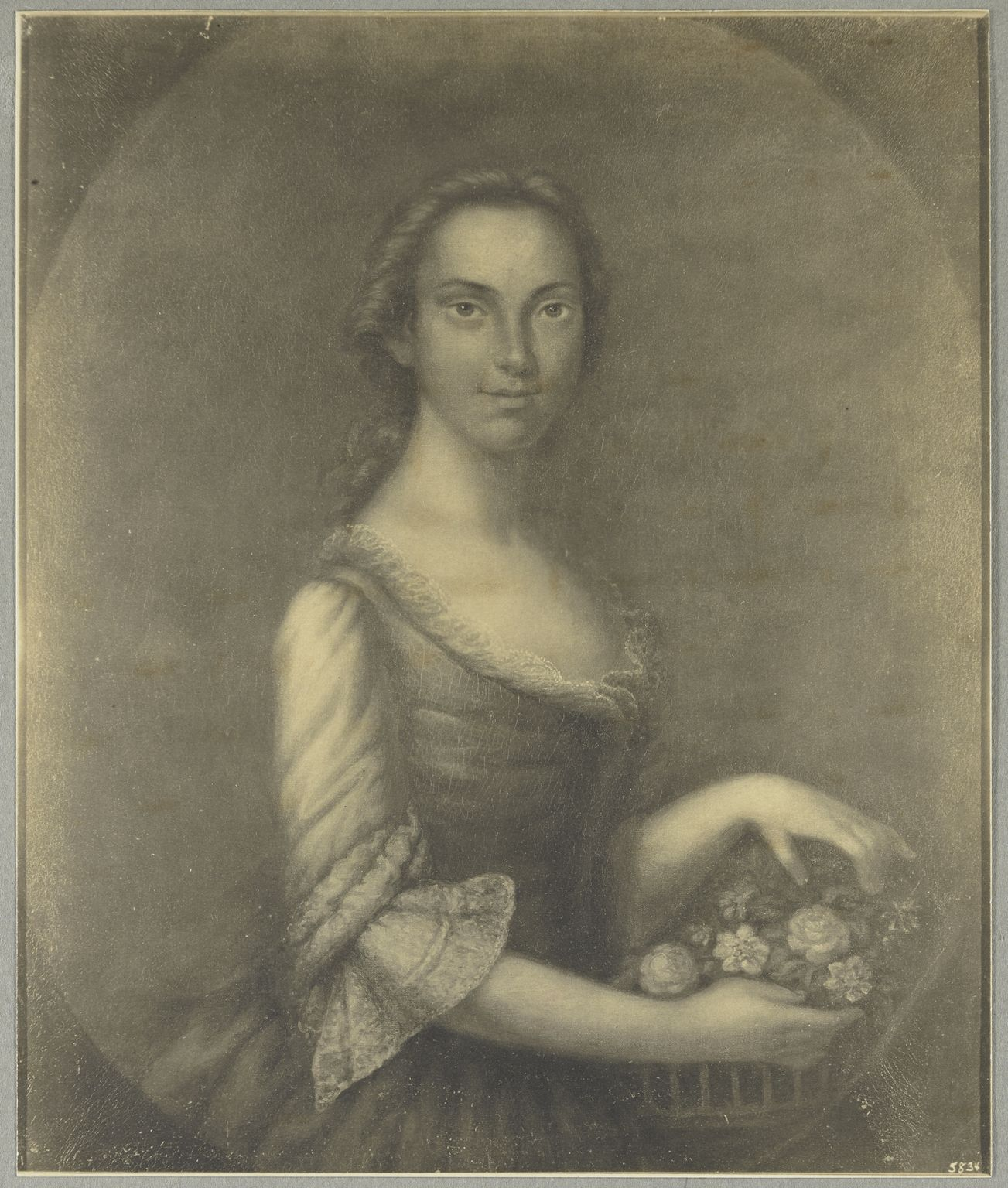
- Born: 1745; Prince George's County
- Died: 25 January 1805 (aged 59–60)
- Spouse(s): Thomas Sim Lee
- Awards: Maryland Women's Hall of Fame (1996)

Mary Digges Lee (1745 – January 25, 1805) was the "First Lady of Maryland" during portions of the American Revolution, while her husband, Thomas Sim Lee, was the state's governor. Lee was later inducted into the Maryland Women's Hall of Fame.

== Biography ==
Lee's ancestry included prominent politicians such as Dudley Digges, who lived in Britain, and Edward Digges, who immigrated to the United States and was politically involved there. Edward had settled in York County, Virginia in the second half of the 17th century; the family moved to Maryland in the 18th.

Mary Digges was born in 1745 at her family's home of Mellwood Park in Prince George's County, Maryland, to Ignatius Digges and Elizabeth Parnham Craycroft Digges. Elizabeth died early in Lee's life, and Ignatius Digges remarried to Mary Carroll. Mary married Thomas Sim Lee, after overcoming her father's opposition to their marriage because of Thomas's different religion, on October 27, 1771. Ignatius, a practicing Roman Catholic, was reluctant to let his daughter marry Lee, an Anglican. His eventual acquiescence was contingent on their children being raised in the Catholic Church. Thomas Lee later converted to Catholicism, though the date is unclear.

The new couple moved to Thomas Lee's estate, Needwood. They had eight children together.

The couple founded St. Mary's Roman Catholic Church in Petersville, Maryland. During the American Revolution, the couple were prominent supporters of the revolutionaries. Thomas Sim Lee was elected the Second Governor of Maryland in 1779, a position he held until 1794. In response to a written request for aid from George Washington to her husband, Mary Lee entered the public sphere. She encouraged women in the state to donate goods and time, including 260 shirts in response to a request from the Maryland Regiment Extraordinary. George Washington thanked her in a letter for the "patriotic exertions of the ladies of Maryland in favor of the army." Lee may also have been involved in the publication of an anonymous letter in the Maryland Gazette that encouraged women to aid the Continental Army.

Lee died on January 25, 1805.

She was inducted into the Maryland Women's Hall of Fame in 1996.
