= Bowie (surname) =

- Pronunciation: /ˈbuːi, ˈboʊi, ˈbaʊi/ BOO-ee, BOH-ee, BOW-ee
- Gender: Unisex
- Language: English

Origin
- Languages: 1. Scottish Gaelic; 2. Irish
- Origin: 1. buidhe 2. Ó Buadhaigh
- Meaning: 1. "yellow", "fair-haired" 2. "descendant of Buadhach"

Other names
- See also: Bogue; Buadhach; Buidheach; Bhuidheach; Ó Buadhaigh; Mac'IlleBhuidh; Nic'IlleBhuidh

Bowie is a Scottish and Irish surname. The personal name Buadhach means "victorious". The surname Bowie is rendered in Scottish Gaelic as Buidheach (masculine) and Bhuidheach (feminine), as well as Mac'IlleBhuidhe (masculine) and Nic'IlleBhuidhe (feminine). Early instances of the surname in Scotland, recorded in 1481, are: Boye, Bowy, and Boee.

A family of the surname, the Bowie family, was one of the colonial families of Maryland with John Bowie Sr. being the first Bowie in the colony.

== People with the surname ==
- Alistair Bowie (born 1951), Scottish footballer
- Andrew Bowie (born 1987), Scottish politician
- Andrew Bowie (philosopher), British philosopher
- Angie Bowie (born 1949), American, wife of David
- Angus M. Bowie (born 1949), British classicist
- Anthony Bowie (born 1963), American basketball player
- Arturo Valenzuela Bowie (Arturo Valenzuela, born 1944), Chilean-American academic
- Ash Bowie (born c.1968), American musician
- Beth Mburu-Bowie (born 1987), English musician
- Christopher Bowie (born 1966), Canadian swimmer
- David Bowie (1947–2016), musician, artist, and actor
- Don Bowie (climber) (born 1969), Canadian climber
- Don Bowie (footballer) (born 1940), Scottish footballer
- Douglas Bowie (born 1944), Canadian playwright and screenwriter
- Eric A. Bowie (1936–2019), Canadian judge
- Fiona Bowie (born before 1990), Canadian artist
- George Washington Bowie (1827–1901), American soldier
- Gordon W. Bowie (before 1985–2012), American trombonist, composer and conductor
- Henry Pike Bowie (1848–1921), American lawyer, artist, author, Japanologist and diplomat
- Jac Bowie (born 1979), Australian burlesque producer
- James Bowie (c.1796–1836), American revolutionary from Texas
- James Bowie (botanist) (c.1789–1869), English botanist
- James Bowie (footballer) (1888–1972), Scottish footballer
- Jamie Bowie (born 1989), British track and field athlete
- Jerome Bowie (d. 1597), Scottish master of the royal wine cellar
- Jim Bowie (baseball) (born 1965), American baseball player
- Jimmy Bowie (1924–2000), Scottish footballer
- Joanne W. Bowie (active 1989–2004), American politician from North Carolina
- John Bowie (disambiguation), multiple people
- Joseph Bowie (born 1953), American bandleader, trombonist, and founder of the jazz fusion band Defunkt
- Kieron Bowie (born 2002), Scottish footballer
- Larry Bowie (guard) (1939–2012), American football player
- Larry Bowie (running back) (born 1973), American football player
- Les Bowie (1913–1979), Canadian-born special effects artist who worked mainly in Britain
- Lester Bowie (1941–1999), American jazz musician
- Malcolm Bowie (1943–2007), British academic
- Micah Bowie (born 1974), American baseball player
- Michael Bowie (born 1991), American Football player
- Nate Bowie (born 1986), professional basketball player
- Norman E. Bowie (born 1942), American academic
- Oden Bowie (1826–94), American politician from Maryland
- Reginald Bowie (1854–1926), American politician and businessman
- Rezin Bowie (1793–1841), American inventor of the Bowie knife, politician in Louisiana
- Richard Bowie (1807–81), American politician from Maryland
- Robert Bowie (1750–1818), American politician from Maryland
- Robert R. Bowie (1909–2013), American diplomat
- Russell Bowie (1880–1959), Canadian ice hockey player
- Sam Bowie (born 1961), American basketball player
- Sam Bowie (rugby league) (born 1989), Australian rugby player
- Stanley Bowie (1917–2008), Scottish geologist
- Sydney J. Bowie (1865–1928), American politician from Alabama
- Thomas Fielder Bowie (1808–1869), American politician from Maryland
- Tori Bowie (1990–2023), American long jumper
- Walter Bowie (1748–1810), American politician
- Walter Russell Bowie (1882–1969), American theologian
- Captain William Bowie (1721 – after 1776), American politician
- William Bowie (agrarian) (1776–1826), American agrarian and politician
- William Bowie (footballer) (1869–1934), Scottish footballer
- William Bowie (engineer) (1872–1940), American geodetic engineer
- William Duckett Bowie (1803–1873) American politician from Maryland

== See also ==
- Dowie
- Cowie (surname)
