= 1814 Maryland gubernatorial election =

- December 12, 1814
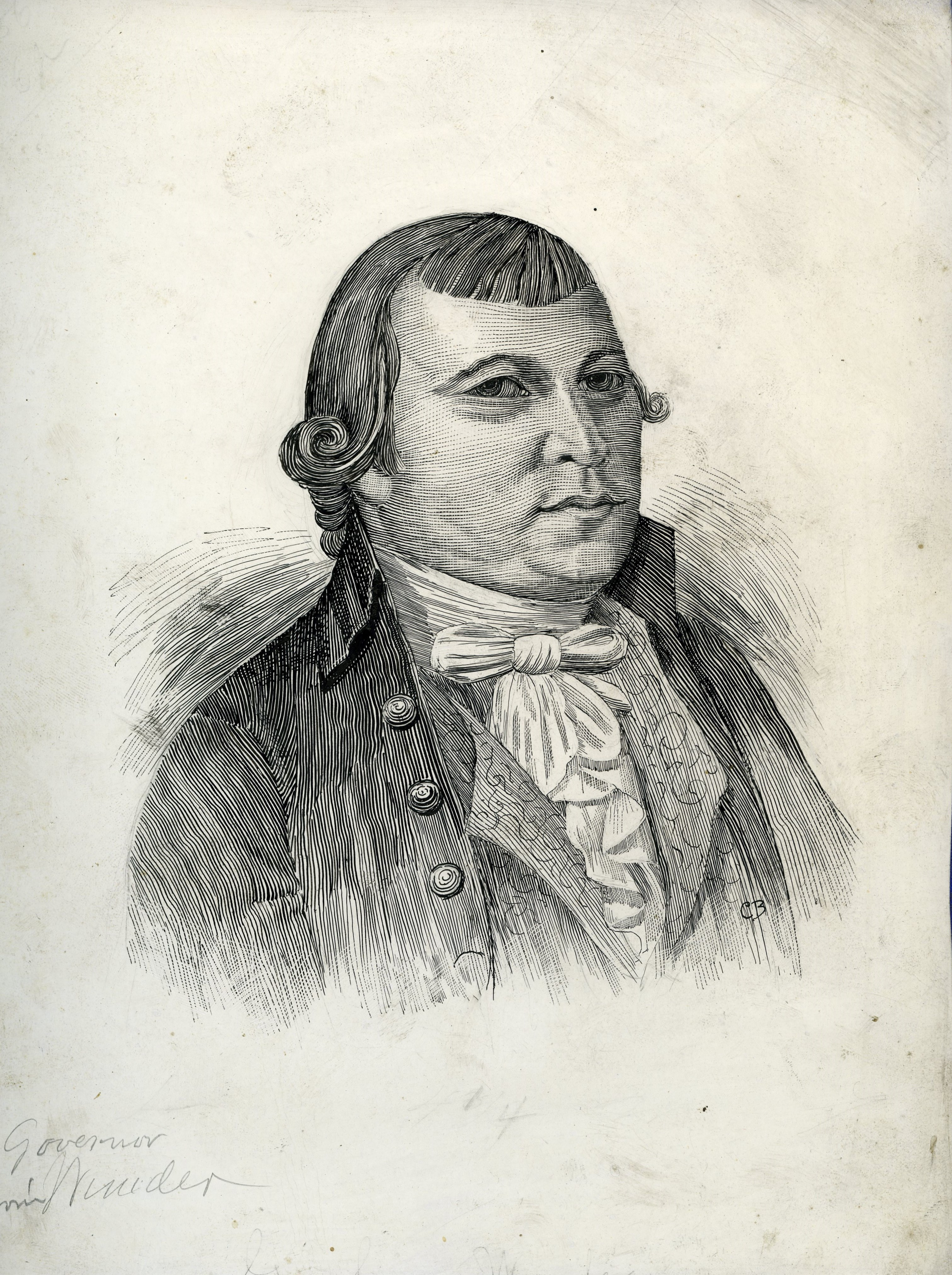

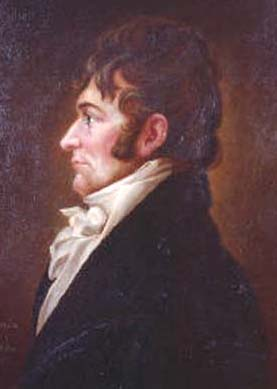
Nominee	Levin Winder	Robert Bowie
Party	Federalist	Democratic-Republican
Popular vote	48	23
Percentage	67.61%	32.39%
Governor before election
Levin Winder
Federalist
Elected Governor
Levin Winder
Federalist

The 1814 Maryland gubernatorial election was held on December 12, 1814, in order to elect the governor of Maryland. Incumbent Federalist governor Levin Winder was re-elected by the Maryland General Assembly against former Democratic-Republican governor Robert Bowie in a rematch of the previous election.

== General election ==
On election day, December 12, 1814, incumbent Federalist governor Levin Winder was re-elected by the Maryland General Assembly, thereby retaining Federalist control over the office of governor. Winder was sworn in for his third term on January 2, 1815.

=== Results ===
Maryland gubernatorial election, 1814
Party	Candidate	Votes	%
Federalist	Levin Winder (incumbent)	48	67.61
Democratic-Republican	Robert Bowie	23	32.39
Total votes		71	100.00
Federalist hold			
