= 1816 Maryland gubernatorial election =

- December 9, 1816
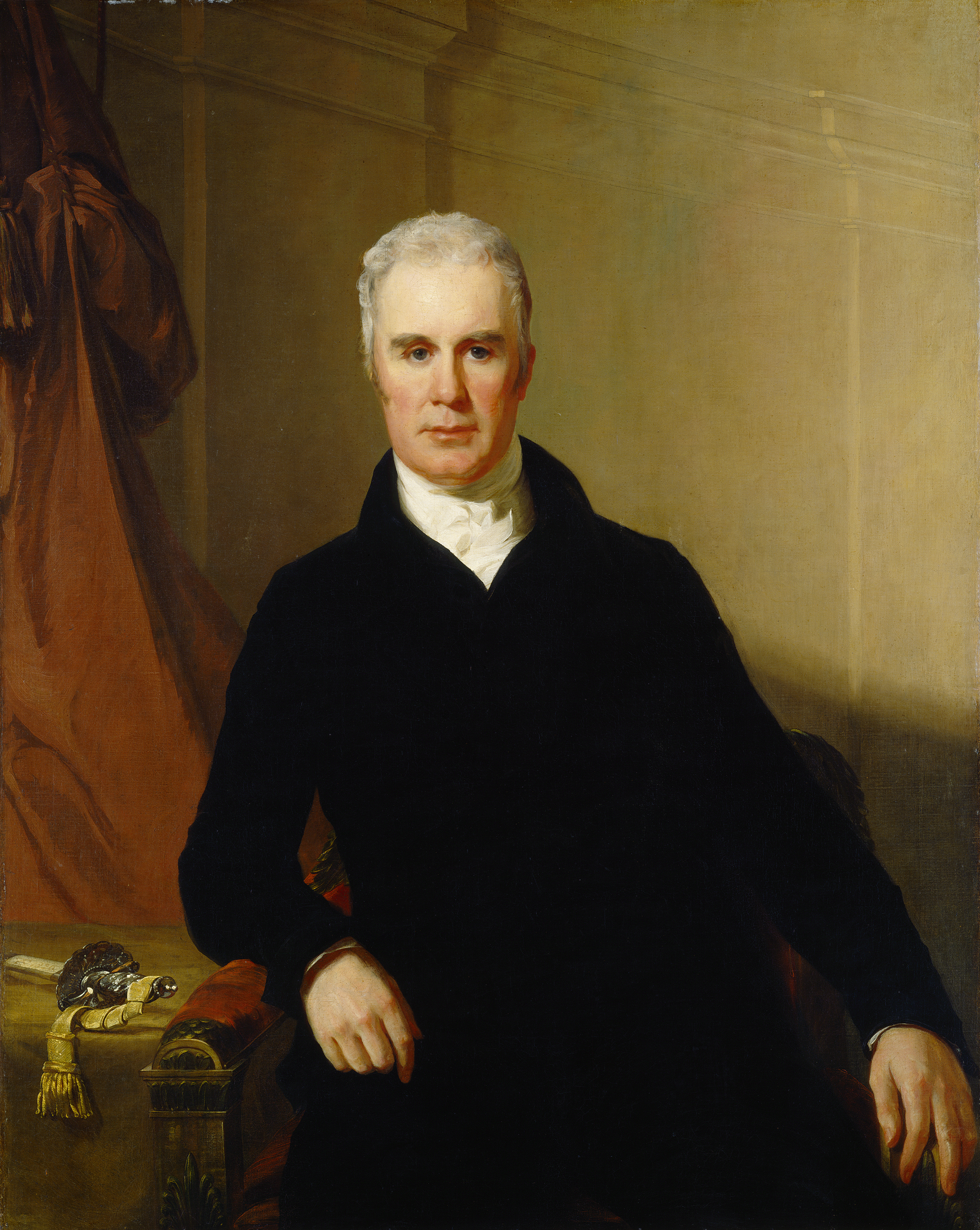

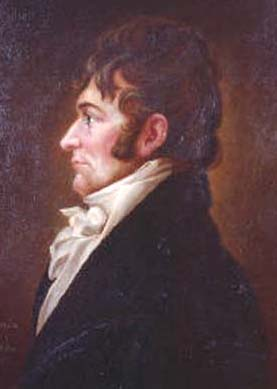
Nominee	Charles Carnan Ridgely	Robert Bowie
Party	Federalist	Democratic-Republican
Popular vote	62	17
Percentage	78.48%	21.52%
Governor before election
Charles Carnan Ridgely
Federalist
Elected Governor
Charles Carnan Ridgely
Federalist

The 1816 Maryland gubernatorial election was held on December 9, 1816, in order to elect the governor of Maryland. Incumbent Federalist governor Charles Carnan Ridgely was re-elected by the Maryland General Assembly against former Democratic-Republican governor Robert Bowie in a rematch of the previous election.

== General election ==
On election day, December 9, 1816, incumbent Federalist governor Charles Carnan Ridgely was re-elected by the Maryland General Assembly, thereby retaining Federalist control over the office of governor. Ridgely was sworn in for his second term on January 6, 1817.

=== Results ===
Maryland gubernatorial election, 1816
Party	Candidate	Votes	%
Federalist	Charles Carnan Ridgely (incumbent)	62	78.48
Democratic-Republican	Robert Bowie	17	21.52
Total votes		79	100.00
Federalist hold			
