= 1813 Maryland gubernatorial election =

- December 13, 1813
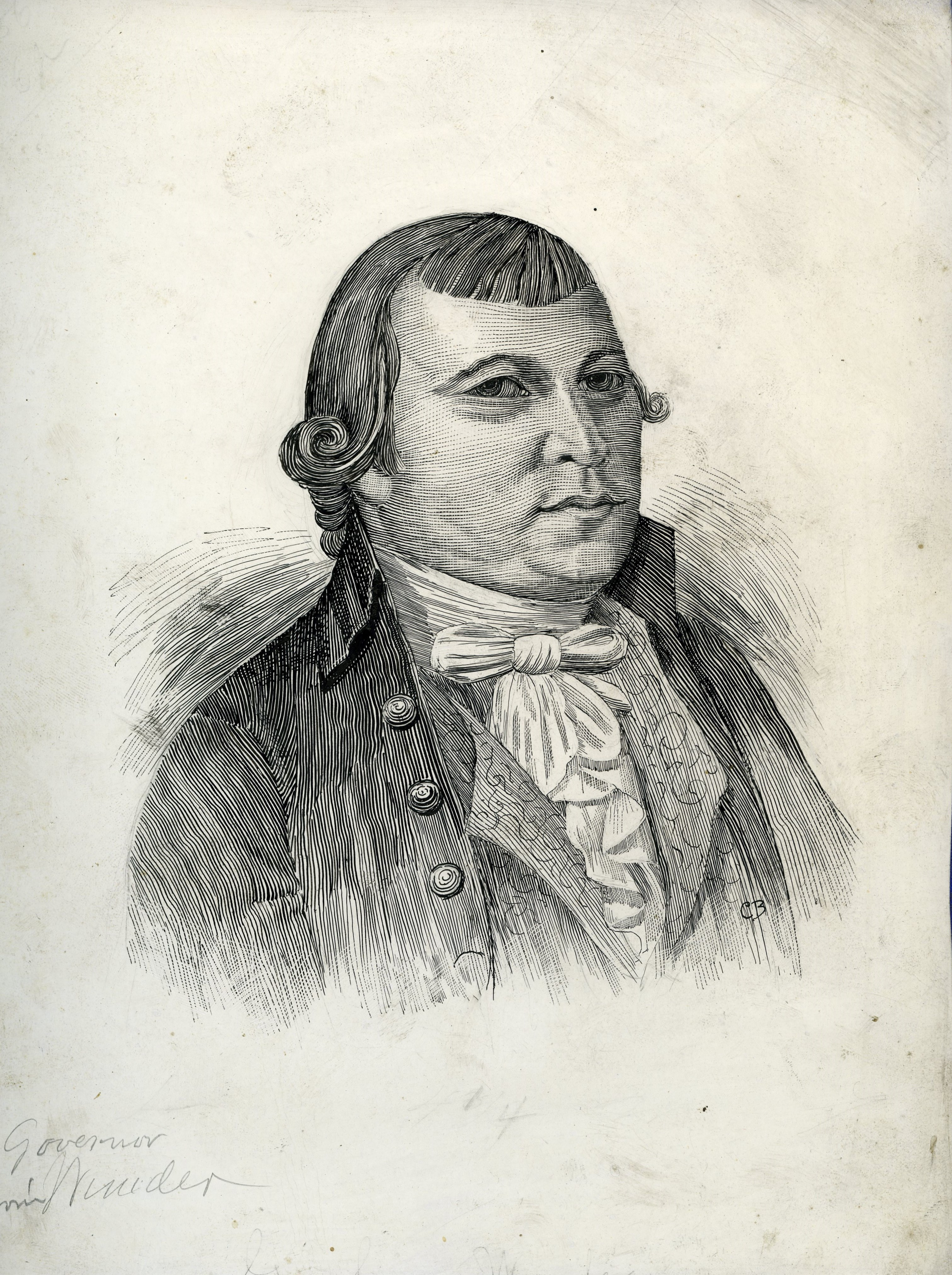

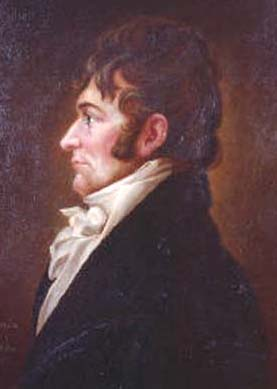
Nominee	Levin Winder	Robert Bowie
Party	Federalist	Democratic-Republican
Popular vote	48	28
Percentage	63.16%	36.84%
Governor before election
Levin Winder
Federalist
Elected Governor
Levin Winder
Federalist

The 1813 Maryland gubernatorial election was held on December 13, 1813, in order to elect the governor of Maryland. Incumbent Federalist governor Levin Winder was re-elected by the Maryland General Assembly against former Democratic-Republican governor Robert Bowie in a rematch of the previous election.

== General election ==
On election day, December 13, 1813, incumbent Federalist governor Levin Winder was re-elected by the Maryland General Assembly, thereby retaining Federalist control over the office of governor. Winder was sworn in for his second term on January 2, 1814.

=== Results ===
Maryland gubernatorial election, 1813
Party	Candidate	Votes	%
Federalist	Levin Winder (incumbent)	48	63.16
Democratic-Republican	Robert Bowie	28	36.84
Total votes		76	100.00
Federalist hold			
