= Governor Bowie =

Governor Bowie may refer to:

- Oden Bowie (1826–1894), 34th Governor of Maryland
- Robert Bowie (1750–1818), 11th Governor of Maryland
