= 1815 Maryland gubernatorial election =

- December 11, 1815
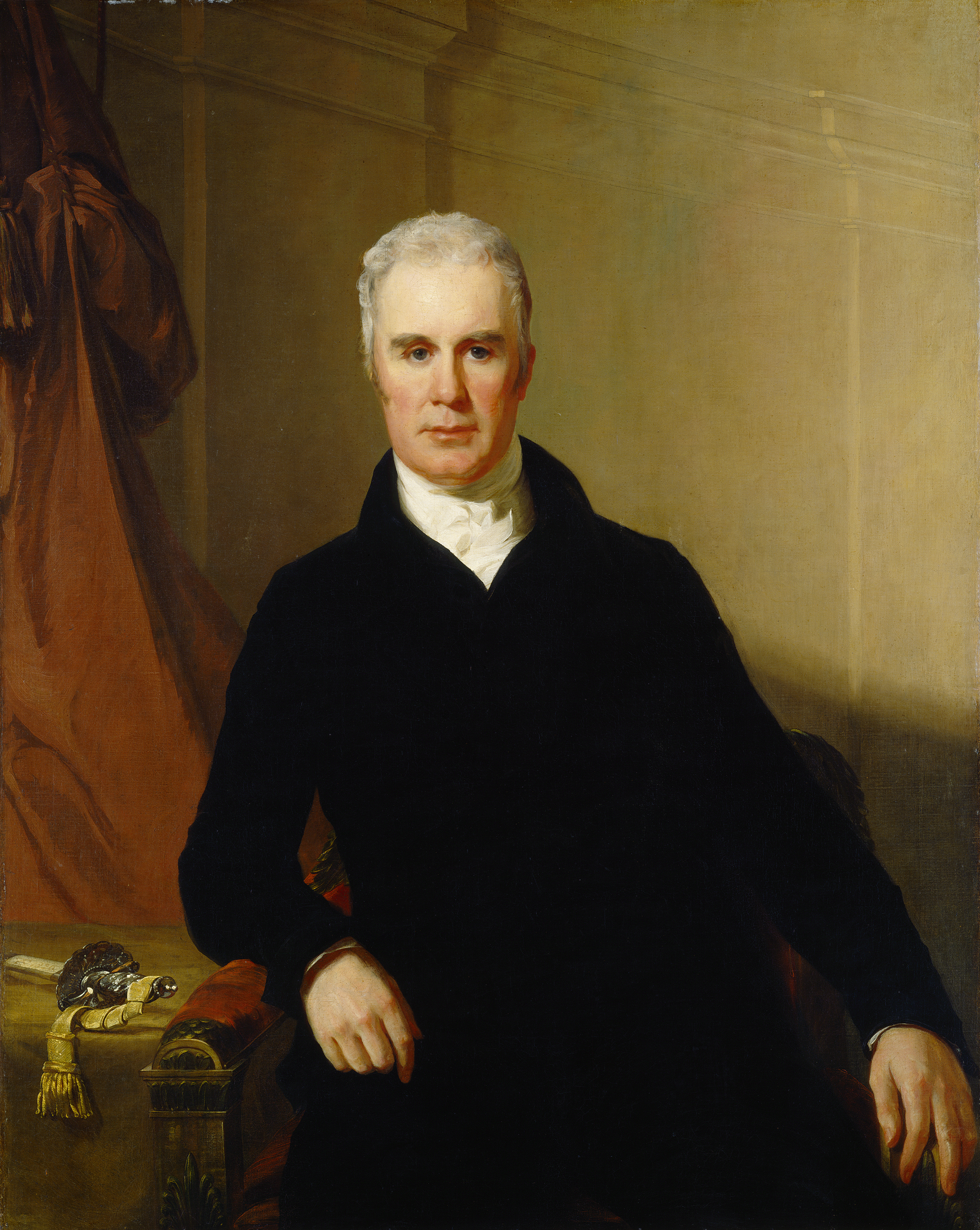

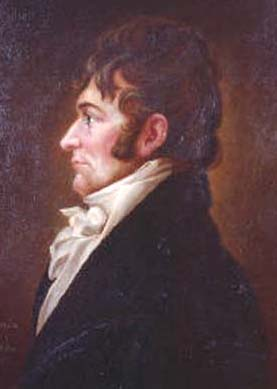
Nominee	Charles Carnan Ridgely	Robert Bowie
Party	Federalist	Democratic-Republican
Popular vote	47	45
Percentage	51.09%	48.91%
Governor before election
Levin Winder
Federalist
Elected Governor
Charles Carnan Ridgely
Federalist

The 1815 Maryland gubernatorial election was held on December 11, 1815, in order to elect the governor of Maryland. Federalist nominee and former member of the U.S. House of Representatives from Maryland Charles Carnan Ridgely was elected by the Maryland General Assembly against former Democratic-Republican governor Robert Bowie.

== General election ==
On election day, December 11, 1815, Federalist nominee Charles Carnan Ridgely was elected by the Maryland General Assembly, thereby retaining Federalist control over the office of governor. Ridgely was sworn in as the 15th governor of Maryland on January 2, 1816.

=== Results ===
Maryland gubernatorial election, 1815
Party	Candidate	Votes	%
Federalist	Charles Carnan Ridgely	47	51.09
Democratic-Republican	Robert Bowie	45	48.91
Total votes		92	100.00
Federalist hold			
