= Bowieville =

Historic house in Maryland, US

- U.S. National Register of Historic Places
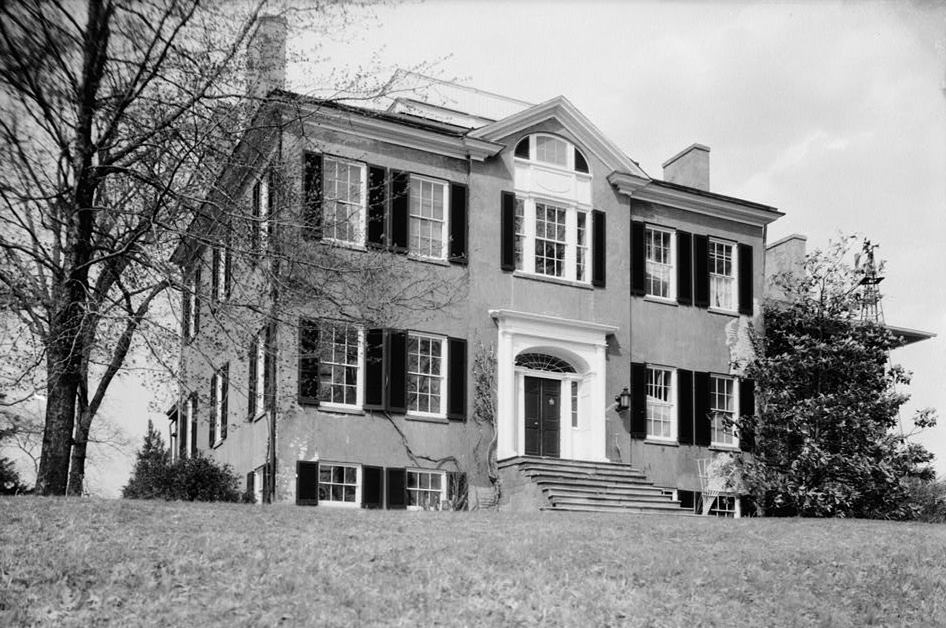
- Bowieville, 1936 HABS photograph

- Location within Maryland Location within the United States
- Location: 522 Church Road South, Upper Marlboro, Maryland
- Coordinates: 38°53′7″N 76°45′8″W
- Built: 1820
- Architectural style: Federal
- NRHP reference No.: 73002167
- Added to NRHP: March 14, 1973

Bowieville is a historic home located near Upper Marlboro in Prince George's County, Maryland, United States. It is an elegant two-part plantation house of the late Federal style, built of brick and covered with stucco. The architectural detail is transitional between the Federal and Greek Revival styles.

Bowieville is one of the finest examples of the Federal style in Prince George's County. Features such as its symmetry, elliptical fanlights at the entry and between the parlors, tripartite windows, bowed rear porch, and other Adamesque details exemplify the Federal style. Bowieville reflects the prosperity of the tobacco economy of Prince George's County, as well as the prominence of the Bowie family. Bowieville once held 54 slaves.

The Bowie family had extensive landholdings in the county and were important politically. Bowieville was built in 1819-20 by Mary Wooton Bowie, daughter of Robert Bowie, Governor of Maryland, on property she inherited from her father, and is very similar in styling to his home, Mattaponi, which is also of brick covered with stucco.

After the death of Mary Bowie in 1825, the plantation was entangled in legal issues until the house was sold in 1846 to William J. Berry, one of the county's wealthiest planters.

Bowieville was listed on the National Register of Historic Places in 1973.
