= John Bowie Sr. =

American colonial (1688–1759)

- Born: 1688; Scotland
- Died: April 1759 (aged 70–71) colonial Maryland
- Occupation: land-owner
- Known for: participated in Continental Congress
- Spouse: Mary Mulliken (m. 1707)
- Children: 7

John Bowie Sr. (1688 – April 1759) was an early settler in colonial Maryland.

== Life ==
Bowie was born in Scotland in 1688 and died in Maryland in April 1759. He was the first of the Bowie family to arrive in colonial Maryland, emigrating from Scotland between 1705 and 1706 and settling near Nottingham, Prince George's County, Maryland on the Patuxent River. He and his wife, Mary Mulliken, established the colonial manor, Brookridge, near Nottingham after their marriage in 1707.

They purchased a large tract of land called "Brooke's Reserve" about two miles from Nottingham for a son, Captain William Bowie, when the son was twenty-one years old. A large brick house called Mattaponi was erected there and later, another built on the foundation of the first. The tract later became known by the name for the house.

== Legacy ==
The Bowie family went on to have extensive landholdings in the county and other colonial areas. They were important politically, and participated in the Continental Congress during the founding of the United States as well as for the founding of Maryland and many other developments during the transitions.

Mary Milliken and John Bowie Sr. were the parents of John Jr., Eleanor, James, Allen, William, Thomas, and Mary. William became Captain William Bowie. They were the grandparents of many notables, including Walter Bowie, Robert Bowie, and James Bowie.
