= John Bowie =

John Bowie may refer to:

- John Bowie (American football) (born 1984), American football player
- John Bowie (fl. 1678), prisoner on the ship St. Michael of Scarborough
- John Bowie Sr. (1688–1759), Scottish-born colonist in Maryland
- John Bowie (publisher) (died 1815), Scottish musician and music publisher
- John Hamilton Bowie (born 1938), Australian chemist
- John Ross Bowie (born 1971), American actor and comedian
- John Bowie (missionary) Doctor, missionary and "Martyr of Blantyre"
