= 1812 Maryland gubernatorial election =

- November 9, 1812
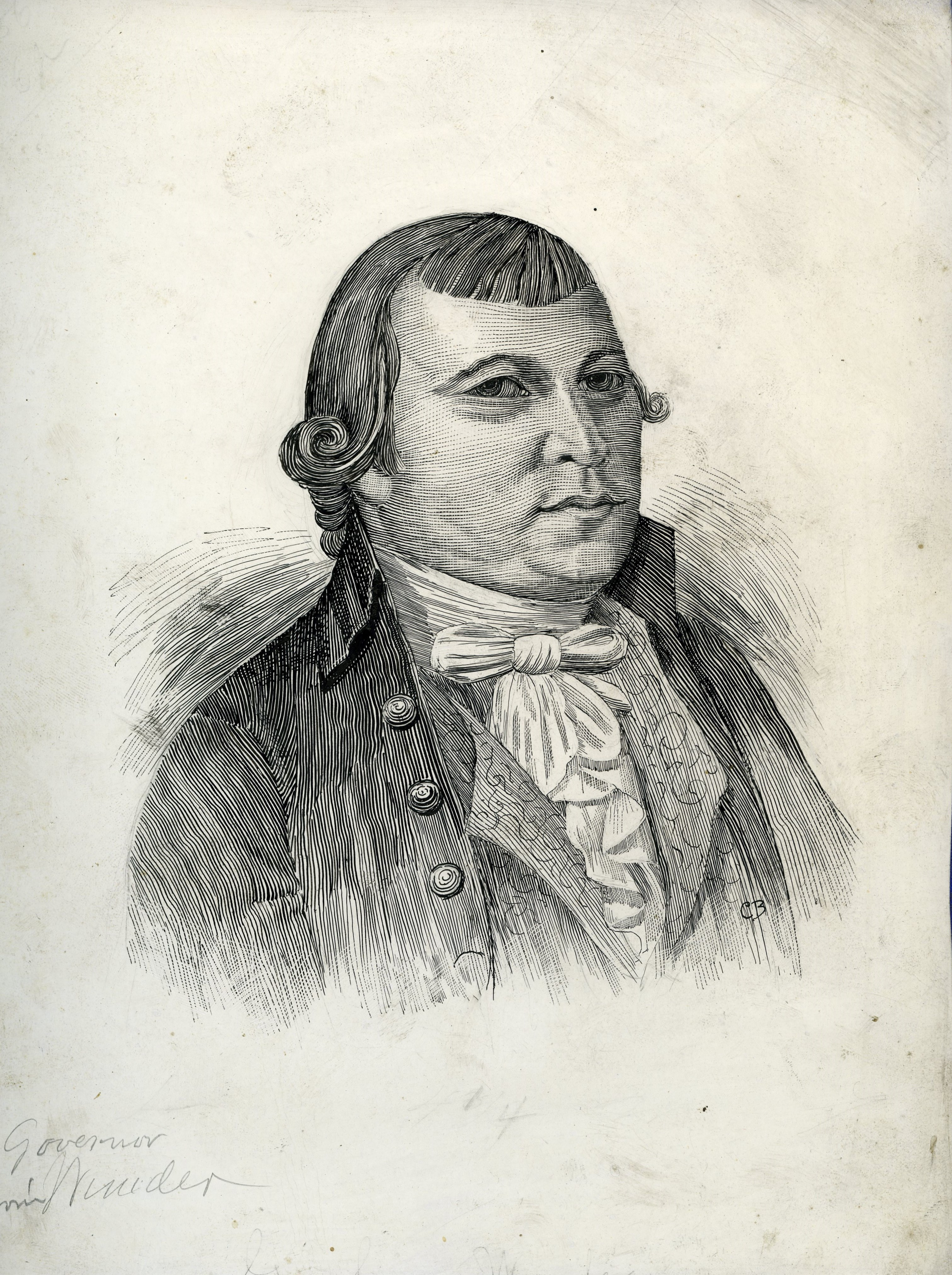

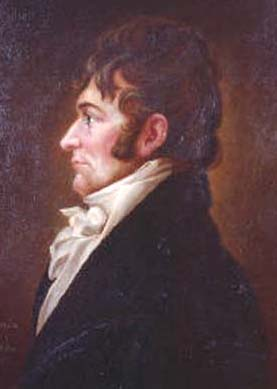
| Nominee | Levin Winder | Robert Bowie |
| Party | Federalist | Democratic-Republican |
| Popular vote | 52 | 29 |
| Percentage | 64.20% | 35.80% |
Governor before election
Robert Bowie
Democratic-Republican
Elected Governor
Levin Winder
Federalist

The 1812 Maryland gubernatorial election was held on November 9, 1812, in order to elect the governor of Maryland. Federalist nominee Levin Winder was elected by the Maryland General Assembly against incumbent Democratic-Republican governor Robert Bowie.

== General election ==
On election day, November 9, 1812, Federalist nominee Levin Winder was elected by the Maryland General Assembly, thereby gaining Federalist control over the office of governor. Winder was sworn in as the 14th governor of Maryland on November 25, 1812.

=== Results ===
Maryland gubernatorial election, 1812
| Party | Candidate | Votes | % |
|---|---|---|---|
| Federalist | Levin Winder | 52 | 64.20 |
| Democratic-Republican | Robert Bowie (incumbent) | 29 | 35.80 |
| Total votes | | 81 | 100.00 |
| Federalist gain from Democratic-Republican | | | |
