= Bowien =

Bowien is a surname. Notable people with the surname include:

- Danny Bowien (born 1982), American chef and businessman
- Jimmy Bowien (born 1933), German record producer, songwriter, and composer
- Erwin Bowien (1899–1972), German Nazi opponent, painter and author

== See also ==
- Bowen (surname)
- Bowie (surname)
