= Mattaponi (John Bowie Jr. House) =

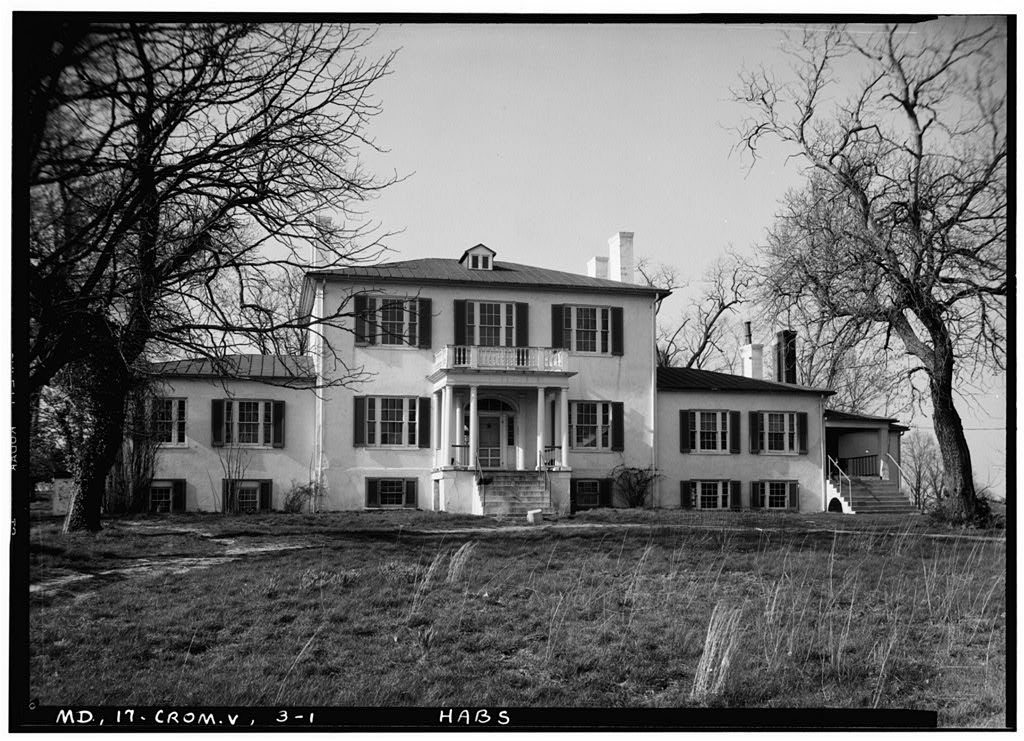
- Interactive map of the Mattaponi area
- Former names: Brooke's Reserve
- Alternative names: John Bowie, Jr. House

General information
- Coordinates: 38°44′20″N 76°44′36″W
- Completed: c. 1820

Mattaponi, also known as the John Bowie Jr. House, is a historic home in Croom, Maryland, built c. 1820 on the foundation of an earlier house dating to the 1730s, three miles northwest of Nottingham, Prince George's County, Maryland.

John Bowie, Sr., who emigrated to colonial Maryland in 1705 from Scotland, purchased a large tract of land called "Brooke's Reserve" about two miles west of Nottingham for a son, Captain William Bowie, when the son was twenty-one years old. A large brick house was erected there that was called Mattaponi, the name of the nearest creek and a Native American word meaning "meeting of the waters". The tract of land later became known by the name for the house. The current house is the second, being built on the foundation of the first. A tribe by the name Mattaponi resided in what would become colonial Virginia.

The Bowie family had extensive landholdings in the county and were important politically. They settled in and near Nottingham during the colonial period, building a number of homes including Mattaponi.

Robert Bowie, Governor of Maryland from 1803 to 1806 and 1811–12, is buried at Mattaponi and is believed to have been born there as well, although this is not proven; as an adult, he made his residence at "The Cedars" in Nottingham on the Patuxent River. Mattaponi is very similar in styling to the home he built nearby for his daughter, Bowieville, also brick covered with stucco.

Walter Bowie also was born at Mattaponi.

In December 1846, Richard Lowndes Ogle married Priscilla Mackall Bowie at Mattaponi.
