= Newtown High School of the Performing Arts =

Secondary school in Newtown, Sydney

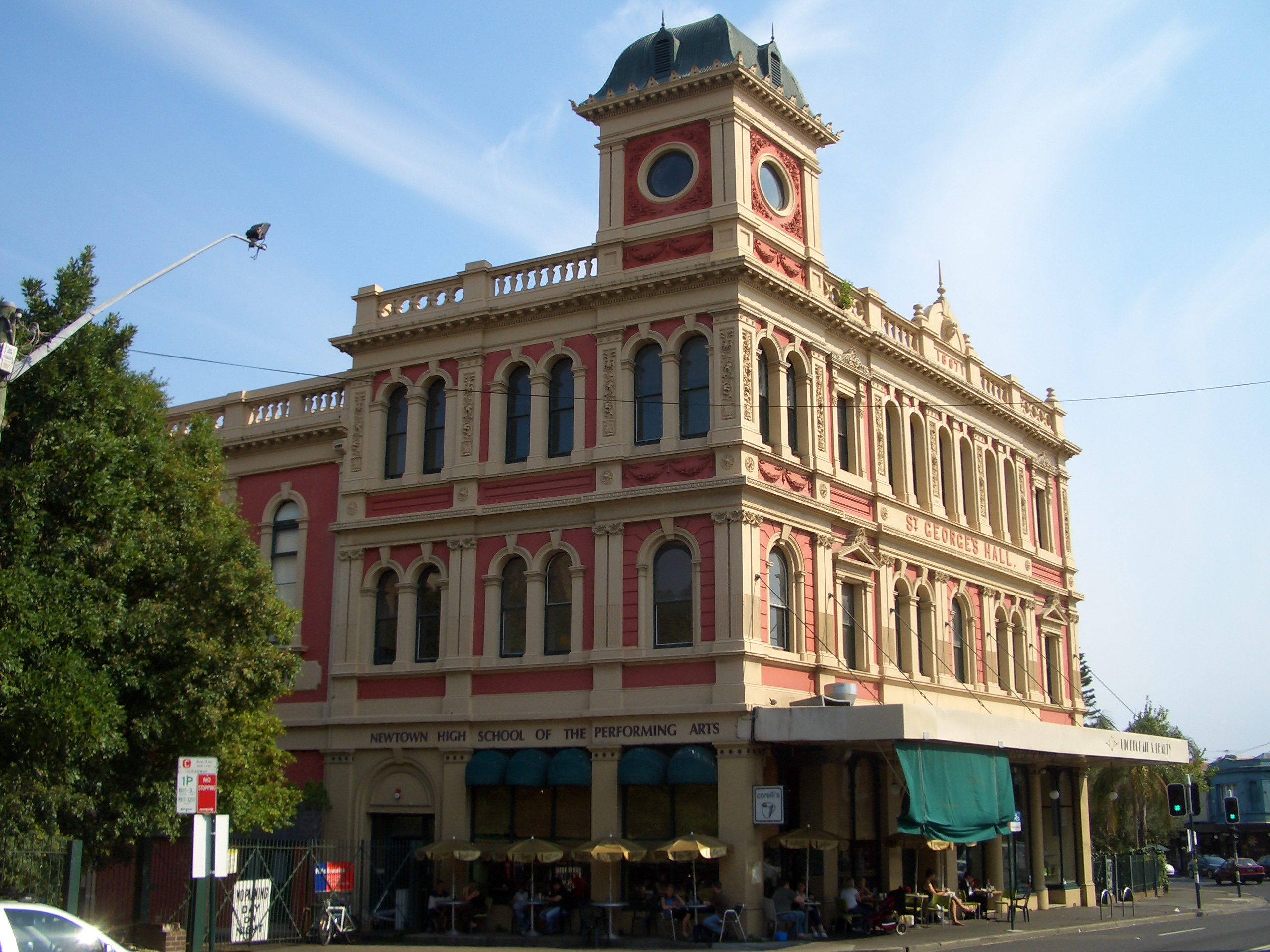
- St George's Hall

Location
- King Street, Newtown, Inner West region of Sydney, New South Wales; Australia; 33°53′58″S 151°10′43″E

Information
- Former names: Newtown Boys High School; Petersham Girls High School
- Type: Government-funded co-educational comprehensive and specialist day school
- Motto: Equity, creativity, excellence
- Established: 1990; 36 years ago
- Educational authority: New South Wales Department of Education
- Specialist: Performing arts
- Principal: Susan Green
- Years: 7–12
- Enrolment: c. 1,000
- Colors: Blue and red
- Website: newtown-h.schools.nsw.gov.au

The Newtown High School of the Performing Arts is a government-funded co-educational comprehensive and specialist secondary day school in the suburb of Newtown in Sydney, New South Wales, Australia. It is among a few performing arts and visual arts schools in Australia. All students must study drama, music, dance and visual arts subjects as part of the curriculum for the first year of secondary school, and one performing or visual arts subject until Year 11. The school participates in variety of events both on and off campus in all types of performing and visual arts as well as video, technical, costume and design.

In 2016, it adopted an 'inclusive' uniform policy, under which there are separate 'boys' and 'girls' uniforms and students may wear whichever they prefer.

The New South Wales Department of Education runs the school. Dr Susan Green has been principal since November 2023.

The school caters for approximately 1,200 students from Year 7 to Year 12.

== History ==
The school remains open and accessible to the local population, however a larger percentage of prospective students from outside the local acceptance boundaries can audition to obtain a place at the school.

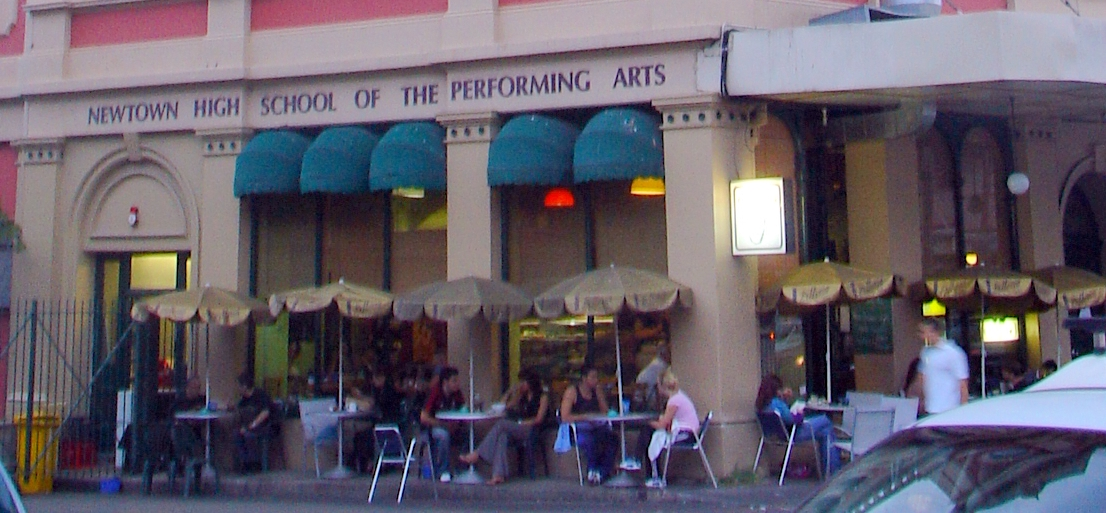
Café by an entrance to the school

Extracurricular activities are available; there are ensembles and companies in the music, drama and dance departments.

== Alumni ==
- Ralph Myers (1996) – artistic director of theatre company Company B Belvoir
- Jac Bowie (1997) – entrepreneur, founder of Business in Heels
- Nathan Foley (1997) – cast member of Hi-5
- Elle Dawe (1998) – actress
- Elana Stone (1998) – jazz singer and band leader
- Abe Forsythe (1999) – actor
- Virginia Gay (1999) – actress
- Tamara Jaber (1999) – recording artist
- Emma Lung (1999) – actress
- Alyssa McClelland (1999) – actress
- Rose Jackson (2002) – former president of the University of Sydney Students' Representative Council and past president of the National Union of Students
- Michael Azzopardi (2002) – musician and Musical Director for shows including Hamilton and MJ The Musical
- Indiana Evans (2003) – actress
- Lindsay Farris (2003) – actor and Artistic Director of the National Youth Theatre Company and founding Chairman of the National Youth Theatre Company Foundation
- Yael Stone (2003) – actress
- Jessica Tovey (2005) – actress
- Jordan 'Friendlyjordies' Shanks (2007) – YouTuber and political commentator
- Paddy Cornwall (2007) – Bass player for indie rock band Sticky Fingers
- Abby Earl (2007) – actress
- Dylan Frost (2008) – Lead singer for indie rock band Sticky Fingers
- David Jones-Roberts (2008) – actor
- Hanna Mangan-Lawrence (2008) – actress
- Julia Jacklin (2008) - solo singer and member of indie garage band Phantastic Ferniture
- Alycia Debnam-Carey (2011) – actress
- Bree Masters (2012) – Olympic sprinter
- Odessa Young (2013) – actress
- Christopher Bahng/Bang (2014) – professionally known as Bang Chan; leader of South Korean boy group Stray Kids under JYP Entertainment
- Claude Scott-Mitchell (2014) – actress
- Bryn Chapman Parish (2015)- actor
- Sophie Wilde (2015) – actress
- Milly Alcock (2018) – actress
- Ed Oxenbould (2019) – actor
- Maya Cumming (2019) – former Internet personality and pop musician known as MAY-A
- Catherine Laga'aia (2025) – actress

== See also ==
- List of government schools in New South Wales
- List of selective high schools in New South Wales
- List of creative and performing arts high schools in New South Wales
