= Bowieite =

Mineral

General
- Category: Sulfide mineral
- Formula: Rh_{2}S_{3}
- Strunz classification: 2.DB.15
- Dana classification: 2.11.12.1
- Crystal system: Orthorhombic

Identification
- Color: Pale-gray to Pale gray-brown
- Luster: Metallic
- Diaphaneity: Opaque

Bowieite is a rhodium-iridium-platinum sulfide mineral (Rh,Ir,Pt)_{2}S_{3}, found in platinum-alloy nuggets from Goodnews Bay, Alaska. It was named (by the IMA in 1984) after the British scientist Stanley Bowie (1917–2008), in recognition of his work on identification of opaque minerals.

The mineral crystallizes in the orthorhombic crystal system (space group Pbcn).
