= Richard Lowndes Ogle =

Prominent American landowner (1819-1895)

- Born: 1819; Belair Mansion
- Died: April 4, 1895 in Baltimore
- Occupation: Plantation Owner

Richard Lowndes Ogle (1819-1895) was the son of Benjamin Ogle II and the grandson of Maryland Governor Benjamin Ogle.

He was a prominent landowner in Prince George's County, Maryland, owning 31 slaves according to the 1860 Slave Schedules. Upon his father's death, in 1844, Richard Ogle and his brother, George Cooke Ogle divided the Belair Estate into two parcels. George took the parcel with the mansion and Richard moved to a house on his parcel known as Bladen (which was torn down in the 1960s to make way for the Kenilworth Elementary School).

He married Priscilla Mackall Bowie (1825–1859) in December 1846 at the Bowie family estate, Mattaponi. Priscilla is buried on the grounds of the Belair Mansion.
