= Leonard Covington =

American politician (1768–1813)

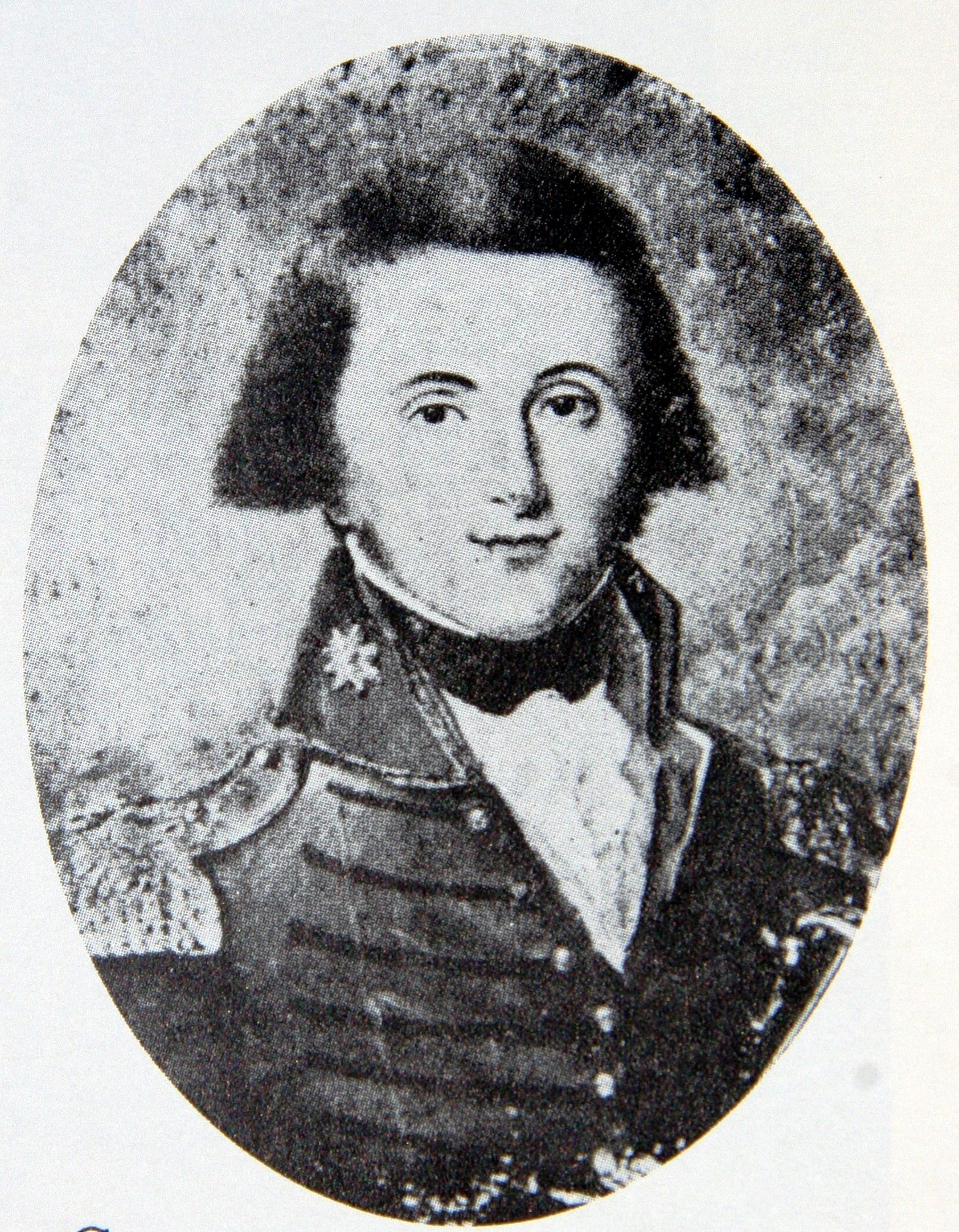

Member of the U.S. House of Representatives from Maryland's 2nd district
- In office March 4, 1805 – March 3, 1807
- Preceded by: Walter Bowie
- Succeeded by: Archibald Van Horne

Personal details
- Born: October 30, 1768 Aquasco, Province of Maryland, British America
- Died: November 14, 1813 (aged 45) French Mills, New York, US
- Spouse: Rebecca Mackall

Military service
- Allegiance: United States
- Years of service: 1792-1795, 1809-1813
- Rank: Brigadier general
- Battles/wars: Northwest Indian War; Siege of Fort Recovery; Battle of Fallen Timbers; War of 1812; Battle of Crysler's Farm †

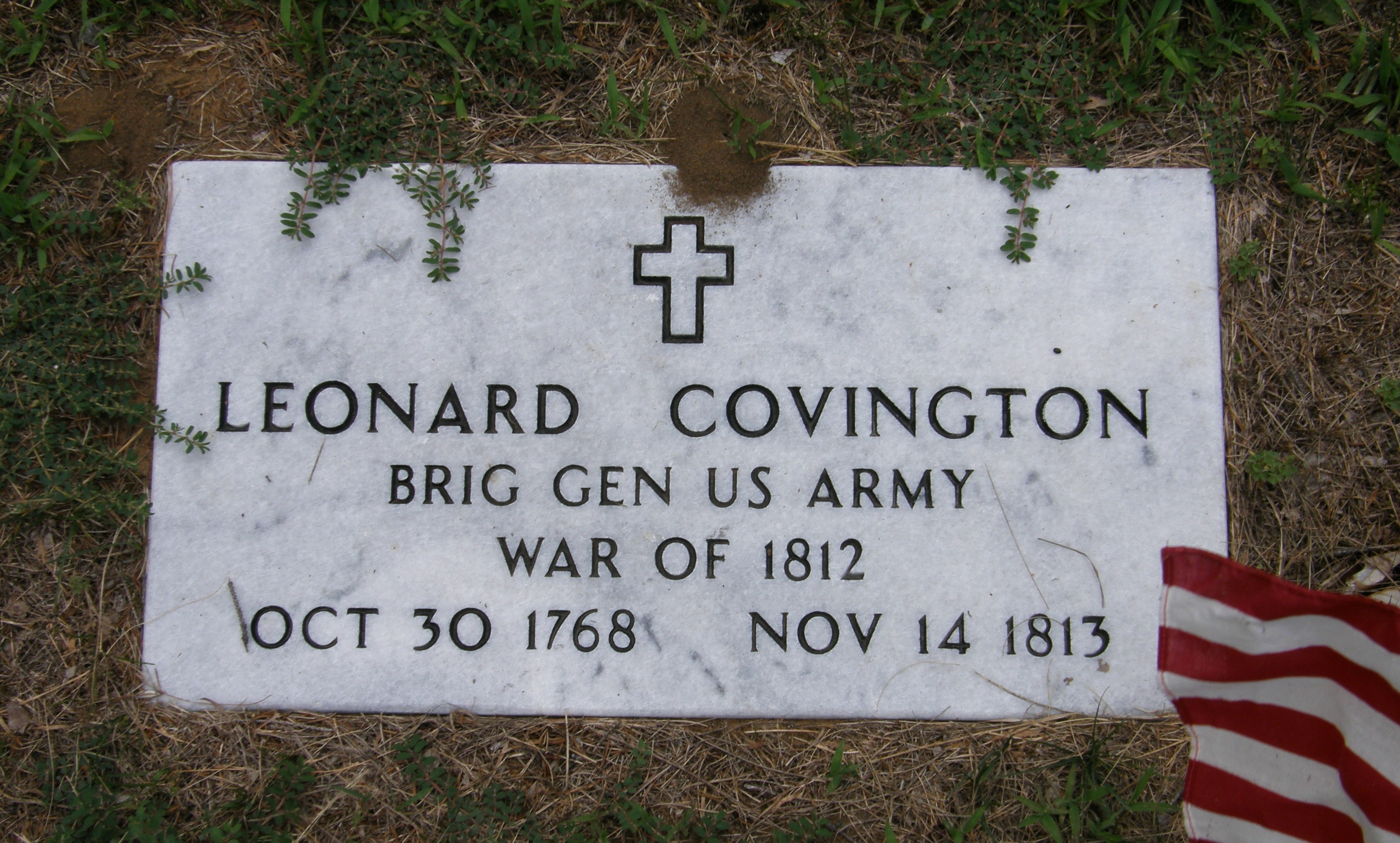
Covington's grave in Sackets Harbor Military Cemetery

Leonard Covington (October 30, 1768 – November 14, 1813) was a United States Army brigadier general and a member of the United States House of Representatives.

== Biography ==
Born in Aquasco, Prince George's County, in what was then the British Province of Maryland, Leonard Covington joined the United States Army as a cornet in March 1792. He was promoted to captain in 1794 and served in the Northwest Indian War (1785–1795) under Anthony Wayne, where he distinguished himself at Fort Recovery and the Battle of Fallen Timbers. He resigned from the military at the conclusion of the Northwest Indian War.

In 1809, Leonard Covington returned to the Army as colonel of light dragoons, having served many years in the Maryland House of Delegates and in 1805–1807 as a Representative (Democratic-Republican Party) in the Ninth Congress. He was in command at Fort Adams on the lower Mississippi River and participated in the December 1810 takeover by the United States of the Republic of West Florida, in today's Florida Parishes, Louisiana. He served in the War of 1812, being promoted to brigadier general in August 1813. Covington was mortally wounded in the Battle of Crysler's Farm and died three days later at French Mills, Franklin County, New York.

At the time of his death, Brig. Gen. Covington and his family were residents of Washington, the capital of the Mississippi Territory, in a home named Propinquity. It was built in 1810 near the military installation Fort Washington (originally Fort Dearborn), where Covington commanded the Regiment of Light Dragoons. Mrs. Leonard Covington was the former Rebecca Mackall, his first cousin and a relative of the family of General James Wilkinson. The Covingtons had at least four children.

== Places named after Covington ==
- Covington, Georgia
- Covington, Kentucky
- Covington, Louisiana
- Port Covington, Maryland
- Covington, New York
- Covington, Ohio
- Covington Township, Tioga County, Pennsylvania
- Covington, Tennessee
- Covington County, Alabama
- Covington County, Mississippi
- Fort Covington, New York
- Covington, Virginia
- Covington Theological Seminary in Rossville, Georgia.

== See also ==
- Leonard Leopold Mackall, Covington's great-great-grandson

U.S. House of Representatives
| Preceded by Walter Bowie | U.S. Congressman, Maryland's 2nd District; 1805—1807 | Succeeded by Archibald Van Horne |
