= Captain William Bowie =

American colonist

Captain William Bowie was an early colonist in the Province of Maryland and an American Revolutionary, a member of the Assembly of Freemen, and a delegate to the Annapolis Convention (1774–1776).

== Early life ==
Captain William Bowie was the son of John Bowie, Sr. and Mary Mulliken. Bowie was born in about 1721 at the home of his parents, Brookridge a few miles from Nottingham in Prince George's County, Maryland. His father purchased a large tract of land about two miles from Nottingham for him when he was twenty one years called "Brooke's Reserve" which later became known as "Mattaponi". Here he erected a large brick house. It is probable that William Bowie commanded one of the militia organizations maintained by the Province though no record of his commission has been discovered.

In 1753 he was appointed tobacco inspector for Nottingham and later a justice of the peace, a member of St Paul's vestry, and in 1767 warden of the parish.

In 1770 it was rumored that ships were en route from Great Britain loaded with European goods and might soon be expected to reach the Patuxent River. The inhabitants of Prince George county thought it necessary to prohibit the landing of these cargoes and called a meeting for April 10, 1770 at Upper Marlboro, selecting representatives to keep an eye upon events and to provide guards at points on the Patuxent where ships were likely to land. Only the most resolute and responsible citizens were delegated by the people for this purpose and the ones for Patuxent or Nottingham were William Bowie and his brother Allen Bowie.

== Assembly of Freemen ==
William Bowie was a delegate sent from Prince George's County to the Annapolis Convention, June 22, 1774 which passed strong resolutions in favor of upholding the rights of the Province if necessary by force of arms against Great Britain. In November of the same year a meeting of freeholders was held at Upper Marlboro where a committee was appointed which was instructed to see that the resolutions of the Continental Congress were enforced within Prince George county Among the men selected for this committee were William Bowie and his brother Allen Bowie as well as Walter Bowie and Robert Bowie who were William's sons.

The latter was also placed on a committee of correspondence and it was further resolved that Captain William Bowie and Walter Bowie with others are selected as delegates of this county to attend a convention to be held at Annapolis and are authorized to vote in the convention for delegates to attend a congress which will assemble at Philadelphia, Pennsylvania on the 10th of May the next year. In June 1775 these representatives met at Annapolis and on July 26, 1775 this convention issued the Declaration of the Association of the Freemen.

On September 12, 1775, he and his son Robert were authorized to enroll a company of minutemen, but what further part Bowie took during the Revolution is unclear.

== Personal life ==
Captain William Bowie married Margaret Sprigg in 1745. They had seven children, Elizabeth born in 1746, Walter Bowie, Robert Bowie, William Bowie, Osborn Sprigg Bowie, Ann Bowie, David Bowie and Margaret Sprigg Bowie.

== Treatment of slaves ==
According to Parson Rezin Williams, bishop of the United Methodist Church who was enslaved by the Bowie family, slaves at Bowie mostly lived in cabins made of slabs running up and down and crudely furnished. Working time was from sunrise until sunset. The slaves had no money to spend and few masters allowed them to indulge in a religious meeting or even learn about the Bible.
