= Stanley Bowie =

Scottish geologist

Stanley Hay Umphray Bowie FRS (born 24 March 1917, in Bixter, Shetland - died 3 September 2008) was a Scottish geologist. He was considered a "world authority on uranium geology and a leader in the field of geochemistry and mineralogy". He developed methods and tools to identify opaque minerals using micro-indentation hardness and optical reflectance. He worked for the British Geological Survey between 1946 and 1977. The mineral bowieite was so named in recognition of his work on identification of opaque minerals.
