= Fiona Bowie =

Canadian artist

Fiona Bowie is a Vancouver-based Canadian installation artist. She uses film, video, photography and sculpture, and makes "immersive environments".

== Life and work ==
Fiona Bowie graduated from University of British Columbia (BFA) in 1990 and from the School of Contemporary Art at Simon Fraser University (MFA) in 1998. From 1998 to 2000, Bowie was a co-curator of the Western Front Society Exhibitions Program, and was the editor of ~scope, the exhibition catalogue of the 2001 Western Front Exhibitions Program. From 2012 to 2020, she created, constructed and directed (and operated her studio from) Orbitas, a Residency in Sámara, Costa Rica, where international artists and curators visited in order to work on research-based projects.

Bowie is Professor Emeritus, Media Arts, Emily Carr University, where she taught across faculties in both the undergraduate and graduate degree programs.

== Public art works ==
=== Surface ===
In 2010, Bowie created Surface, an ongoing live documentary of the underwater life of False Creek. False Creek is a short inlet in the heart of Vancouver. Once teeming with marine life, it was heavily industrialized in the early 20th century. Now starting to rebound, the inlet supports seabirds such as cormorants, ducks, herons, kingfishers. Herring and other sealife are now populating the inlet, though in comparatively small numbers.

The live documentary is transmitted from a camera mounted underneath an Aquabus (a commuter ferry servicing Science World, Yaletown and Granville Island ) via a Wireless mesh network to an LED screen mounted on the water side of Ocean Concrete, one of the last industrial businesses still operating on False Creek. The live video stream of surface is broadcast via the mesh network online at www.surfacer.ca, allowing remote viewing and enabling visitors to False Creek to watch the stream on their smart phones as the Aquabus passes by.

Bowie emphasizes that Surface is meant to reflect the current state of the underwater flora and fauna, rather than serve as entertainment typical of glass bottom boats in Marine Parks or the collections of public aquariums. Bowie chose this body of water for Surface to serve as an analogy of environmental pressures affecting marine life, such as the Great Pacific Garbage Patch in the North Pacific Gyre. "Surface will evolve over time, reflecting the health of marine life as evidence of our collective activity: the future of the work and what is manifest, is wholly dependent on us." – Fiona Bowie

=== Flow ===
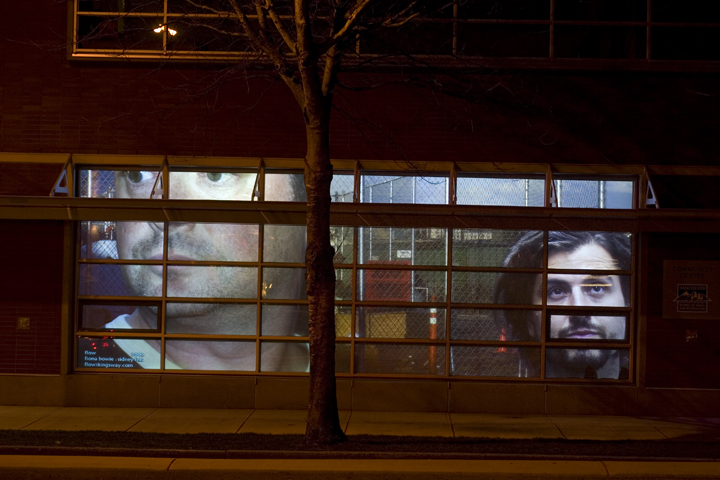
Still from "Flow"

In 2009, Bowie's "Flow" opened at the Civic Centre at 1 Kingsway. Vancouver's first video/photography-based permanent public art installation. Flow, produced by Bowie with Sidney Fels, a University of British Columbia computer scientist, was commissioned by the City of Vancouver. Rebecca Belmore, initially part of the artist team, could not participate in the project due to time constraints.

This was the first permanent installation of timebased photo and media work in the City of Vancouver. Flow is a continually changing mise-en-scène that uses open source software to access a library of images shot by Bowie over a period of four years. Made up of hundreds of portraits and landscapes, the work has been programmed so that 'figures shot at different times appear as if they simultaneously present, with a core group of these figures or actors recurring in a manner that implicitly suggests they're part of a larger narrative'.

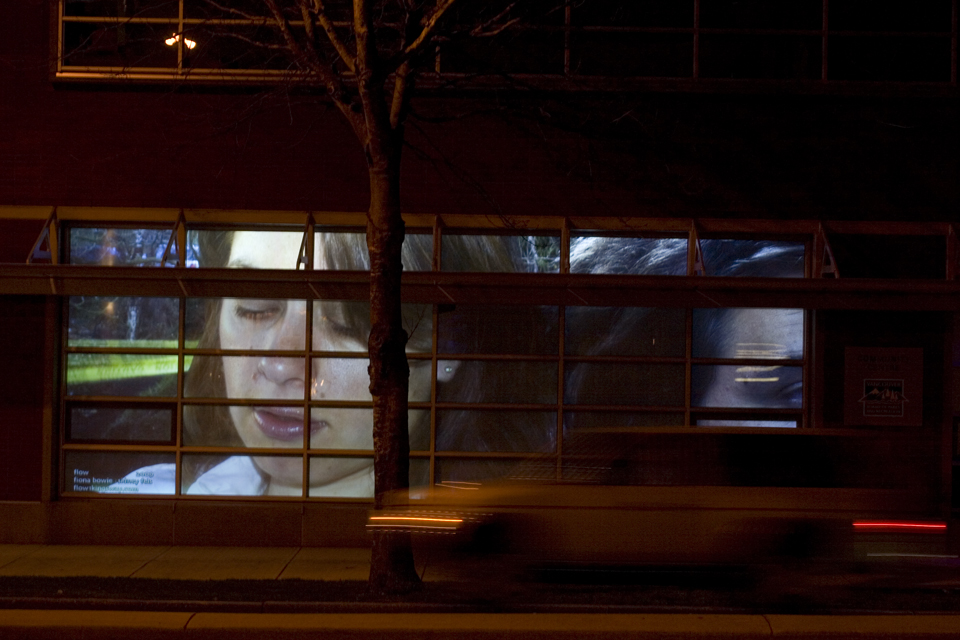
Still from "Flow"

The landscapes photographed as backgrounds for the evolving tableaus were landscapes in a state of transition from one thing to another: building sites, fallow lands, hurricane scapes, and Vancouver Archive historical photographs of newly colonized and deforested areas of the unceded and ancestral territories of the xwməθkwəy̓əm (Musqueam), Skwxwú7mesh (Squamish) and Səl̓ílwətaʔ/Selilwitulh (Tsleil-Waututh) Nations in the neighbourhood of Main Street in East Vancouver where the public artwork is installed.

As the viewer draws close to the image, the special glass projection material, Smart glass, causes portions of the imagery to disappear as the projection surface switches from translucent to clear, fragmenting the image and frustrating its coherence: the immediate environment suddenly becomes part of the mis en scene. Thus the viewer is suddenly transitioned from a conventional indexical observer to the here and now; experiencing their immediate environment. Another feature of the work that speaks to the construction and fragility of the image(es), is the rate at which transitions occur from one image (such as a particular individual or background layer of the tableau) to another. These transitions can last up to two minutes, causing individuals pictured or the backgrounds they are set upon to disappear very gradually: creating ghost-like residues of once crisp images as they fade away.

"Flow" also has an interactive web component where visitors are encouraged to add dialogue to images captured from a live feed of the work.

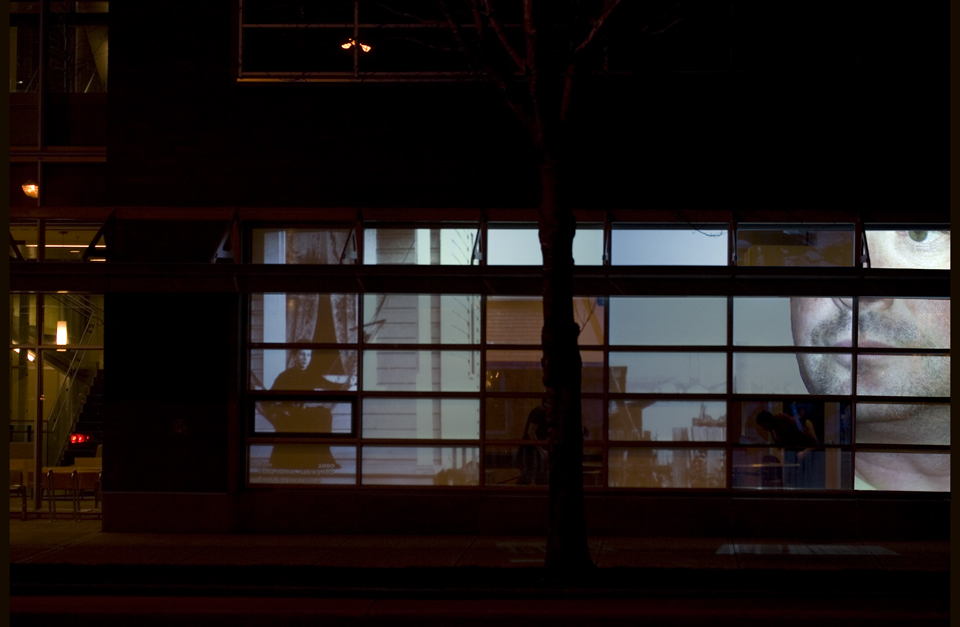
Still from "Flow", showing Smart glass activated by inside room use

The dialogue consists of phrases penned by Bowie and bands such as the New Pornographers and The Residents. Once images and dialogue are captured by visitors to the site, these are preserved as stills in the websites archive

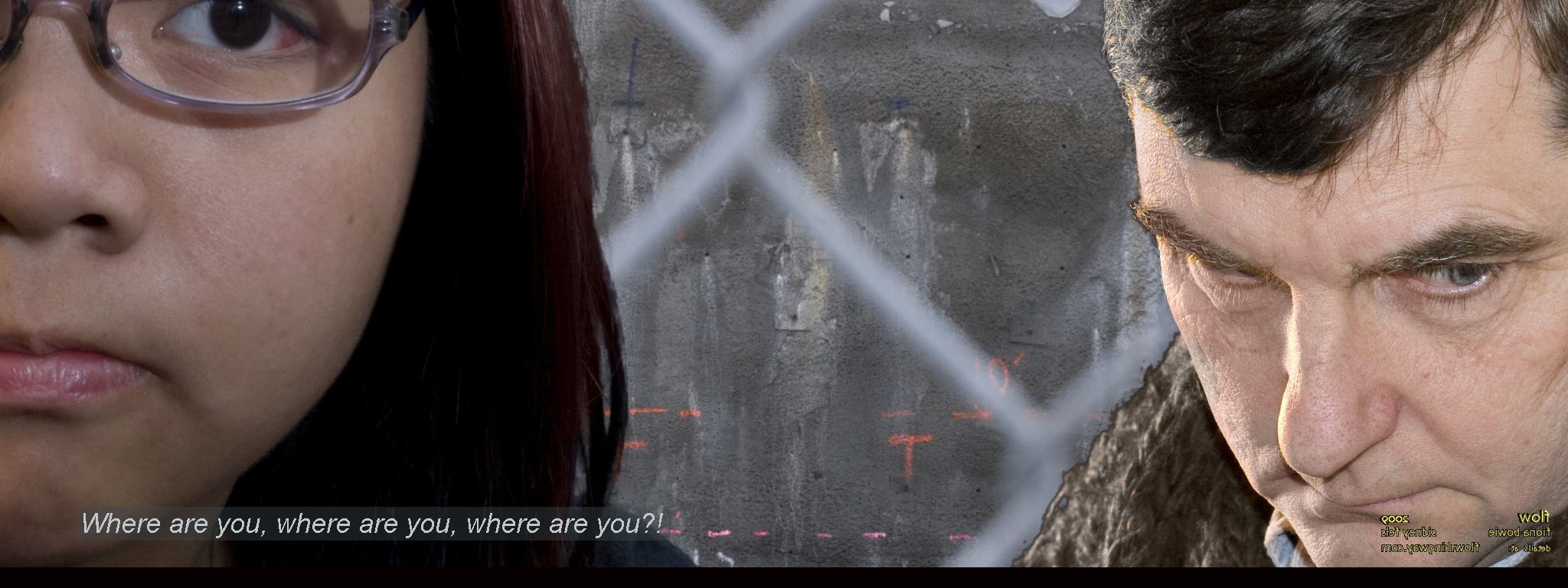
Website interaction from "Flow"

== Gallery art works ==
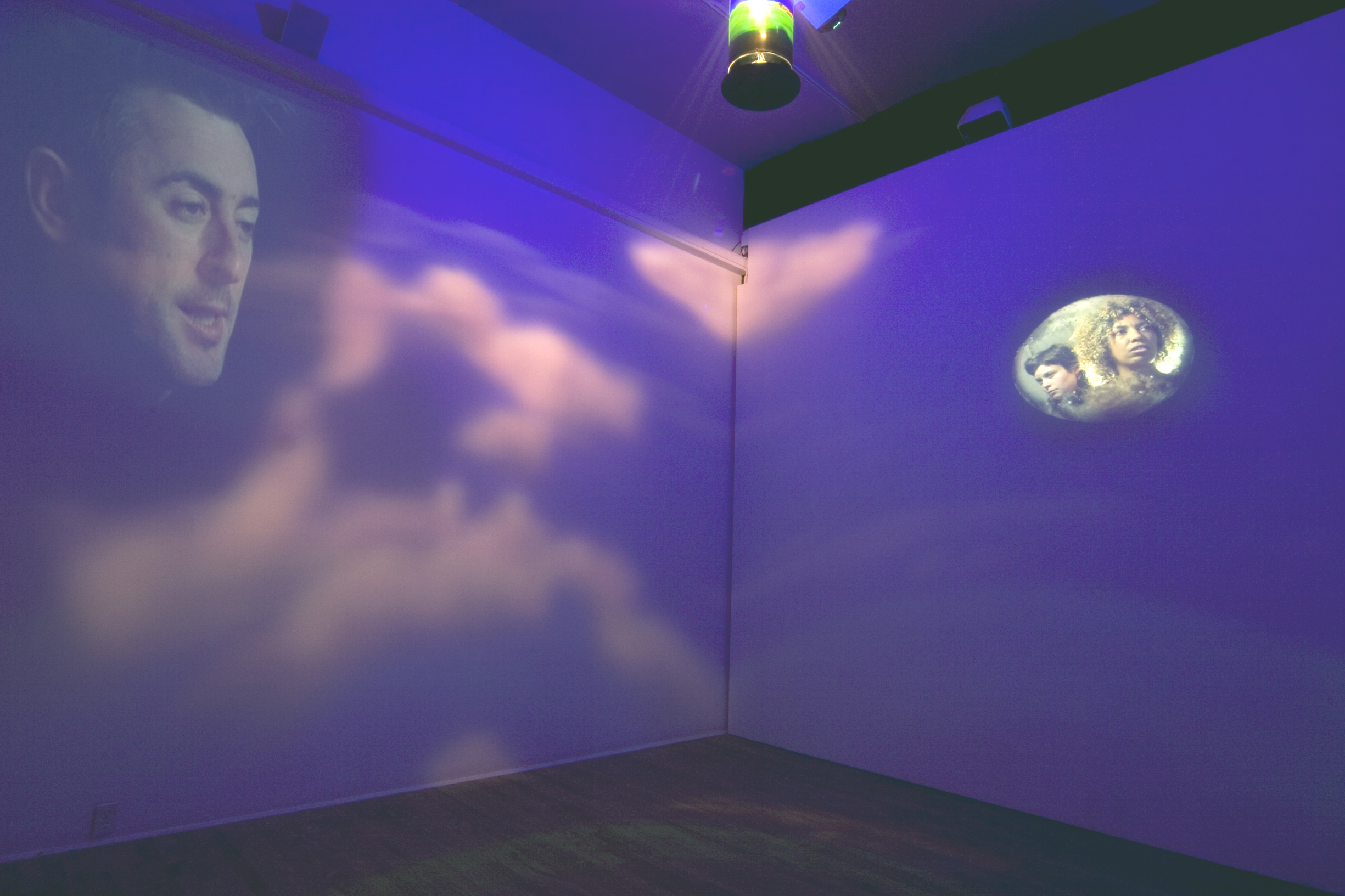
Still from "Sliphost"

In March 2007, Sliphost (2006), featuring Alan Cumming in the two lead roles, was exhibited at the Western Front Society Exhibitions Program in Vancouver and exhibited in November 2007 at Open Space in Victoria. Curated by Candice Hopkins, she said of the work: "Sliphost plays with conventions of media, narrative, and scale and draws on the reciprocities between two disparate worlds to reconsider notions of consciousness, consumption, beauty and oblivion." According to Bowie:

Sliphost relies on dark surreal humour to suggest reciprocal relationships between earthly life forms and human action and experience.

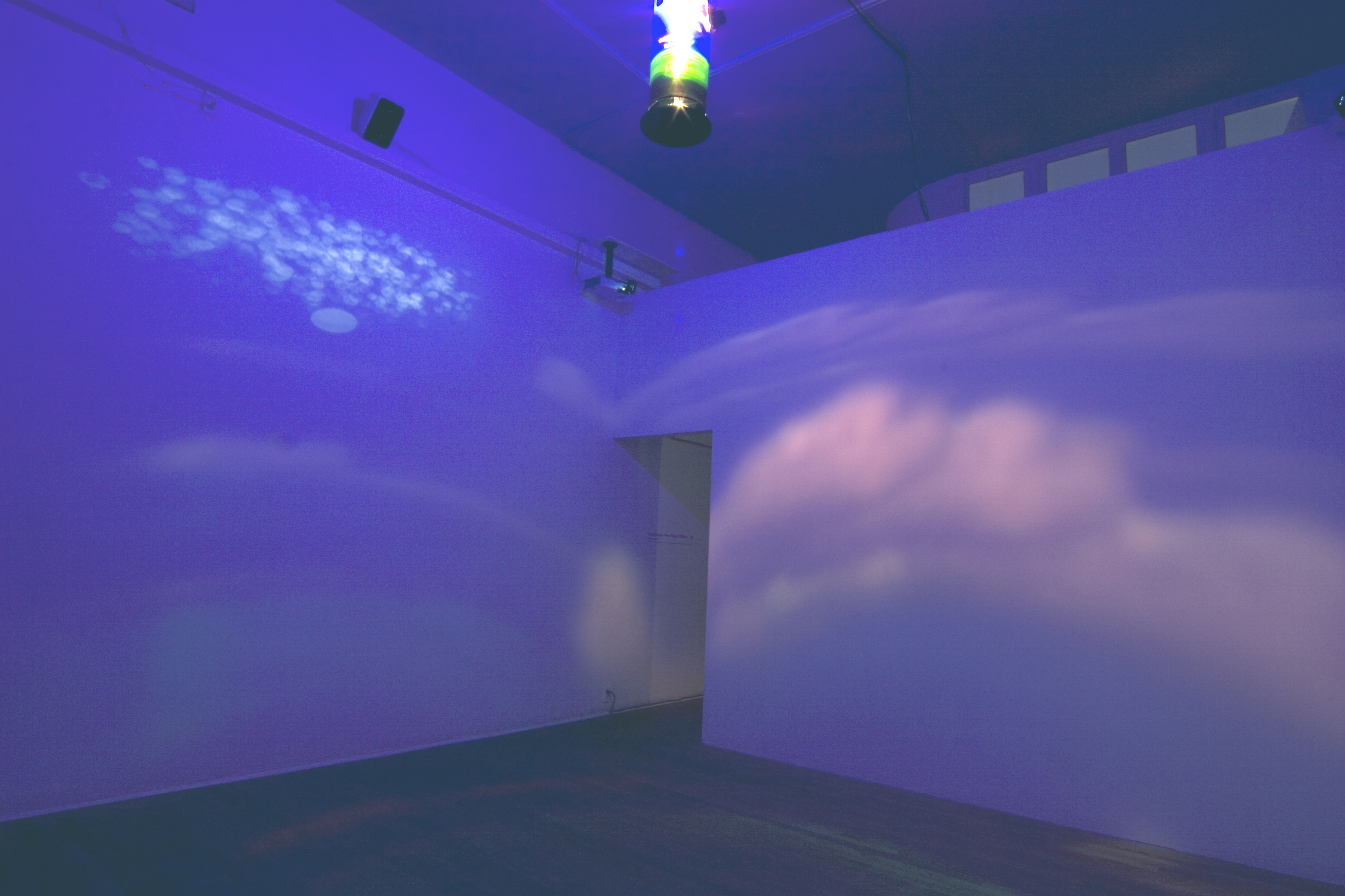
Still from "Sliphost"

Bowie has several works that are created and added to over periods of time, such as Phenotypes (2001, 2002, 2003, 2004). 'Conceptually, the work is an ongoing installation. Each year, another narrative aspect is added to the visual record to mirror the flux of an individual dwelling or neighbourhood over time. Each time it is exhibited, the artist chooses which particular years (or chapters) of activity are represented.' , Subsequent exhibitions of the work in 2004 in Vancouver and 2007 in Whitehorse presented entirely different sets of narratives set within the same Cul-de-sac setting.

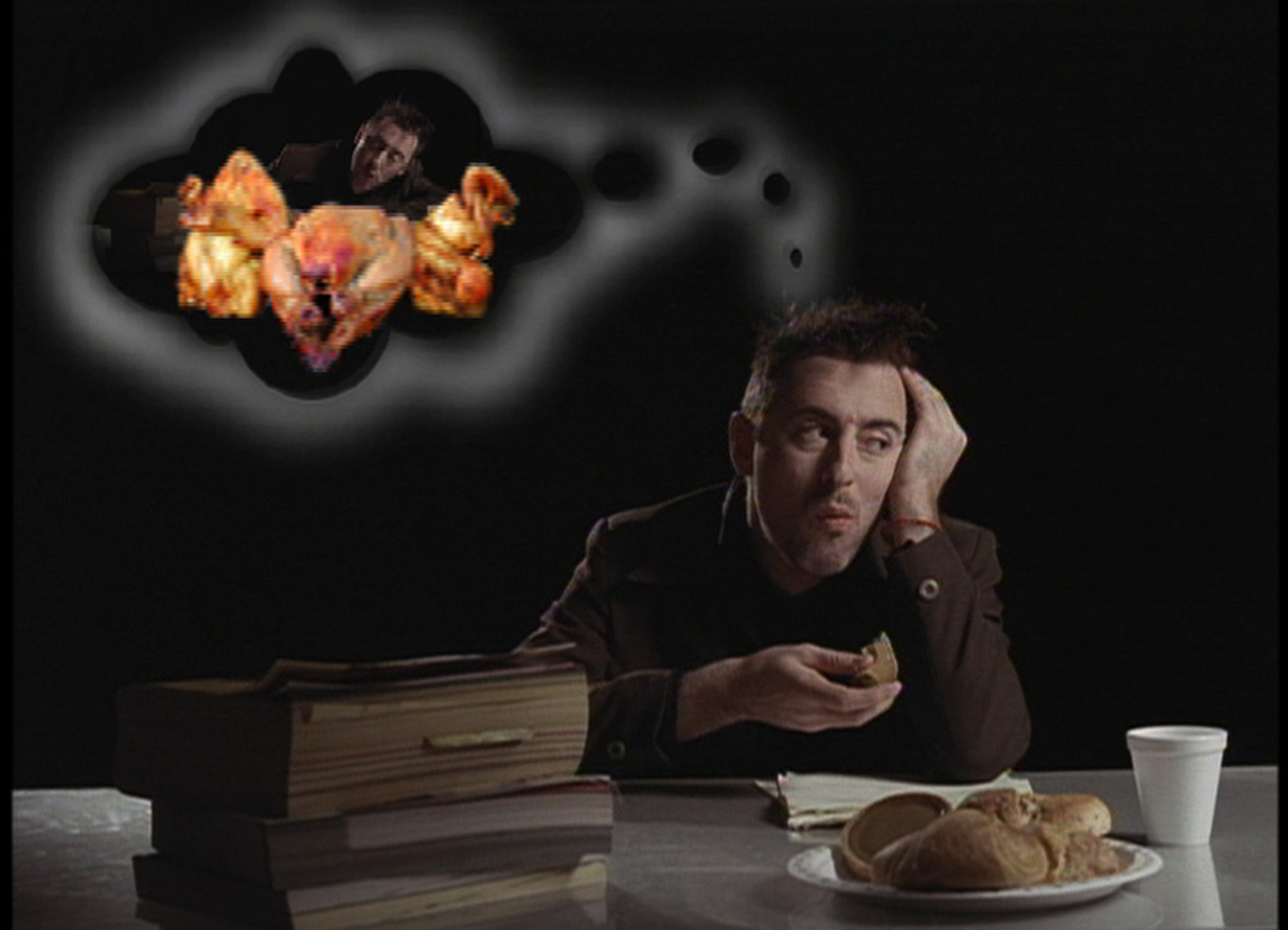
Sedentary Manufacturer from "Sliphost"

In 2001, Bowie created "Faltering Repetition", a synchronous multichannel photo-video based narrative work that used a 360 degree projector to create the backdrop setting for the work. This work, portraying a chance conversation between two strangers at a traffic intersection, used separate, non-diegetic sound feeds to represent the setting and the dialogue of the characters. Bowie has created several works using this template including 'deliverance' (1998), 'Phenotypes'(ongoing), Nature Morte (2005) and 'Sliphost' (2006).

== Music ==
In 2008, Bowie formed SLickerslacker with ex-Chopper bandmate Jim Peers. SLickerslacker debuted at Light Bar, a series of art and music events curated by the Canadian collective Instant Coffee, featuring contemporary visual artists. Bowie was bass player, songwriter and singer for the Vancouver three piece Chopper from 2000 to 2007. Absence, a commissioned soundtrack composition was performed live at Songroom in June 2006, by Jim Peers (Free Radicals), Stephen Taylor (trike).

== Exhibitions ==
Bowie's work has been exhibited at:

- Or Gallery Vancouver, BC. (2017)
- Western Gallery, Bellingham, Washington (2017).
- Libby Leshgold Gallery (formally Charles H. Scott Gallery) (2012), The Voyage, or Three Years at Sea Part III. curated by Cate Rimmer
  - Pacific Cinematheque (2009)
  - Open Space Gallery Victoria (2007)
- Yukon Arts Centre Museum (2007),
- Western Front (2007)
- Belkin Satellite (2006),
- Pendulum Gallery, Vancouver (2006)
- New Media Symposium (2004)
- New Forms Festival (2004)
- Consolidated Works, Seattle, Washington (2002)
- Presentation House Gallery (2001)
- The Vancouver Art Gallery (2001)
- A Prior Video-Salon. VandeVelde, Brussels, Belgium (2000)
- Or Gallery (1998)
- grunt gallery (1996)
- A major installation as part of Tamto Misto - Five Vancouver Artists. Galerie Mladych u Recickych, Prague, Czech Republic (1995).

== Publications and reviews ==
- Mullen, Sean with Hsieh, Esther. Radio Interview of Fiona Bowie on Public Artwork Flow, 2009. Live radio interview December 2009, released for podcast on Rabble.ca, 2010 : http://rabble.ca/podcasts/shows/redeye/2010/01/flow-permanent-media-art-exhibit
- Keenlyside, Sarah. Surface, Documentary film on Fiona Bowie's Surface, 2009. released for broadcast on Knowledge Network, Air Canada, City of Vancouver
- Hiebert, Ted. "Fifth Iteration: Digital Dreams and Delusions", from Behind the Screen: Installation from the Interactive Future, Springer Berlin Heidelberg, 2008.ISSN 1865-0929 (Print) ISSN 1865-0937 (Online)https://web.archive.org/web/20110724092559/http://www.tedhiebert.net/site/downloads/writings/behind.pdf
- Randy Adams, Steve Gibson, Stefan Muller, eds. Transcisciplinary Digital Art. Sound, Vision and the New Screen Springer Berlin Heidelberg, 2008.
- Cutler, Randy Lee. Vancouver Singular Plural Vancouver Art and Economies, Arsenal Pulp Press, 2007.
- Burnham, Clint. Vancouver, Akimbo, March 29, 2007.
- Burnham, Clint. "Compelling Look at how Artists use Video". Vancouver Sun, June 29, 2006.
- New Forms, exhibition catalogue, 2004.
- Devuono, Frances. "Binocular Parallax at Consolidated Works," in Artweek, December, 2002.
- Hall, Emily. "A Tale of Two Cities." The Stranger, Seattle, September 26, 2002.
- Hackett, Regina. "Binocular Parallax." Seattle Post-Intelligencer, September 20, 2002.
- Turner, Micheal. "These Days". Art/Text, No. 75., 2001-2.
- Roy, Marina."These Days". Last Call Fall issue. Morris and Helen Belkin Art Gallery Publication.
- Turner, Michael. "These Days". Mix magazine 26.1 Fall, 2001.
- O'Brien, Melanie. "Mis.Com.". Last Call Summer issue, 2001 . Morris and Helen Belkin Art Gallery Publication.
- Henry, Karen. "Mis.Com.". Presentation House Exhibition Monograph, 2001.
- Green, Bethany. "Killing the Commute". ARTSCULTURE, 2000. Brock University Press.
- Mix magazine 26.1 summer 2000.
- Achong, Deanne. "deliverance", OR Gallery Monograph. 1998
- Sawyer, Carol. "swell". grunt Publication Monograph.1996 ISBN 1-895329-27-2

== Notes and references ==
- Flow, City of Vancouver News Release
- Burnham, in Ambiko
- Public Library Public Art
- commsvcs/oca/publicart/projects.htm City of Vancouver Public Art Projects
