= Alistair Bowie =

Scottish footballer

Personal information
- Full name: Alistair Morgan Bowie
- Date of birth: 20 April 1951 (age 75)
- Place of birth: Kelvingrove, Scotland
- Positions: Centre half; midfielder

Youth career
- Glasgow University

Senior career*
| Years | Team | Apps | (Gls) |
| 1973–1980 | Queen's Park | 127 | (1) |
- * Club domestic league appearances and goals

Alistair Morgan Bowie (born 20 April 1951) is a Scottish retired amateur football centre half and midfielder who made over 120 appearances in the Scottish League for Queen's Park.
