= John Bowie (publisher) =

- Died: 1815
- Occupations: musician and music publisher

John Bowie (died 1815) was a musician and music publisher based in Perth, Scotland. Per the 1900 reference work British music publishers, printers and engravers: London, provincial, Scottish, and Irish: From Queen Elizabeth's reign to George the Fourth's, with select bibliographical lists of musical works printed and published within that period:

Bowie & Hill. The senior partner was John Bowie, a Perth musician, who, as Mr. Glen points out in his "Scottish Dance Music," entered into business with T. Hill, in 1803, at a shop in George Street. John Bowie died in 1815, but Mr. Glen quotes an advertisement showing that Hill continued the business alone. Bowie & Hill do not appear to have published very largely. One sheet in my own library is "Four New Tunes, for the pianoforte or violin, published by John Bowie, with the permission of the different composers, Edinburgh, printed for and sold by Bowie & Hill, music sellers, Perth"; it contains a waltz, with the statement that it was danced on June 1st, 1803.
