= Walter Bowie =

American politician (1748–1810)

Member of the U.S. House of Representatives from Maryland's 2nd district
- In office March 24, 1802 – March 3, 1805
- Preceded by: Richard Sprigg Jr.
- Succeeded by: Leonard Covington

Member of the Maryland Senate
- In office 1800–1802

Member of the Maryland House of Delegates
- In office 1780–1800

Personal details
- Born: October 15, 1748 Prince George's County, Province of Maryland, British America
- Died: November 9, 1810 (aged 62) Collington, Maryland, U.S.
- Party: Democratic-Republican

Walter Bowie (October 15, 1748 – November 9, 1810) was an American planter and politician.

== Biography ==
Born in Mattaponi, near Nottingham, Prince George's County, Maryland, Bowie attended Reverend John Eversfield's School near Nottingham, the common schools in Annapolis, and Craddock’s School near Baltimore. His father, Captain William Bowie bought him a large farm near Collington, Maryland, known originally as "Darnell's Grove" and later as "Locust Grove" and "Willow Grove". He engaged in agricultural pursuits, was a large landowner, and also was interested in shipping. He was a slave owner. He served as one of four members of the Maryland constitutional convention from Prince George's County in November 1776.

During the American Revolutionary War, Bowie served as captain and later major of a Prince George's County company. He was a member of the Maryland House of Delegates from 1780 to 1800 and served in the Maryland State Senate from 1800 to 1802. He was elected as a Republican to the 7th United States Congress to fill the vacancy caused by the resignation of Richard Sprigg, Jr., was reelected to the 8th United States Congress, and served from March 24, 1802 to March 3, 1805. He declined to be a candidate for renomination in 1804 to the 9th United States Congress, and died near Collington in Prince George's County. He is interred in the family burying ground on his estate.

== See also ==
- Colonial families of Maryland

U.S. House of Representatives
Preceded by Richard Sprigg, Jr.	Member of the U.S. House of Representatives from Maryland's 2nd congressional district 1802–1805	Succeeded by Leonard Covington
