= Levin Winder =

American politician and military officer (1757-1819)

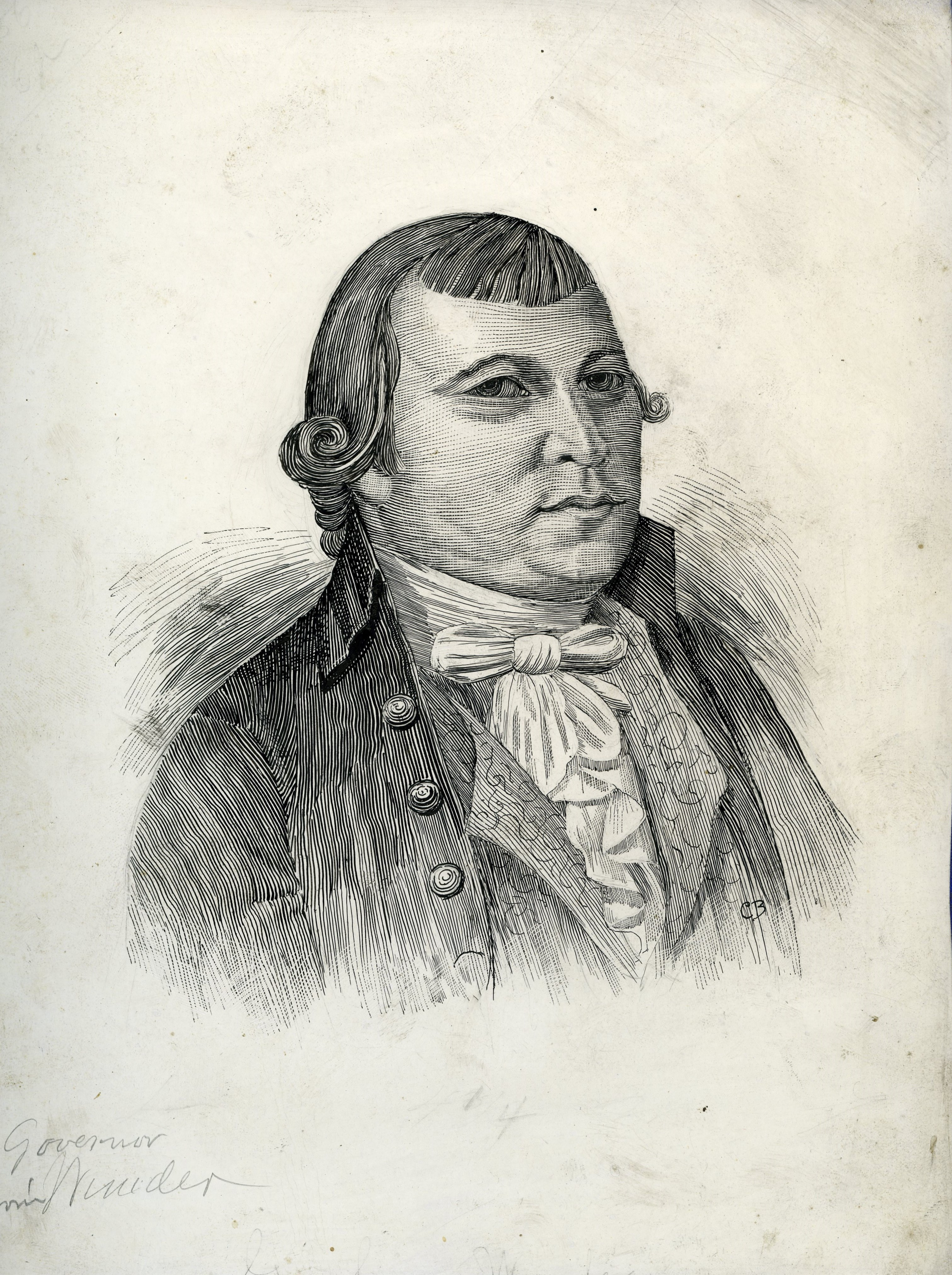
- 1814 portrait

14th Governor of Maryland
- In office November 25, 1812 – January 2, 1816
- Preceded by: Robert Bowie
- Succeeded by: Charles Carnan Ridgely

Personal details
- Born: September 4, 1757 Somerset County, Province of Maryland, British America
- Died: July 1, 1819 (aged 61) Baltimore, Maryland, U.S.
- Resting place: First Presbyterian Church Cemetery, Baltimore
- Party: Federalist
- Spouse: Mary Staughton Sloss (1790–?)
- Children: 3
- Parents: William Winder (1714/15–1792) (father); Esther (Gillis) Winder (mother)

Levin Winder (September 4, 1757 – July 1, 1819) was an American politician and military officer. During the Revolutionary War, he was appointed major of the 4th Maryland Regiment, finally attaining the rank of lieutenant colonel at war's end. After the war, he served with the Maryland Militia at the rank of brigadier general.

Winder served as the 14th governor of the state of Maryland in the United States from 1812 to 1816. He also served in the Maryland House of Delegates from 1789 to 1793. Winder was admitted as an original member of The Society of the Cincinnati of Maryland.

Political offices
Preceded by George Dent	Speaker of the Maryland House of Delegates; 1791–1793	Succeeded by John Parnham
Preceded by Tobias E. Stansbury	Speaker of the Maryland House of Delegates; 1808–1809	Succeeded by Tobias E. Stansbury
Preceded by Robert Bowie	Governor of Maryland; 1812–1816	Succeeded by Charles Carnan Ridgely
