= Robert Bowie =

American politician (1750-1818)

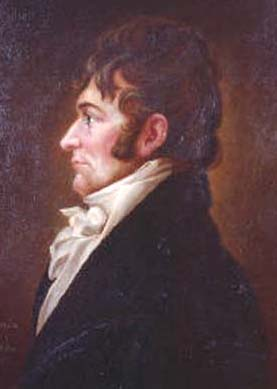

Governor of Maryland
- In office November 16, 1811 – November 23, 1812
- Preceded by: Edward Lloyd V
- Succeeded by: Levin Winder
- In office November 15, 1803 – November 12, 1806
- Preceded by: John Francis Mercer
- Succeeded by: Robert Wright

Member of the Maryland House of Delegates
- In office 1785–1790
- In office 1801–1803

Personal details
- Born: March 1750 Prince George's County, Province of Maryland, British America
- Died: January 8, 1818 (aged 67) Prince George's County, Maryland, U.S.
- Party: Democratic-Republican

Robert Bowie (March 1750 – January 8, 1818) was an American politician who served as the 11th governor of the state of Maryland in the United States, from 1803 to 1806, and from 1811 to 1812.

He was the third child born to Captain William Bowie and Margaret Sprigg, at Mattaponi. He graduated from Charlotte Hall Military Academy.

He also served in the Maryland House of Delegates from 1785 to 1790, and from 1801 to 1803.

Political offices
Preceded by John Francis Mercer	Governor of Maryland; 1803–1806	Succeeded by Robert Wright
Preceded by Edward Lloyd V	Governor of Maryland; 1811–1812	Succeeded by Levin Winder
