= Dent =

Dent may refer to:

== People ==
- Dent (surname)
- Dent May, stage name of American musician James Dent May Jr. (born 1985)
- Dent Mowrey (1888–1960), American composer, musician and music teacher
- Dent Oliver (1918–1973), international speedway rider

== Places ==
=== United Kingdom ===
- Dent (fell), near England's Lake District in Cleator Moor, Copeland, Cumbria
- Dent, Cumbria, a village near Sedbergh in Cumbria
  - Dent railway station
- Dent Fault, northern England
- Dent Group, a group of Upper Ordovician sedimentary and volcanic rocks in northwest England

=== United States ===
- Dent, Idaho, an unincorporated community
- Dent, Minnesota, a city
- Dent, Missouri, an unincorporated community
- Dent, Ohio, a census-designated place
- Dent, West Virginia, a census-designated place
- Dent Township (disambiguation)
- Dent Bridge, Idaho
- Dent County, Missouri
- Dent site, a Clovis culture site near Milliken, Colorado
- Fort Dent

=== Arts and entertainment ===
- Dent (Pokémon), the Japanese name for a gym leader in Pokémon Black and White, named Cilan in English
- Dent (Pokémon anime), the Japanese name for a main character in the Pokémon: Black & White anime series, named Cilan in English
- Arthur Dent, protagonist of the science fiction series The Hitchhiker's Guide to the Galaxy
- Harvey Dent, aka Two-Face, a DC Comics Batman villain
- Dent (band), an American experimental metal band

== Companies ==
- Dent (clocks and watches), the manufacturer of London's Big Ben
- Dent & Co., a major trading company in Hong Kong's early colonial days
- Dents, a British leather goods company founded in 1777
- J. M. Dent & Sons, a British publishing company founded by J. M. Dent in 1888

== Other uses ==
- Dent (conference), an annual leadership conference in Sun Valley, Idaho
- Dent Corn, a variety of maize with a high soft starch content
- USS Dent (DD-116), a United States Navy ship

== See also ==
- Dent Island (disambiguation)
- Denting, Moselle, France
- Denton (disambiguation)
