= Dent (surname) =

- Pronunciation: /dɛnt/
- Language: English

Origin
- Languages: Old English; Old French
- Origin: Habitational (from Dent, Yorkshire/Cumbria) or descriptive nickname (Old French *dent*, "tooth")
- Meaning: From a valley; or "tooth"
- Region of origin: England with diaspora to United States, Australia, etc.

Other names
- Variant forms: Dente, Dentt, Dente, Dentith, Dennett

Dent is an English surname with two primary origins: a habitational name from places called Dent in Yorkshire and Cumbria, and a nickname derived from the Old French word dent meaning "tooth".

== Etymology and origin ==
The surname most likely originates as a locational name from the villages of Dent in West Yorkshire and Cumberland—recorded circa 1200 as "Denet" and "Dinet"—from a British hill-name akin to Old Irish dinn/dind ("hill") and Old Norse tindr ("point, crag"). Alternatively, it may have arisen as a medieval nickname for someone notable for their teeth, from Old French *dent* (tooth).

== Geographic distribution ==
As of recent data, approximately 40,600 people worldwide bear the surname Dent, with the greatest numbers in the United States, followed by England and Australia. In the UK, around 11,300 individuals bear the name, ranking it the 929th most common surname. U.S. census data shows the number rose from about 14,082 in 2000 to 14,873 in 2010, though the per-capita incidence dipped slightly.

== Notable individuals ==
A non-exhaustive list of notable people with the surname includes:

- Aileen Dent (1890–1978), Australian artist
- Akeem Dent (born 1987), American football linebacker
- Alan Dent (1905–1978), Scottish journalist, editor and writer
- Albert W. Dent (1904–1984), American academic administrator
- Alfred Dent (1844–1927), British businessman and founder of the North Borneo Chartered Company
- Ancilla Dent (born 1933), English Roman Catholic nun, ecological activist, and writer
- Andrew Dent (1955–2008), Australian doctor and humanitarian worker
- Beryl May Dent (1900–1977), British mathematical physicist
- Betty-Ann Dent (born 1950), American professional tennis player
- Borden Dent (1938–2000), American geographer and cartographer
- Bucky Dent (born 1951), American baseball player
- Burnell Dent (born 1963), professional American football linebacker
- Catherine Dent (born 1965), American actress
- Charles Dent (disambiguation), multiple people with the name (includes "Charlie")
- Charles Enrique Dent (1911–1976), British biochemist
- Charlie Dent (born 2006), English meteorologist
- Charlie Dent (born 1960), Pennsylvanian politician
- Chris Dent (born 1991), English cricketer
- Clinton Thomas Dent (1850–1912), English alpinist, author and surgeon
- Denny Dent (1948–2004), American speed painter
- Digby Dent (disambiguation), several people
- Donovan Dent (born 2003), American basketball player
- Douglas Dent (1869–1959), Royal Navy officer
- Eddie Dent (1887–1974), pitcher in Major League Baseball
- Edith Vere Dent (1863–1948), British amateur botanist and wild flower enthusiast
- Edward John Dent (1790–1853), English watch maker
- Edward Joseph Dent (1876–1957), English musicologist and biographer of Handel
- Emma Dent (1823–1900), English antiquarian and collector
- Eric Dent (born 1961), American complexity theorist
- Francis Dent (1866–1955), British railway manager
- Frederick B. Dent (1922–2019), United States Secretary of Commerce
- Frederick Tracy Dent (1820–1892), American soldier
- George Dent (1756–1813), American planter and politician from Maryland
- Grace Dent (born 1973), English columnist, broadcaster and author
- Harry Dent (disambiguation), multiple people
- J. M. Dent (1849–1926), British publisher
- Jason Dent (born 1980), American mixed martial artist
- Jim Dent (1939–2025), American golfer
- Jim Dent (author) (born 1953), American author and sportswriter
- John Dent (disambiguation), multiple people
- Julia Boggs Dent (1826–1902), wife of Ulysses Grant, the President of the United States
- Lachlan Dent (born 2000), Australian basketball player
- Lester Dent (1904–1959), American writer best known for creating the character Doc Savage
- Maggie Dent (born 1955), Australian parenting author
- Marmaduke H. Dent (1849–1909), American judge
- Martin Dent (academic) (1925–2014), English academic
- Richard Dent (born 1960), American football player and coach
- S. Hubert Dent Jr. (1869–1938), American lawyer and politician
- Susie Dent (born 1964), English lexicographer
- Taylor Dent (born 1981), American tennis player
- Ted Dent (born 1969), Canadian ice hockey player and coach
- Teresa Dent (born 1959), British charity executive, CEO, Game & Wildlife Conservation Trust
- Thomas Dent (disambiguation), multiple people
- Vernon Dent (1895–1963), American actor
- William Barton Wade Dent (1806–1855), American politician

== Fictional characters ==
- Arthur Dent, principal character in The Hitchhiker's Guide to the Galaxy
- Random Frequent Flyer Dent, daughter of Arthur Dent
- Hanzee Dent, character in the TV show Fargo
- Harvey Dent (Two-Face), villain from Batman's rogue gallery
- Fooly Dent, principal character in How to Treat a Lady Knight Right

== See also ==
- Dent (disambiguation)
