= John Dent =

John Dent may refer to:

- A number of early settlers and planters related to Charles County, Maryland:
  - Captain John Dent (c. 1645–1712), English-born American settler, planter and magistrate, nephew of Thomas Dent Sr.
  - General John Dent (1733–1809), politician, magistrate, and general in the Revolutionary War, father of George Dent
  - Captain John H. Dent (1782–1823), officer in the United States Navy during the Quasi-War and the First Barbary War, grandson of General John Dent
- John Dent (1751–1811), English founder of Dents leather goods
- John Dent (died 1826) (c. 1760–1826), British Member of Parliament for Lancaster and Poole
- John Dent (merchant) (1821–1892), Hong Kong and Shanghai businessman
- John Dent (Liberal MP) (1826–1894), British Whig/Liberal MP for Knaresborough and Scarborough
- John Dent (biathlete) (born 1938), British Olympic biathlete
- John Charles Dent (1841–1888), Canadian historian
- Johnny Dent (1903–?), English former footballer
- John H. Dent (politician) (1908–1988), Democratic member of the U.S. House of Representatives from Pennsylvania
- John Dent, character in Across the Continent

== See also ==
- Dent (surname)
