= Thomas Dent =

Thomas Dent may refer to:

- Thomas Dynt or Dent (fl. 1414), English politician
- Thomas Dent Sr. (1630–1676), Maryland politician
- Thomas Dent (lawyer) (1831–1924), Chicago lawyer
- Thomas Dent (Ontario politician) (1891–1977), politician in Ontario, Canada
- Thomas Dent (writer) (1932–1998), African-American poet and writer
- Tom Dent (born 1950), American politician
- Tom Dent (cricketer) (Thomas Henry Dent, 1879–1929), Australian cricketer and banker
- Thomas de Dent (died 1361), English born cleric and judge who held high office in Ireland

== See also ==
- Dent (surname)
