= Thomas Brooke Sr. =

English-born landowner and politician (1632–1676)

Major Thomas Brooke Sr.

Member of the Maryland Provisional Assembly
- In office September 15, 1663 – December 29, 1676

High Sheriff of Calvert County
- In office 1666 – May 1667

Chief Justice of Calvert County Court
- In office May 1667 – December 29, 1676

Personal details
- Born: Thomas Brooke; June 23, 1632 Battle, East Sussex, England
- Died: December 29, 1676 (aged 44) Prince Frederick, Maryland, English America
- Spouse: Eleanor Hatton (m. 1658)
- Children: 7, including Thomas Jr.
- Parent: Robert Brooke Sr. (father)
- Profession: Lawyer; planter; militia officer; politician
- Military career
- Branch: Maryland Colonial Militia
- Service years: 1658–1676
- Rank: Major

Major Thomas Brooke Sr., Esq. (June 23, 1632 – December 29, 1676) was an English-born colonial magistrate, planter, militia officer, and politician who served as Member of the Maryland Provisional Assembly from 1663 to 1676. He also concurrently served as High Sheriff of Calvert County from 1666 to 1667 and as Chief Justice from 1667 to 1676.

== Early life and education ==
Thomas Brooke was born in Battle, Sussex, England on June 23, 1632, the son of Gov. Robert Brooke Sr., Esq. (1602–1655) and his first wife, Mary Baker (1602–1634).

Thomas was raised as a Protestant but converted to Roman Catholicism. He immigrated at the age of 18 to Maryland with his father Gov. Robert Brooke Sr., Esq., an Anglican minister (1602–1655) on June 30, 1650.

== Career ==
Thomas Brooke was commissioned a Captain in 1658, commanding the Militia of Calvert County, and then a Major in the Militia of Calvert County by 1660, at age 28. In 1661 he led an expedition against Native Americans. He served as a Burgess for Calvert County from 1663–1669, and again from 1671-1676. He was a High Sheriff of Calvert County from 1660–1667, and presiding Chief Justice of the County Court in 1667. In addition Thomas was Mayor of Battle Creek, Calvert Co., Maryland.

Maj. Thomas Brooke resided at his plantation called "Brookefield", which he laid out on April 16, 1664. "Brookefield" was located in the woods on the west side of the Patuxent River, bounded on the north by Brooke or Mattaponi Creek, on the east by the Patuxent River, on the south by Deep or Spicer's Creek and extending west to a line marked by a stone on which were cut the letters T. B., the initials of the grantee. This is the origin of the name of the current town of T. B. A few years later Major Brooke conveyed back to the Lord Proprietor a certain number of acres on the bank of the Patuxent, intended for the site of a town, which, when laid out, was called "Nottingham Towne", in honor of the Duke of Nottingham. The village still bears the name.

Besides Brookefield, Maj. Brooke was owner of two tracts of land in Charles County. The first was "Locust Thicket", which he laid down on May 2, 1668. The second one was laid down the next day, called "Brookes Landing". He also owned five other tracts of land in Calvert County, named: "Brookes Content", laid down April 2, 1668; "Brookes Grove", on May 2, 1668; "Little Grove", on March 23, 1669; "Poplar Neck", on June 10, 1671; and "Cross-Cloath", on February 2, 1673. At the time of his death on December 29, 1676, Brooke had accumulated 7,742 acres (31.33 km^{2}). His estate, which included 10 slaves and 10 servants (indentured) was valued at 95,910 pounds of tobacco. Thomas and Eleanor Brooke were both members of the Roman Catholic Church and raised their children as Catholic.

== Marriage ==
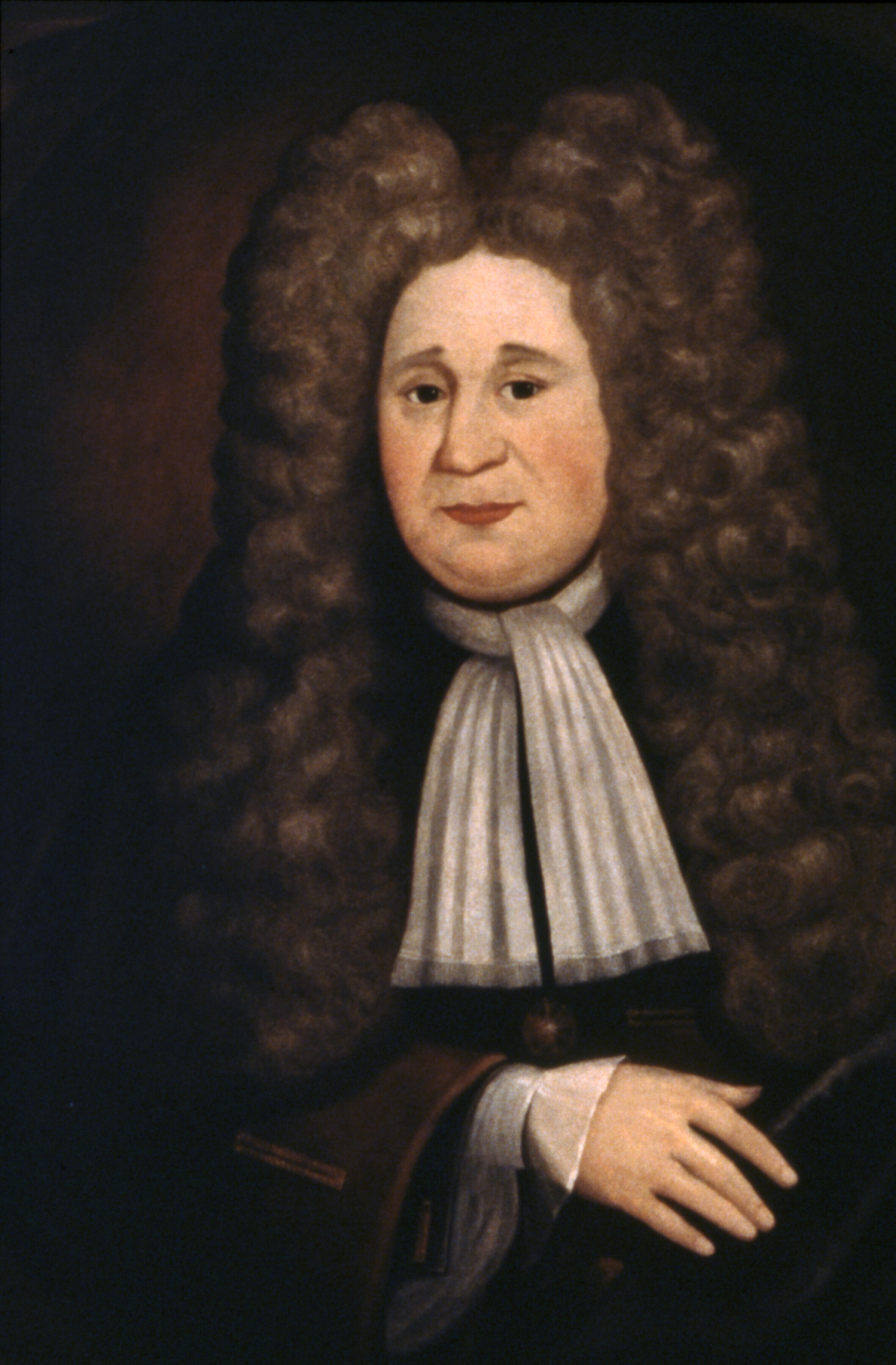
Henry Darnall (1645-1711) of "Woodyard"

In 1658 Brooke married as his second wife Eleanor Hatton (1642–1725), who was 16 years old. She was born in London, England on April 3, 1642, the daughter of Richard Hatton Sr., (1605-1648), and Margaret (ca. 1610), who married later secondly, Captain Richard Banks Sr., (ca. 1612-1667), of Maryland. Eleanor emigrated across the Atlantic to Maryland in 1649 with her widowed mother and family. Eleanor's uncle Thomas Hatton (d. 1654), had been Secretary of the Province.

After the death of Thomas Brooke (1632–1676), the widowed Eleanor, then still only age 34, married Col. Henry Darnall (1645–1711) of "Woodyard" and "Darnall's Delight". Her son from her first marriage, Thomas Brooke Jr., (1660–1730), became the stepson of Colonel Darnall and the adopted half-brother of Henry Darnall II, Esq. (d. 1737). Eleanor Hatton Brooke Darnall died on February 21, 1725, at "Portland Manor" in Anne Arundel County.

== Children ==
- Gov. Thomas Brooke Jr. (1659-1730/31) of "Brookefield", Thomas married 1) Ann ? 2) Barbara Dent (1676–1754), daughter of Col. Thomas Dent Sr., Gent.
- Robert Brooke (1663–1714), a Jesuit priest, first priest born in the British colonies.
- Mary Brooke (bef. 1669-1742, who married 1) Capt. James Bowling (ca. 1636-1693). 2) Capt. Benjamin Hall (1667–1721). 3) Henry Witham.
- Ignatius Brooke (1670–1751)
- Matthew Brooke (1672–1703)
- Elinor Brooke (1673–1740), who married 1) Philip Darnall (1671–1705); 2) William Digges Jr.
- Clement Brooke Sr. (1676–1737), who married Jane Sewall (1685–1761).
