= Governor Hart =

Governor Hart may refer to:

- John Hart (Governor of Maryland) (fl. 1710s–1720s), 12th Royal Governor of Maryland from 1714 to 1715
- Louis F. Hart (1862–1929), 9th Governor of Washington
- Ossian B. Hart (1821–1874), 10th Governor of Florida
