= Mowrey =

Mowrey is a surname. Notable people with the surname include:

- Dent Mowrey (1888–1960), American composer, musician, and music teacher
- Dude Mowrey (born 1972), American country music artist
- Mike Mowrey (1884–1947), American baseball player
