= Dent Township =

Dent Township may refer to:

- Dent Township, Lawrence County, Arkansas, in Lawrence County, Arkansas
- Dent Township, Woodruff County, Arkansas, in Woodruff County, Arkansas
- Dent Township, Iron County, Missouri
