= Digby Dent =

Digby Dent may refer to:

- Digby Dent (Royal Navy officer, born 1682) (1682–1737), Royal Navy officer who served as Commander-in-Chief of the Jamaica Station
- Digby Dent (Royal Navy officer, born 1710) (1710–1761), Royal Navy officer—son of above—who served as Commander-in-Chief of the Jamaica Station
- Digby Dent (Royal Navy officer, born 1739) (1739–1817), Royal Navy rear admiral

== See also ==
- Dent (surname)
