= Thomas Brooke Jr. =

American judge, planter and politician (1659/1660–1731)

Colonel Thomas Brooke Jr.

Acting Colonial Governor of Maryland
- In office May – October 1720
- Preceded by: John Hart
- Succeeded by: Charles Calvert

Personal details
- Born: c. 1659 or 1660 Near Nottingham, Calvert County, Maryland, English America
- Died: January 7, 1731 (aged 71–72) Nottingham, Prince George's County, Maryland, British America
- Spouses: Anne Addison (m. 1679; died 1692) Barbara Dent (m. 1699)
- Children: 14
- Parent: Thomas Brooke Sr. (father)
- Relatives: Robert Brooke Sr. (paternal grandfather); Thomas Dent Sr. (father-in-law)
- Profession: Judge; planter; politician
- Military career
- Allegiance: Maryland Colonial Militia
- Service years: 1684–1708; 1715–1722
- Rank: Colonel

Colonel Thomas Brooke Jr. (c. 1659 or 1660 – January 7, 1731) was a Maryland judge, planter, and politician who served as acting colonial governor of Maryland for five months in 1720. He was the son of Major Thomas Brooke Sr. and the paternal grandson of Robert Brooke Sr., who also served as acting colonial governor.

In 1720, he was elected President of the Governor's Council, (upper house of the colonial Maryland General Assembly) and acting (12th), Governor of Maryland from the departure of 11th Gov. John Hart until the arrival of Charles Calvert, fifth Lord Baltimore. Brooke Jr. was replaced as the 14th governor by Captain Charles Calvert, cousin of the Lord Baltimore, and a Calvert family loyalist.

== Biography ==
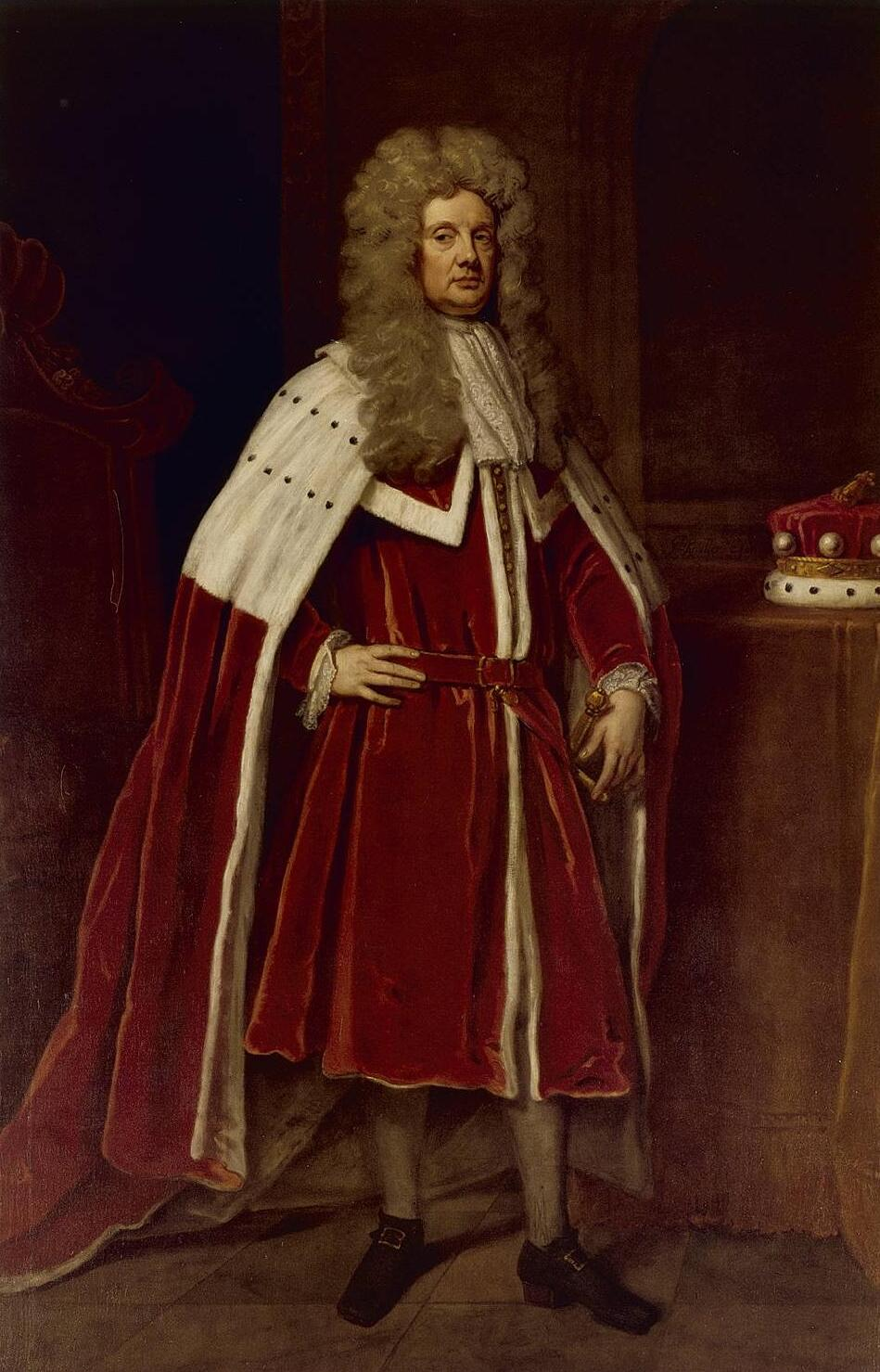
Charles Calvert, 3rd Lord Baltimore

Thomas was born in 1660 near Nottingham in Calvert County (after 1696 Prince George's County), Maryland to Major Thomas Brooke and Eleanor Hutton. He was commissioned Major of the Militia and promoted to Colonel.

Thomas was one of the justices for Calvert County. Thomas was a justice of the peace for Calvert County from 1679 to 1681 and 1685 to 1689. Thomas was a vestryman of St. Paul's Parish, Calvert County. He was removed from his justiceship probably due to his opposition to the revolution Protestant Associators in 1689. He was nominated by Charles Calvert, 3rd Lord Baltimore to become a member of the first royal Council, commonly known as the Upper House, on August 26, 1691. He was probably appointed in an effort to mollify the proprietor after his loss of the colony. Thomas served as a member of the Council of Maryland from 1692 to 1707. He took the oath of office as a justice of the Provincial Court on May 1, 1694. He was appointed Deputy Secretary of Maryland the following year, and in 1699 was Commissary General of the Province.

Thomas was dismissed from all offices by the Governor of Maryland, John Seymour, in 1708 as a result of close Roman Catholic ties—his brothers were Jesuits and Col. Henry Darnall was his stepfather—and for poor Council attendance, although his attendance had been very regular prior to Seymour's governorship. Brooke was reappointed to the same position after the colony reverted to proprietary control, and served from 1715 to 1722.

=== Governor of Maryland ===
In 1720 he was elected President of the Council, and acting Governor of Maryland from the departure of Gov. John Hart until the arrival of Charles Calvert, 5th Baron Baltimore. He was replaced as governor by Captain Charles Calvert, cousin of Lord Baltimore, and a Calvert family loyalist.

The reason for his second dismissal from the Council in 1722, is unclear. Unlike his parents and brothers, he was a member of the Church of England and reared his family in that faith. He was one of the first vestryman of St. Paul's Parish.

Thomas resided at "Brookefield", his estate on Mattaponi Creek near the Patuxent River, which he inherited from his father. The land was formerly in Calvert County, but in 1696 became Prince George's County when it was formed. In addition to "Brookefield", Col. Brooke also laid out several other tracts of land in Calvert County including: "The Gore", laid out on June 10, 1680; "Brookes Chance", on July 13, 1680; "Addition to Brooke Chance", on June 10, 1685; "Hogg Pen", on June 12, 1685; "Addition to Brookefield", on March 29, 1688; "The Grove Landing", on July 10, 1688; "The Forrest", on Sep. 5, 1694; "Dan" on September 6, 1694; "Brookes Discovery", on Dec. 10, 1695; and "The Prospect", on Dec. 11, 1695. At the time of his death on January 7, 1731, at "Brookefield", Thomas had amassed over 7,000 acres (28 km^{2}) of land, in which a majority was heavily mortgaged. His estate value was listed at 1,374 pounds, including proceeds of the sale of land, and 36 slaves.

== Personal life ==
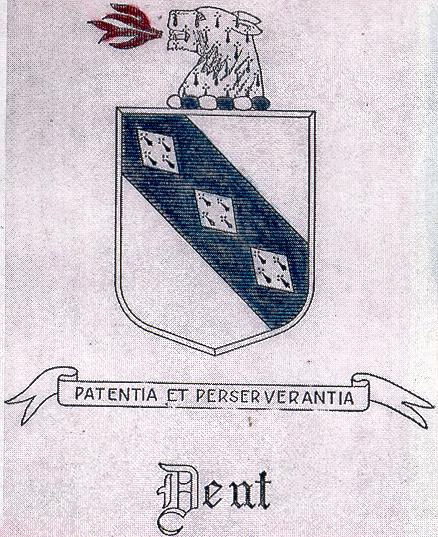
Dent family coat of arms

In 1679, Brooke married Anne Addison, with whom he would have four children. Following his first wife's death in 1692, Brooke married Barbara Dent—the daughter of Col. Thomas Dent Sr. and Rebecca Wilkinson—by 1699. Brooke had an additional ten children with her between 1699 and 1717 prior to his death in 1731. He was survived by three of the four children from his first marriage, seven of the ten children from his second, and his second wife, who later died in Calvert County on April 18, 1754.

== See also ==
- List of colonial governors of Maryland
