= Quatre frères =

Vessel that served under four nations

History

France
- Name: Quatre frères
- Owner: Jouguet
- Builder: America or Bermuda
- Commissioned: 1796
- Captured: March 1797

Great Britain
- Acquired: April 1797 by capture
- Renamed: HMS Transfer
- Fate: Sold 1802

Ottoman Tripolitania
- Acquired: 1802 by purchase at Malta
- Captured: 18 or 21 March 1804

United States
- Name: USS Scourge
- Namesake: Scourge
- Cost: Spanish $5,000 purchased
- Acquired: 21 March 1804 by capture
- Commissioned: 17 April 1804
- Out of service: 1812
- Fate: Sold 1812

General characteristics
- Tons burthen: 150 (French; "of load"); 18113/94 (bm)
- Length: 80 ft 0 in (24.4 m) (overall); 63 ft 0 in (19.2 m) (keel)
- Beam: 23 ft 3 in (7.1 m)
- Depth of hold: 14 ft 6 in (4.4 m)
- Sail plan: Quatre frères:polacca; Transfer:Brig
- Complement: Quatre frères:38; Transfer:70; Tripoli:80; Scourge:36-67
- Armament: Quatre frères:6 guns + 10 swivel guns + 1 × 6-barrel volley gun. 17 April 1804 16 X 6 pounders; Transfer:12 × 6-pounder guns; Tripoli:10 guns; Scourge: 17 April 1804 16 × 6-pounder guns

Quatre frères was either an American or Bermudian-built vessel. She was commissioned in 1796 at Bordeaux as a French privateer. The Royal Navy captured her in April 1797 and took her into service as HMS Transfer. The Royal Navy sold her at Malta in 1802 to Ottoman Tripolitania. The U.S. Navy captured her in 1804 and took her into service as USS Scourge. The U.S. Navy sold her in 1812.

== Quatre frères ==
Quatre frères was commissioned in 1796 in Bordeaux under Martial Dupeyrat. Under his command she captured two prizes: Résolution and Frascara, that she sent into Rochfort. Résolution, of Lisbon and of 500 tons (French, "of load"), Dos Santos (or Roze de Sautort), master, was a Portuguese vessel carrying wheat and almonds from the Barbary Coast. Frascara was a Danish vessel carrying oranges and lemons.

The 74-gun HMS Irresistible captured Quatre frères in March 1797 in the Mediterranean.

== HMS Transfer ==
The Royal Navy registered Transfer on 30 June 1797, and commissioned her in October under Commander George Bowen. Transfer, brig of 14 guns, is listed as being in Earl St Vincent's fleet in 1798. Commander George Mundy (or Munday), was promoted to command of Transfer on 24 December 1798. She was listed in Lord Viscount Keith's fleet in 1799.

On 11 February 1799, Transfer, under the command of Lieutenant George Miller (acting), captured the French privateer Escamoteur off Ayamonte. Escamoteur was armed with three 6-pounder guns and had a crew of 34 men.

On 4 April Transfer was under Mundy's command when she and the 74-gun Majestic destroyed a French privateer of 14 guns and of unknown name. The two British ships were patrolling between Malaga and Cape de Gatt when they encountered the privateer, which they chased into a small bay where their quarry took refuge under the three guns of a circular fortress. Head money was paid in 1828, almost 30 years later. (Note: A first-class share of the head money was worth £94 2s 9 3/4d; a fifth-class share, that of seaman, was worth 4s 11 2/3d.)

Transfer was present at the surrender of the French garrison at Civitavecchia on 21 September. She shared the prize money for the capture of the town and fortress with Culloden, Mutine, Minotaur, and the bomb vessel Perseus. The British also captured the French polacca Il Reconniscento.

In October 1800 Commander Edward O'Brien took command of Transfer. She shared with Lutine, Strombolo and Bonne Citoyenne in the proceeds of unclaimed property found on the ship Fowler on 31 October 1800. In 1801 O'Brien received promotion to post captain and command of Kent.

Next, under the command of Lieutenant John Nicholas, she served in Admiral Viscount Keith's Egyptian campaign of 1801. Prize money was paid in April 1823. (Note: A first-class share was worth £34 2s 4d; a fifth-class share was worth 3s 11 1/2d.) In 1850 the Admiralty awarded the Medal for Egypt to the crews of any vessel that had served in the campaign between 8 March and 2 September 1801. Transfer is listed among the vessels whose crews qualified.

Commander Richard Cribb took command in April 1802, but the Navy paid-off Transfer in June 1802. It then sold her at Malta that same year for £700.

== Tripolitanian Navy ==
Gaetano Andrea Schembri, consul for Ottoman Tripolitania, purchased Transfer at Malta. Tripoli then used her in blockade running during the Barbary Wars. Syren, commanded by Lieutenant Charles Stewart, captured her off Tripoli on 18 or 21 March 1804. The Americans captured her for violating the conditions for the pass under which she had permission to pass through the blockade of the port of Tripoli.

== USS Scourge ==
Commodore Edward Preble renamed the ship Scourge. On 17 April 1804, Lt. John H. Dent was ordered to take command. and was Commissioned that day. She departed Syracuse, Sicily 5 May and arrived off Tripoli 10 May, and also in the attacks on Tripoli (other source says she didn't participate in the attacks). She was commanded by Lieutenants John H. Dent, Jonathan Thorn, John Rowe, Henry Wadsworth (acting lieutenant), and Ralph Izard in succession. (Other source list under command of Rowe, and under command of Izard when she departed Tripoli). In a letter 15 June, 1804 Squadron Commodore (Captain) Edward Preble declared her to be a "dull Sailer" (i.e.slow). In a logbook by USS Constitution's Sailing Master Nathaniel Haraden it's stated on 1 September 1804, that "Scourge" is no longer considered a warship and most of her crew transferred, but with Captain Dent still in command with three other officers and few crewmen. In a letter dated 6 September Lt. Jonathan Thorn is given command. Midshipman Izard was ordered to take command in a letter dated 7 October (possibly 27 October). On 30 November 1804, Izard sailed Scourge for the United States with passenger Midshipman F. Cornelius De Kraft under arrest for murder in a duel. She arrived off Cape Henry on 12 February 1805, and at Norfolk, Virginia on 13 February. She was dismantled (placed in ordinary?) with her boatswain in charge and with 3-4 seamen.

Once in the U.S., Scourge saw coastal service. In 1812, the United States Navy declared Scourge unfit for further service and sold her at auction in Norfolk, Virginia.
