= Robert Brooke Sr. =

Colonial Governor of Maryland

Acting Colonial Governor of Maryland
- In office March 29, 1652 – July 3, 1652
- Preceded by: William Stone
- Succeeded by: William Stone

Personal details
- Born: Robert Brooke; June 23, 1602 London, England
- Died: July 20, 1655 (aged 53) Calvert County, Maryland, British America
- Spouses: Mary Baker (m. 1627; died 1634) Mary Mainwaring (m. 1635)
- Children: 17, including Thomas
- Profession: Clergyman; planter; landowner; colonial official

Robert Brooke Sr. (June 23, 1602 – July 20, 1655) was an English-born Anglican clergyman, planter, landowner, and colonial official who served as acting colonial governor of Maryland for several months in 1652. The patriarch of a prominent Maryland dynasty, he was the father of Major Thomas Brooke Sr., a Maryland magistrate, and the paternal grandfather of Thomas Brooke Jr., who also served as acting colonial governor of Maryland.

== Early life ==
Coat of Arms of Robert Brooke, Sr.

Robert Brooke was born in London on June 23, 1602, third son of Thomas Brooke (1561–1612) of Whitchurch and Susan Foster, daughter of Sir Thomas Forster (1548–1612) of "Etherstone" and sister of Sir Robert Foster, Lord Chief Justice of the King's Bench. Thomas Brooke was a barrister at Inner Temple and MP for Whitchurch from 1604 to 1611. The Brooke family arms were recorded in the Visitation of Hampshire, 1634. Robert and his ten siblings were orphaned in 1612 and were given into the care of their uncle Richard Venables, who managed the Brooke children's finances and saw to their education. Robert matriculated at Wadham College, Oxford on April 28, 1618. He received the degree of B.A. July 6, 1620; consequently, in 1624, without further study or examination, he also received a Master of Arts degree.

== Religious career ==
He was admitted to Orders though the earliest evidence of his posting to a parish occurs after the death of his first wife, Mary Baker, and subsequent marriage to Mary Mainwaring in 1635. He was made vicar of Laugharne with Llansadwrnen in the Diocese of St Davids on November 21, 1637 under the direct patronage of Charles I, who in concert with William Laud sought to promote clergymen supporting the philosophy of Divine Right.

By this point, Brooke's uncle Sir Robert Foster was an outspoken supporter of Charles I's controversial policies such as ships-money. If Brooke wrote in support of the king in matters of theology, it does not appear his writings have survived, but his posting in Wales is likely due to the influence of his father-in-law Roger Mainwaring, an outspoken proponent for concepts of Divine Right, who was made Bishop of St Davids the year prior in 1636, an appointment Laud had held himself along his path to Archbishop of Canterbury.

Political tensions between King Charles I and Parliament flared in the 1640s. Mainwaring would flee Wales to Ireland from 1641 to 1642 when the Long Parliament issued a warrant for his arrest. Brooke's appointment to command of a county in Maryland in 1649 neatly coincides with the execution of his royal patron, the removal of Roger Mainwaring as Bishop of St Davids, and the exodus of Cavaliers to Maryland and Virginia. Robert Brooke would not serve in the Anglican Church after his arrival in Maryland, and in fact he and his family would convert to Catholicism prior to his death in 1655.

== First family ==
Brooke married first, on February 25, 1627, Mary Baker (1602–34), daughter of Thomas Baker of Battle in Sussex, England. Robert and Mary (Baker) Brooke had four children:

1. Baker, married Anne Calvert, daughter of Gov. Leonard Calvert, first Governor of Maryland
2. Mary
3. Thomas, married Eleanor Hatton, daughter of Richard Hatton and wife Margaret Domville
4. Barbara

== Second family ==
Brooke married second, on May 11, 1635, Mary Mainwaring, daughter of Roger Mainwaring (1582–1653), Dean of Worcester and Bishop of St Davids, and his wife Cecilia Proper. Robert and Mary (Mainwaring) Brooke had thirteen children:

1. Charles (1636-1671) Never married; first Southerner to graduate from Harvard College, Class of 1655
2. Roger, married:
  1. Dorothy Neale, daughter of Capt. James Neale and Anna Maria Gill
  2. Mary Wolseley, daughter of Walter Wolseley and Mary Beauchamp.
3. Robert, married Elizabeth Thompson, daughter of William Thompson and Mary Bretton.
4. John, married Rebecca Isaacs.
5. Mary.
6. William.
7. Ann, married Christopher Beanes.
8. Francis, never married.
9. Basil, died in infancy.
10. Henry, never married.
11. Elizabeth, married Capt. Richard Smith Jr.

== Emigrants to Maryland ==
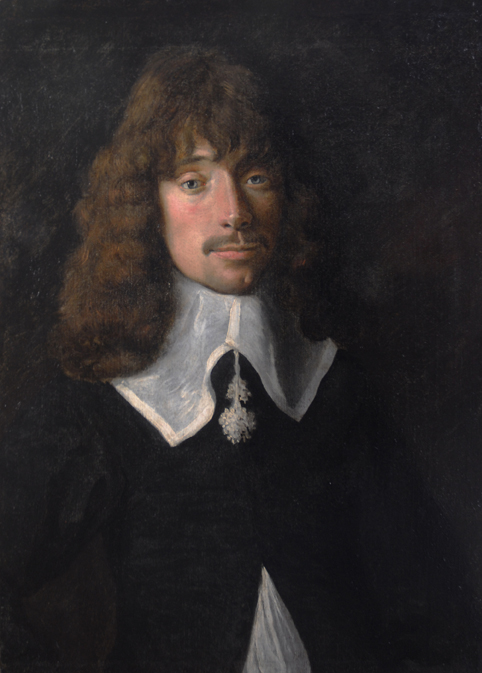
Leonard Calvert (Florence MacKubin, 1914)

On September 20, 1649, Brooke was issued with a commission as Commander of "one whole county" (in the province of Maryland) "to be newly set forth, erected, &c" by Governor Stone at the request of Cecil Calvert. He was to receive a grant of 2,000 acres (8.1 km^{2}) for every ten persons he transported. Brooke is said to have departed from Chester (June 1650) aboard his own ships and at his own expense, along with his wife, ten children, 28 servants, and a pack of hounds. On July 22, 1650, along with his two sons, Baker and Thomas Sr., he took the oath of Fidelity to the Proprietor. His sons each received separate grants of land in various counties of Maryland. Robert Brooke was constituted as Commander of newly formed Old Charles County in Maryland on October 30, 1650 (Old Charles County consisted largely of lands within today’s borders of Charles County but "included parts of St. Mary’s, Calvert, present-day Charles and Prince George’s County"; the borders were redrawn shortly thereafter). This appointment was an expression of the friendship between Brooke and Cecil Calvert that they had formed at Oxford as residents of neighboring colleges.

== Political activities ==
In 1652, under the Cromwellian Government, Brooke was made Governor, and served in this capacity from March 29 to July 3, 1652. His co-operation with the Bennett-Claiborne Puritan faction brought him the displeasure of Lord Baltimore and the loss of his proprietary offices. Later he reconciled with Lord Baltimore, allied himself with the conservative Catholic Party, and he and his family converted to Catholicism prior to his death.

== Property ==
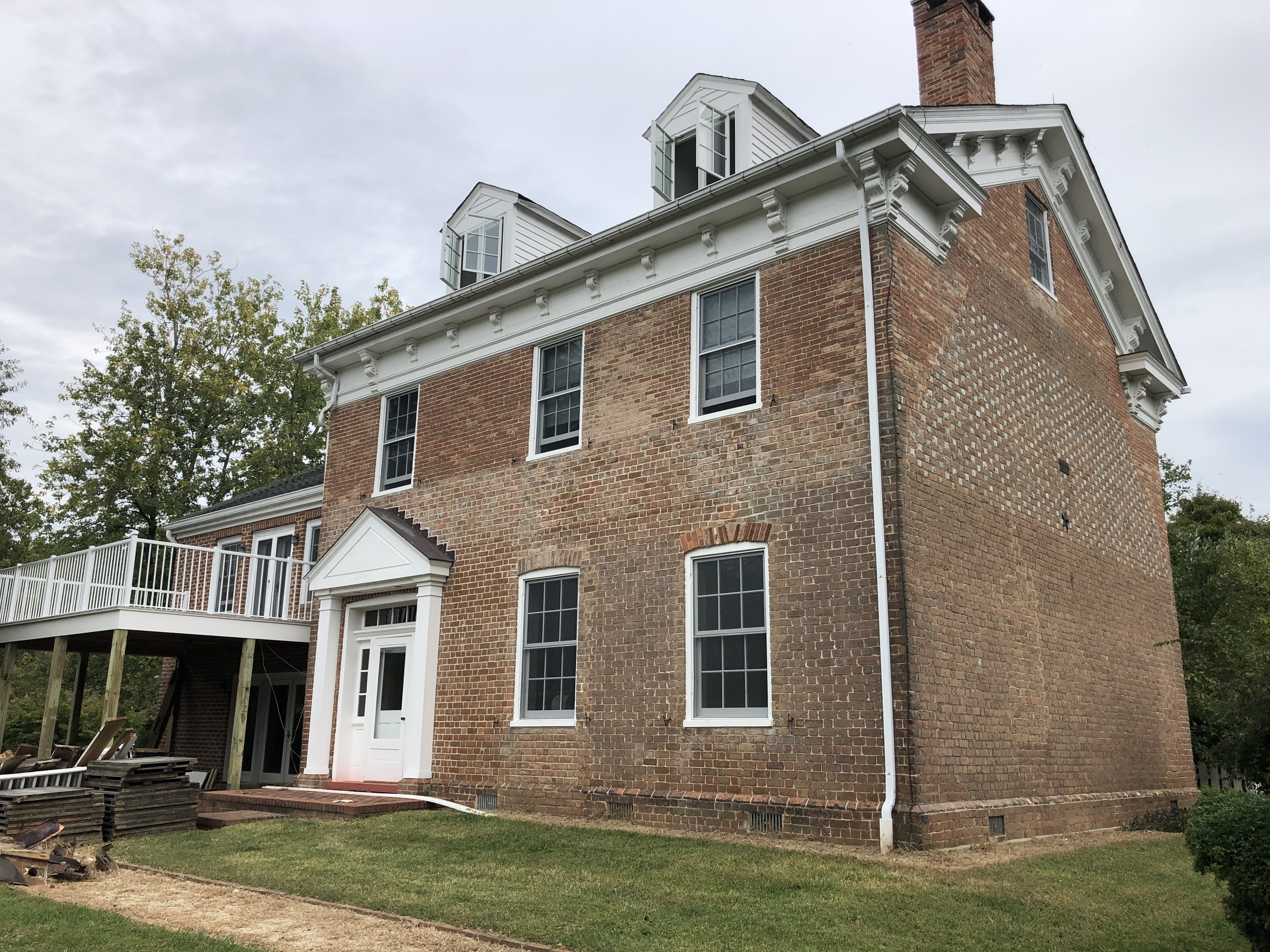
Brooke Place Manor

Like most of the wealthy emigrants who came to Maryland under the patronage of the Proprietor, Brooke amassed many thousands of acres of land. He constructed three large estates, each named for himself:

- "De La Brooke Manor" (2,000 acres (8.1 km^{2}), granted July 28, 1650) in St. Mary's County, Maryland; a private residence and still the home location of a hunt club.
- "Brooke Place Manor" (2,100 acres (8.5 km^{2})) on Battle Creek, Calvert County, across the Patuxent, where he built a home almost a replica of "De La Brooke".
- "Brooke Court" (2,000 acres (8.1 km^{2})) in what is now Prince George's County.

By the time of his death on July 20, 1655, Brooke is said to have accumulated 8,000 acres (32 km^{2}) of land.

== Legacy ==
Robert Brooke is regarded as an originator of the sport of foxhunting in British America and regarded as America's first Master of Foxhounds (MFH), and the pack of hounds that he brought with him on his ship are one of the three ancestral strains of the American Foxhound, together with the Marquis de Lafayette's hounds and George Washington's. Robert Brooke's pack of hounds descended through his family, which still kept and bred the pack at least as late as the 1940, a singular feat in the sport of foxhunting as well as dog breeding as it represents 290 years of breeding by one family. American Foxhounds from this lineage were additionally known as "Brooke Hounds."

== See also ==
- Colonial families of Maryland
