= Charles Dent =

Charles Dent may refer to:

- Charlie Dent (born 1960), American politician
- John Charles Dent (1841–1888), Canadian author and journalist
- Charles Dent (politician) (born 1951), Northwest Territories politician
- Charles Enrique Dent (1911–1976), physician and biochemist
