= George Dent =

American planter and politician (1756–1813)

George Dent (1756 – December 2, 1813) was an American planter and politician from Maryland who served in the House of Representatives from 1793 to 1801.

== Early life ==
Dent was born on his father's estate, "Windsor Castle", on the Mattawoman Creek in Charles County. His father, General John Dent (1733-1809), was a planter who was a patriot during the Revolutionary War.

== Revolutionary War ==
He initially served during the Revolutionary War in 1776 as a 1st lieutenant in the Third Battalion of the Flying Camp from Maryland. After the Flying Camp was disbanded in December 1776, Dent returned to Maryland and was commissioned a 1st lieutenant in the Charles County militia under Captain Thomas H. Marshall. He was subsequently promoted to captain and assigned to the Twenty-sixth Battalion in May 1778.

== Political career ==
After the war, Dent served as a member of the Maryland House of Delegates from 1782 to 1790, where he was speaker pro tempore in 1788 and speaker in 1789 and 1790. During his tenure as a delegate, he was an unsuccessful candidate for Maryland's 1st congressional district in 1789. He served as the justice of the Charles County Court in 1791 and 1792, and as member of the Maryland Senate in 1791 and 1792, where he was President of the Senate during the latter year until his resignation on December 21, 1792.

In 1792, Dent was elected as a Pro-Administration candidate to the Third Congress and reelected as a Federalist to the Fourth through Sixth Congresses, serving from March 4, 1793, to March 3, 1801. In Congress, Dent served as chairman of the Committee on Elections (Sixth Congress). He also served as Speaker pro tempore of the House at various times from 1797 to 1799.

Upon leaving Congress, Dent was appointed by President Thomas Jefferson as United States marshal of the District Court for the Potomac District at Washington, D.C., on April 4, 1801.

== Family and later life ==
His father had been a general during the Revolutionary War. His grandfather, George Dent, had been Chief Justice of Maryland. Judge Thomas Dent, Sr. was his grandfather's grandfather. The Dent family had been part of Maryland society from the very beginning of the colony. His son, Captain John H. Dent, was a naval hero of the Barbary Wars. George Dent left his family and public service behind when he moved to Georgia in 1802 and settled about twelve miles from Augusta. He died in 1813 in a horseback riding accident and is interred on his plantation.

Political offices
Preceded by Thomas Cockey Deye	Speaker of the Maryland House of Delegates; 1789–1790	Succeeded by Levin Winder
Preceded by William Smallwood	President of the Maryland State Senate; 1792	Succeeded by William Perry
U.S. House of Representatives
Preceded by Philip Key	Member of the U.S. House of Representatives from Maryland's 1st congressional district 1793–1801	Succeeded by John Campbell
