= Borden Dent =

American geographer and cartographer

Borden D. Dent (1938–2000) was an American geographer and cartographer who served as professor emeritus and chairman of the Department of Geography and Anthropology at Georgia State University. His textbook, Cartography: Thematic Map Design, has been one of the seminal texts in the field.

== Biography ==
Born in Arkansas, Dent attended elementary and high school in Maryland. He completed a B.A. in Geography at Towson State University before pursuing an M.A. in Geography from the University of California at Berkeley. Dent then went on to earn his PhD in Geography from Clark University in Worcester, Massachusetts.

After completing his education, Dent taught geography and cartography classes at Georgia State University for thirty years. During his career, Dent published articles on cartography and geography in leading professional journals, including the Annals of the Association of American Geographers, the American Cartographer, the Cartographic Journal and the Journal of Geography.

The American Congress on Surveying and Mapping asked Dent in 1981 to contribute the first map commentary ever featured in The American Cartographer. Dent's academic publications have been cited 121 times as of April 2009.

== Background ==
Dent's specialization as a geographer and cartographer was thematic mapping. He defined thematic maps as those that show “the spatial distribution of some geographical phenomenon,” in contrast with general-purpose or reference maps that “display objects (both natural and man-made) from the geographical environment.” He further explained that because thematic maps deal with a single theme, a “reference map is to a thematic map what a dictionary is to an essay.”

In his book entitled Early Thematic Mapping in the History of Cartography, Arthur H. Robinson, stated that “no map which is primarily thematic appears to have been made before the last half of the seventeenth century.” He went on to detail a variety of factors that led to the development of thematic maps, including the development of accurate base maps, improvements in printing technology, and the rise of statistics as a field of study. These and many other cultural and intellectual factors contributed to the creation of an environment in late 17th century Western Europe that spawned the thematic map, now recognized as a revolutionary development in the history of cartography.

Although thematic mapping first arose in the late 17th century, Dent felt that “the significant, formative years in the development of portrayal techniques in thematic cartography were the first six decades of the nineteenth century.” During this period, the great majority of techniques used to depict thematic data were developed. These included “proportional point symbols, the line of equal value (isoline), the choropleth and shading, the dot method, class intervals, and flow lines.” As the main cartographic tools for depicting thematic data had already been developed, much of Dent's career was spent researching and examining ways in which the cartographer could better communicate with the map reader.

== Doctoral thesis ==
Dent's doctoral thesis, Perceptual Organization and Thematic Map Communication: Some Principles for Effective Map Design with Special Emphasis on the Figure-Ground Relationship, was published in 1970. In it, Dent quotes Robinson, writing “…the only beauty absolutely essential in a map is that which comes from its functional effectiveness for its intended purpose and not that which comes from a pleasing or artistic appearance.”

In the thesis, Dent argued that the map was a vehicle for graphically relaying ideas from the cartographer to the map reader. If a map that does not convey the ideas the cartographer intended it to express, it is a failure. Dent said that “the key to effective map communication [lay] in cartographic design.” He spent most of his thesis examining ways in which cartographers could harness the natural perceptual tendencies of humans in order to more effectively communicate their ideas.

== Published work ==
=== 1972 article ===
In March 1972, Dent published an article in the Annals of the Association of American Geographers entitled Visual Organization and Thematic Map Communication. In the article, he referenced studies that documented the misinterpretation of the information on thematic maps by map readers.

Dent believed that cartographers should use the principles of the figure-ground relationship to better organize the visual field. He explained that “the visual field has two areas; the area that stands out is the figure, and the remainder is the ground” and “to improve communication, the important intellectual elements in the map should appear as figures.” The remainder of the article was dedicated to discussing the visual enhancement of the figure in relation to the ground by increasing heterogeneity between the two elements. Dent suggested using strong, well-defined edges for the figure, articulating the figure, and depicting the figure as a closed shape. He concluded the article by observing that the figures on the map carry the important intellectual content, but that an effective map cannot be created without visually integrating the geographic data of the ground into the whole.

=== Principles of Thematic Map Design ===
In 1985, Dent published the first edition of the college textbook Principles of Thematic Map Design. The title was changed in later editions to Cartography: Thematic Map Design.

Dent wrote in the introduction to the text that “ideas are conveyed in a straightforward manner that stresses the integration of modern cartographic theory and practice.” Dent discusses the prevailing cartographic theory of the time, the map communication model,. Dent included information on good map design principles as well as more technical information about map projections and geodesy. Part of the value of the text is that Dent approached thematic cartography from a number of different directions. He offered the reader both theoretical and technical insight into the practice, but also encouraged them to apply their creativity to the process. Dent lists activities shared by people he considered to be great thinkers, scientists, or artists:

1. Challenging assumptions- daring to question what most people take as truth.
2. Recognizing patterns- perceiving significant similarities or differences in ideas, events, or physical phenomena.
3. Seeing in new ways- looking at the commonplace with new perceptions, transforming the familiar into the strange, and the strange into the familiar.
4. Making connections- bringing together seemingly unrelated ideas, objects, or events in ways that lead to new concepts.
5. Taking risks- daring to try new ways, with no control over the outcome.
6. Using chance- taking advantage of the unexpected.
7. Constructing networks- forming associations for the exchange of ideas, perceptions, questions, and encouragement.

=== Cartography: Thematic Map Design ===
Dent published the second edition of his renamed textbook, Cartography: Thematic Map Design, in 1990. He added a section on geographic cartography, which he explained is “distinct from other branches of cartography in that it alone is the tool and product of the geographer.” Dent also included a focus on choropleth mapping in quantitative cartography and “a growing interest among professional cartographers in the history of thematic mapping.”

Dent published the fifth edition of Cartography: Thematic Map Design in 1999. Dent's favored map communication model had been replaced by the theories of critical cartography. Dent acknowledges the value of this new paradigm, but also maintains that “as long as we communicate at all, we need some form of map design to guide us. The central themes of this text are therefore retained, and still, find a place in the education of the thematic cartographer.”

Dent included a new section on geographic information systems in the fifth edition. He said that “regardless of the sophistication of technologies employed in making and designing maps, the process will continue to demand more and more of the creative energies of the designer.”

== Legacy ==
The sixth edition of Cartography: Thematic Map Design was published in 2009, nine years after the death of Dent. Jeffrey Torguson and Thomas Hodler completely revised the text so that it would provide “a more integrated, practical link between cartographic theory and practice for users of GIS, computer mapping, and graphic design software.”
