= Teresa Dent =

British organisation leader (born 1959)

Teresa Ogilvy Dent
- Born: 1959 (age 66–67)
- Occupation: CEO
- Years active: 2001–present
- Employer: Game & Wildlife Conservation Trust

Teresa Ogilvy Dent CBE (born 1959) is the CEO of Game & Wildlife Conservation Trust, a British charitable organisation promoting game and wildlife management as an essential part of nature conservation, since 2001.

== Biography ==
Teresa Dent attended the University of Reading, graduating with a degree in agriculture.

She joined Strutt & Parker as a farming and business management consultant and was a partner at the firm for 13 years. Her next position was with the Game Conservancy Trust (renamed Game & Wildlife Conservation Trust in 2007). She was named CEO of the Trust in 2001. She resides in Salisbury, Wiltshire.

== Memberships and affiliations ==
In 2014 Dent was named to the board of Natural England. She was previously Chairman of the Marlborough Downs Nature Improvement Partnership. She is a board member of the Langholm Moor Demonstration Project.

She is a Fellow of the Royal Agricultural Society of England.

== Awards and honors ==
In June 2015 Dent was named a Commander of the Most Excellent Order of the British Empire (CBE) for "services to wildlife conservation" as part of the 2015 Queen's Birthday Honors.
