= Portland Manor =

Historic house in Maryland, United States

- U.S. National Register of Historic Places
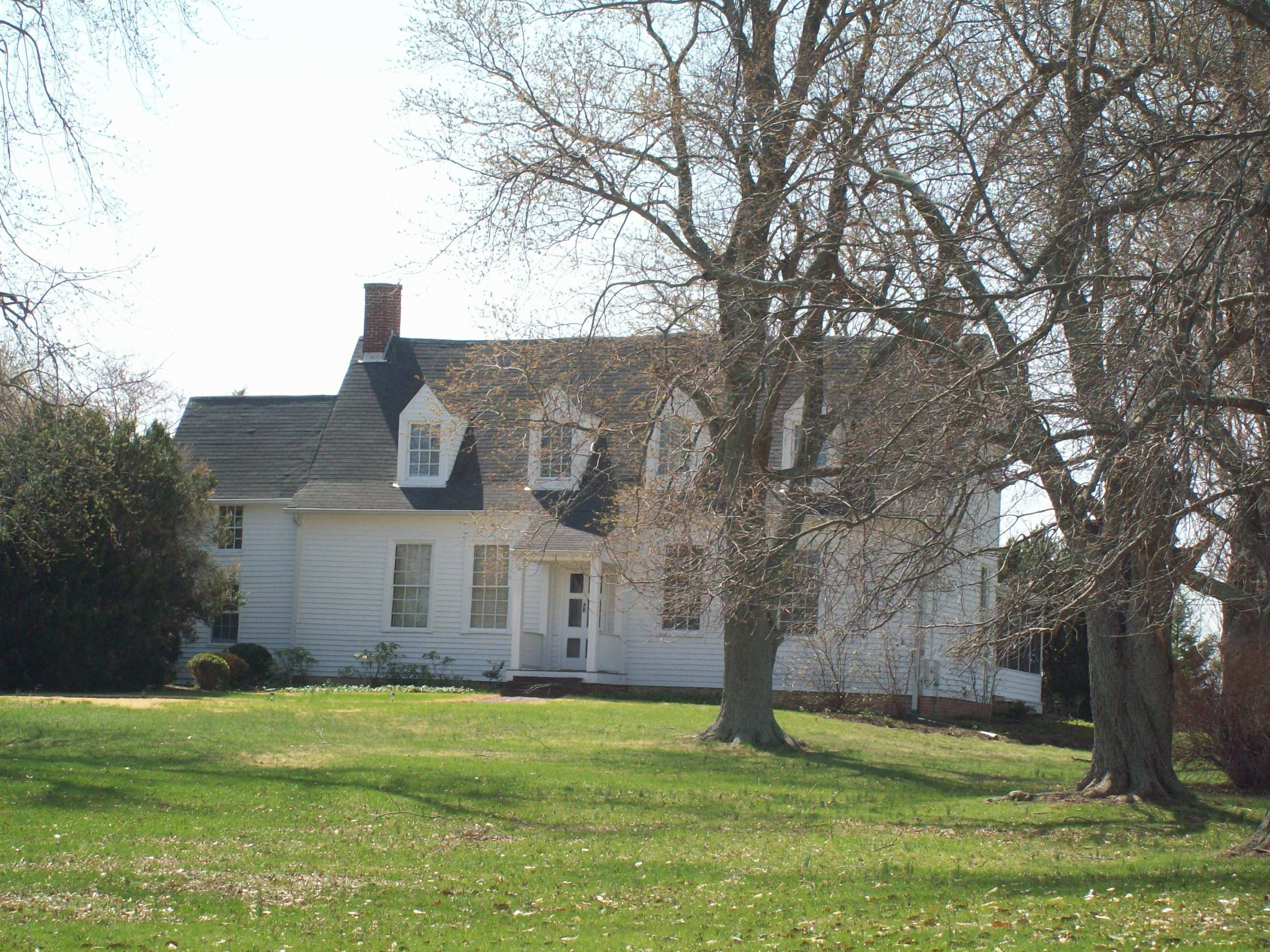
- Portland Manor, March 2010

- Location within Maryland Location within the United States
- Location: 5951 Little Rd., Lothian, Maryland
- Coordinates: 38°47′22″N 76°38′22″W
- Built: 1725
- Architectural style: Colonial
- NRHP reference No.: 96000434
- Added to NRHP: April 18, 1996

Portland Manor is a historic home at Lothian, Anne Arundel County, Maryland, United States. It is a 2-story, center-passage plan, frame building. The main block was constructed in 1754, with the two wings added and enlarged about 1852. Also on the property are the remains of a large circular ice house and several frame outbuildings. Portland Manor was listed on the National Register of Historic Places in 1996.

== History ==
The Portland Manor timber frame manor house is sited on a fenced 3.8-acre portion of an original 2000-acre parcel granted to Jerome White Esq, Surveyor-General of Maryland, by Cecil Calvert, 2nd Baron Baltimore in 1667. The original grant was for 2,000 acres, but White returned to England in 1670. In 1699 1,090 acres of the property were granted to Colonel Henry Darnall, agent for Charles Calvert, 3rd Baron Baltimore. When Henry Darnall died in 1711, the property passed to his grandson Henry Darnall (c. 1700–1782), and then to his son Richard Darnall, who died in 1808. In 1804 Henry Bennett Darnall was born at Portland Manor.

On 1 September 1825 the house and land was listed for sale in the Maryland Gazette, described as "the residence of the late Bennet Darnall Esq Deceased...[including] 590 acres of valuable fertile land, in an excellent state of cultivation, and well adapted to the growth of wheat, corn and tobacco". The main "dwelling house" was described as being "in tolerable good order".

The bulk of the property remained in the hands of Darnall family until 1828, when 340 acres of land was purchased by Richard Estep.

On November 26, 1860, Louisa Ann Darnall, daughter of the wealthy planter Henry Bennett Darnall, married George Biscoe Steuart, member of the Steuart family at Portland Manor.

Although subdivided numerous times since then, the 3.8-acre remnant remains surrounded on three sides by unspoiled farmland and has been carefully maintained and restored over a fifteen-year period, beginning in 1997, by an owner/architect. In 1997, a dendrochronology study concluded that the original construction of Portland Manor occurred in 1754.

In 2001, Portland Manor was recipient of the Anne Arundel County Orlando Ridout Prize for historic preservation.

== Portland Manor today ==
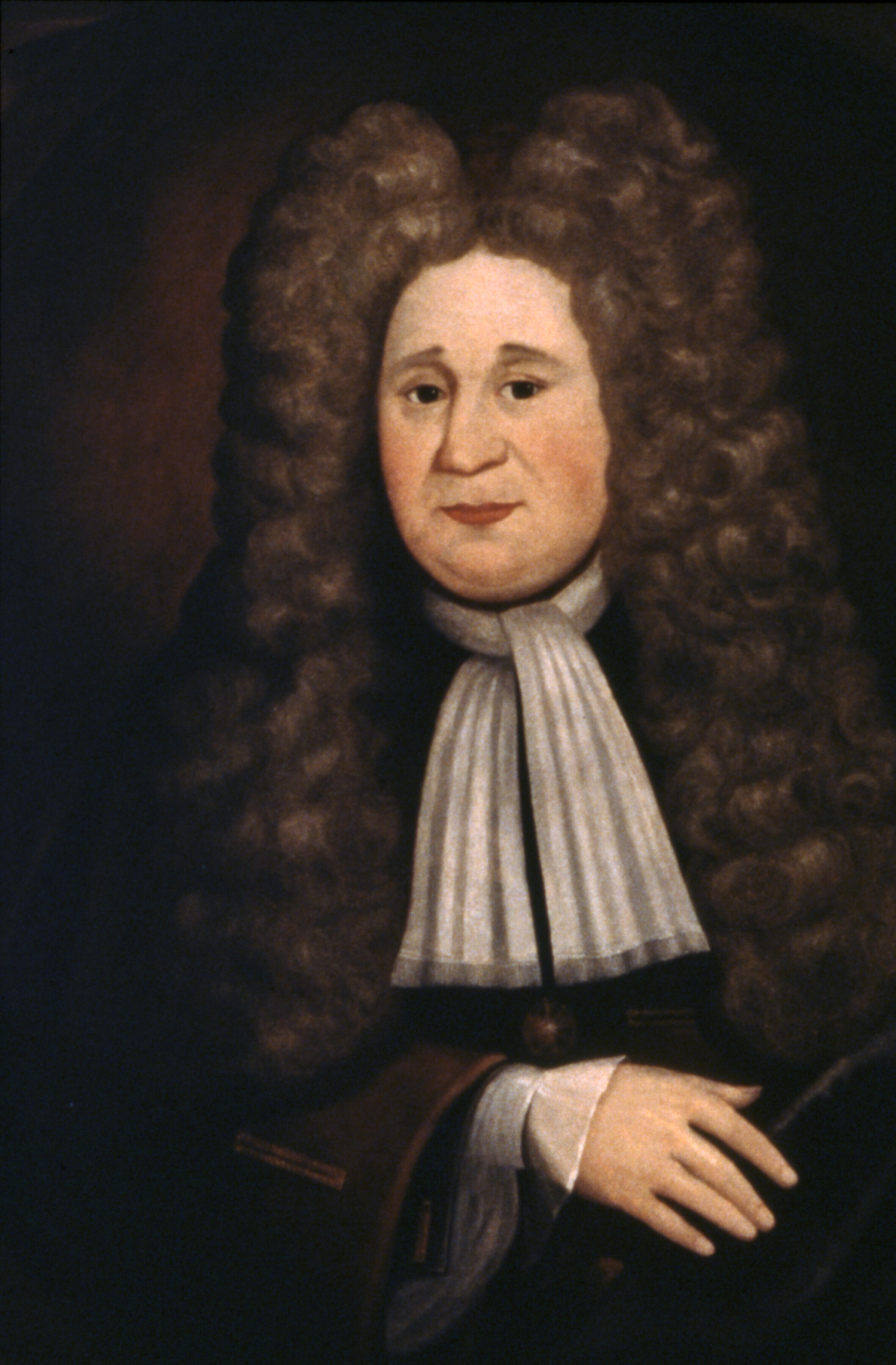
Colonel Henry Darnall of Portland Manor

Today, living spaces on the first floor include a 19' × 22' living room, a 14' × 19' dining room, a sitting room, an office/library, a powder room, and a large country kitchen. The second floor, accessed by the original central staircase and two secondary stairs, includes four large bedrooms, three full baths and a laundry/storage room (equipped with a front-loading washer and dryer and an upright freezer). A large L-shaped porch off the kitchen on the east side overlooks a fence-enclosed perennial and herb garden and pond; a screened porch on the west side is oriented to views of rolling farmland and dramatic sunsets. There is a partial basement measuring approximately 19' × 22'.

The grounds include a variety of mature trees, a boxwood garden and two outbuildings; a 10' × 20' smokehouse, currently used as a garden shop, and a 20' × 30' barn that has been completely restored for use as a workshop/pottery studio and for yard equipment storage. Future archeological investigations may confirm suspected locations for an icehouse and various outbuildings and may add to the various artifacts found by the current owners that are included in a historic display at the second floor hallway.
