= Dent Township, Iron County, Missouri =

Township in Iron County, Missouri, U.S.

Coordinates: 37.6553°N 91.0700°W

Dent Township is an inactive township in Iron County, in the U.S. state of Missouri.

Dent Township was established in 1857, taking its name from Dent County.
