= John H. Dent =

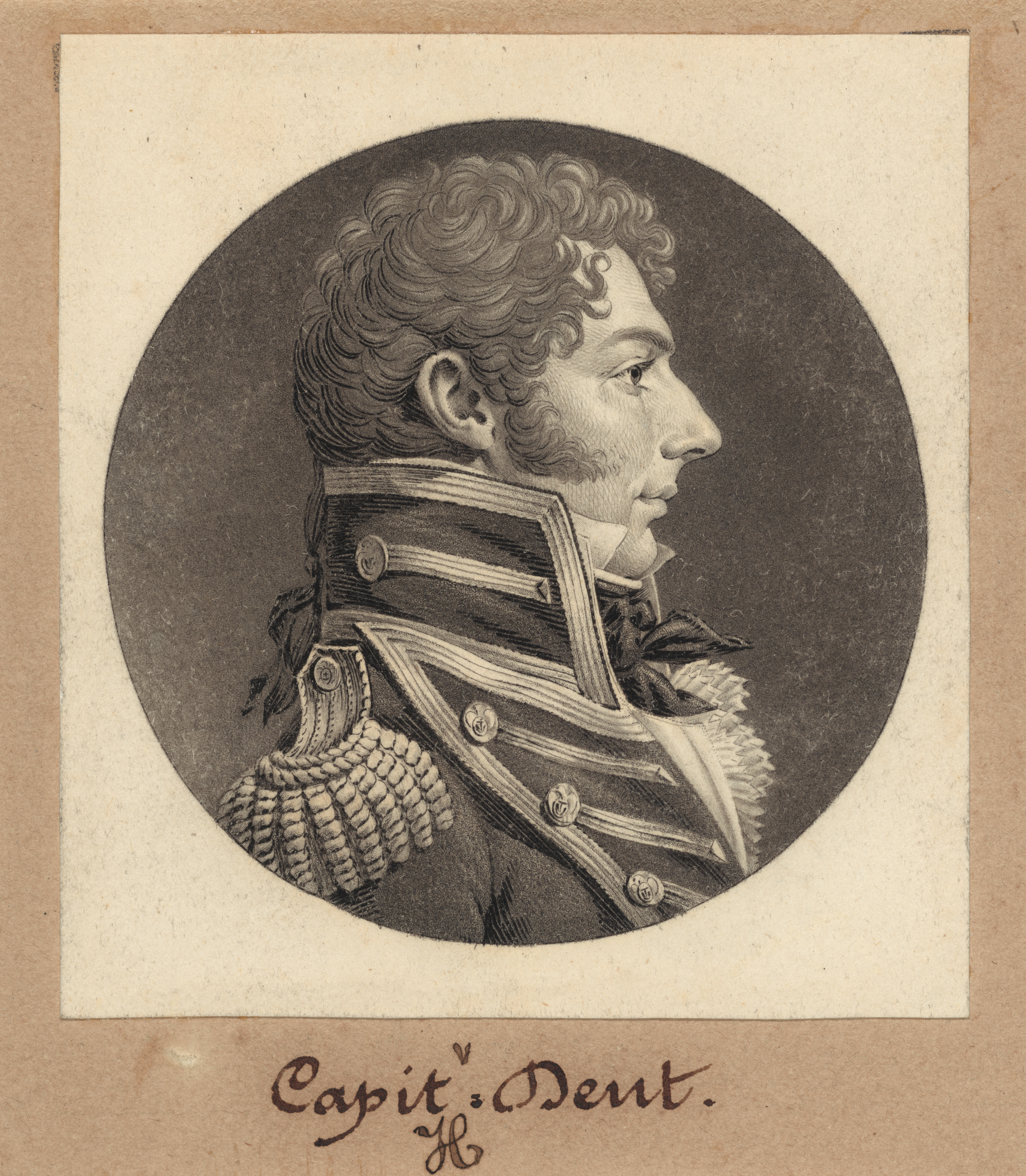
- Captain John H. Dent, USN
- Born: February 22, 1782; Durham Parish, Charles County, Maryland, US
- Died: July 29, 1823; Near Charleston, South Carolina, US
- Burial place: Jacksonboro, South Caroline
- Spouse: Elizabeth Anne Horry
- Military career
- Branch: United States Navy
- Service years: 1798–1815
- Rank: Captain
- Commands: 1804 USS Scourge (1804); 1804 - 1805 USS Nautilus (1799); 1806 - 1809 USS Hornet (1805); 1810 - 1811 USS John Adams (1799)
- Conflicts: First Barbary War; War of 1812

John Herbert Dent (22 February 1782 – 29 July 1823) was an officer in the United States Navy during the Quasi-War, the First Barbary War, and the War of 1812. He was acting captain on the USS Constitution (Old Ironsides) during the attacks on Tripoli in 1804.

== Early years ==
Born in Charles County, Maryland, Dent was the eldest son of Congressman George Dent and Anne (Truman) Dent. His family had arrived in Maryland in the early Colonial days and had a long history of public service. With his parents, we moved to Columbia County, Georgia.

== Navy career ==
At the age of sixteen he was appointed a midshipman 16 March 1798. The Department of Navy had just been created by Congress in response to increasing attacks on merchant ships.

He served on USS Constellation when she captured the French frigate Insurgente on 1 February 1799, and after serving on USS Constitution in the Mediterranean, commanded the schooners Nautilus and Scourge in Preble’s squadron during the First Barbary War, taking part in the attacks on Tripoli. He was in command of Hornet from 1806 to 1809.

During the War of 1812, he was senior officer in charge of U.S. Naval affairs in Charleston, South Carolina.

=== Dates of ranks ===
- Midshipman, 16 March 1798
- Lieutenant, 11 July 1799
- Master commandant 5 September 1804
- Captain 29 December 1811

== Personal life ==
On 7 February 1809, Dent married Elizabeth Anne Horry. They had eight children. Captain Dent never returned to Maryland. He took up plantation life in St. Bartholomew’s Parish in South Carolina, where he died on 29 July 1823. He is buried in Jacksonboro, South Carolina in Bethel Cemetery. The destroyer USS Dent (DD-116) was named for him.
