= Dent (conference) =

- Website type: Conference
- Available in: English
- Headquarters: Sun Valley, Idaho, {{{location_country}}}
- Area served: Worldwide
- Founders: Jason Preston and Steve Broback
- Website: www.dentthefuture.com
- Registration: Invite only
- Launched: 2013 (annual event)
- Current status: Active

Dent (known previously as Dent the Future) is an annual conference in Santa Fe, NM (originally Sun Valley, ID), founded by Jason Preston and Steve Broback. Participants gather in March to "explore the magic and science of visionary leadership and groundbreaking success." 2020 saw the conference go on hiatus before returning in March 2021 for Dent VIII.

== Speakers and presenters ==
Presenters at Dent have included:

- Cathie Black
- Harper Reed
- Alvy Ray Smith
- Kathryn Minshew
- Craig Newmark
- Virginia Postrel
- David Risher
