= USS Dent =

Wickes-class destroyer

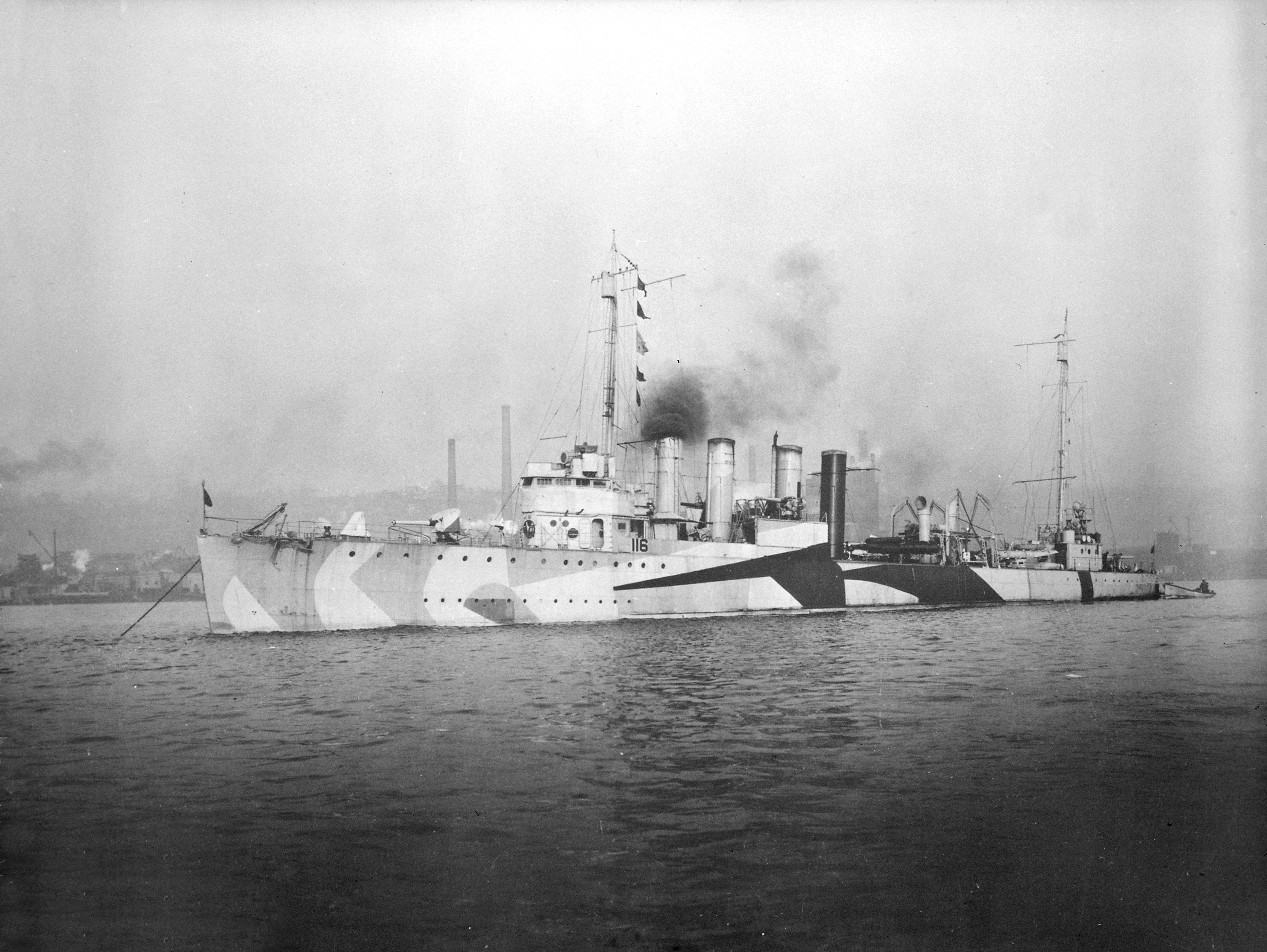
- USS Dent (DD-116)

History

United States
- Namesake: John H. Dent
- Builder: William Cramp & Sons, Philadelphia
- Yard number: 453
- Laid down: 30 August 1917
- Launched: 23 March 1918
- Commissioned: 9 September 1918
- Decommissioned: 7 June 1922
- Recommissioned: 15 May 1930
- Decommissioned: 4 December 1945
- Reclassified: APD-9, 7 March 1943
- Stricken: 3 January 1946
- Fate: Sold, 13 June 1946

General characteristics
- Class & type: Wickes-class destroyer
- Displacement: 1,090 tons
- Length: 314 ft 5 in (95.83 m)
- Beam: 31 ft 8 in (9.65 m)
- Draft: 8 ft 8 in (2.64 m)
- Speed: 35 knots (65 km/h)
- Complement: 100 officers and enlisted
- Armament: 4 × 4 in (102 mm)/50 guns, 12 × 21 inch (533 mm) tt.

USS Dent (DD–116) was a Wickes-class destroyer in the United States Navy during the World War I and later served as APD-9 in World War II. She was named for Captain John H. Dent.

== Construction and commissioning ==
Dent was launched 23 March 1918 by William Cramp & Sons, Philadelphia; sponsored by Miss A. W. Collins, great-granddaughter of Captain Dent; and commissioned 9 September 1918.

== Service history ==
Dent escorted a convoy to Ireland between 19 September and 8 November 1918, and then carried out training at Guantanamo Bay. On 1 May 1919 she got underway from New York to serve on station off Trepassey Harbor, Newfoundland, during the historic first aerial crossing of the Atlantic, a feat accomplished by a Navy seaplane. She returned to Newport on the 24th, and on 20 June she joined the escort for the yacht Imperator, carrying the President of Brazil from New York to Newport.

Dent arrived at San Pedro, California, 6 August 1919 to join the Pacific Fleet. She cruised to Hawaii as escort for New York with the Secretary of the Navy embarked in August, then steamed to Seattle for a Fleet Review in September. She returned to San Diego 22 September and went into reserve. She was placed in active commission again 14 December 1920, and operated with 50 percent of her complement on gunnery and torpedo practice, and in fleet maneuvers. She made a cruise to South America from 7 January to 11 March 1921, visiting Valparaíso, Chile; Costa Rica; and various ports in Mexico. Dent was placed out of commission in reserve 7 June 1922.

Recommissioned 15 May 1930, Dent acted as plane guard for carrier operations, trained reservists, and sailed for a fleet problem in the Caribbean and a visit to the United States East Coast from April to November 1934. On 18 December, she entered the Rotating Reserve at San Diego and tested ordnance until returning to active commission 10 June 1935. Dent operated along the United States West Coast and in the Hawaiian Islands until the United States entered World War II. At San Diego on 7 December 1941, she got underway the next day to screen Saratoga in her high speed run to Pearl Harbor.

=== World War II ===
Returning to San Francisco 29 December 1941, Dent had duty with the Sound School at San Diego and operated along the U.S. West Coast on convoy duty until 27 April 1942 when she sailed for Alaskan waters. From 8 May she operated out of Dutch Harbor on convoy and patrol duty, escorting transports for the invasion of Adak 1 September. She returned to Seattle 30 January 1943 for repairs and conversion to a high-speed transport. She was reclassified APD-9, 7 March 1943.

Dent arrived at Noumea, New Caledonia 20 April 1943. She operated from this base and Espiritu Santo, landing troops in the assaults on New Georgia, Rendova, Vella Lavella, and Cape Torokina, Bougainville. After overhaul at Sydney, Australia, in November, she returned to Milne Bay, New Guinea on 17 December. While training at Cape Sudest 5 days later, she grounded on an uncharted shoal. Serious structural damage necessitated her return to Australia for repairs through January 1944.

Dent arrived at Nouméa 7 February 1944 and landed men of the 4th Marines on Emirau Island 20 March. From Milne Bay, New Guinea, she carried soldiers to the Aitape landings 22 April. Sailing from New Guinea 9 May, she returned to the Solomons to train an underwater demolition team for the invasion of the Marianas. She carried her team to Roi where they were transferred for transportation to Guam, then escorted Mazama to Saipan to carry emergency supplies of ammunition to the bombardment ships. Dent patrolled off Saipan and Tinian until early July when she escorted transports to Eniwetok and sailed for overhaul at San Diego, arriving 3 August.

From 8 November 1944 until the end of the war, Dent served with the Amphibious Training Force, Pacific Fleet, at San Diego. She sailed 20 October 1945 for the U.S. East Coast, arriving at Philadelphia 6 November. Dent was decommissioned there 4 December 1945 and sold 13 June 1946.

== Awards ==
Dent received five battle stars for World War II service.

As of 2012, no other ships of this name have served in the United States Navy.
