= Harry Dent (disambiguation) =

Harry Dent may refer to:

- Harry S. Dent Sr. (1930–2007), American political strategist
- Harry Dent (Harry S. Dent, Jr., born 1953), American financial newsletter writer
- Harold Dent (1894–1995), wartime editor of the Times Educational Supplement
