= John Hart (colonial administrator) =

British colonial administrator (died 1740)

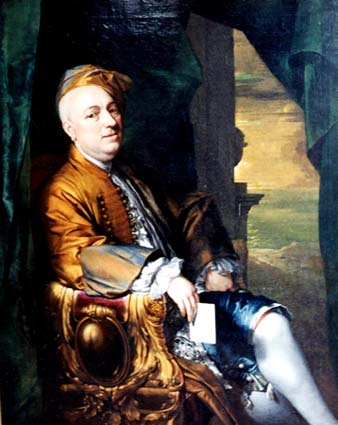
- Portrait by Herman van der Mijn, 1732

12th Royal Governor of Maryland
- In office 1714–1715
- Preceded by: Edward Lloyd

1st Governor of Restored Proprietary Government
- In office 1715–1720
- Succeeded by: Thomas Brooke, Jr.

Governor of the Leeward Islands
- In office 1721–1728
- Preceded by: Walter Hamilton
- Succeeded by: Thomas Pitt

Personal details
- Born: County Cavan, Ireland
- Died: c. 1740 England

John Hart (died c. 1740) was a British colonial administrator who served as the governor of Maryland from 1714 to 1715 and again from 1715 to 1720, after the restoration of proprietary control to Charles Calvert, 5th Baron Baltimore. His governorship marked the beginnings of the restoration of the Calvert family's control of Maryland.

== Early life and family ==
John Hart was born in Ireland into an Anglo-Irish family. He was a native of County Cavan. He was the son of Merrick Hart, of Crovert, and his wife Lettice Vesey. His maternal uncle was Archbishop John Vesey. Very few details of his early life survive, other than the fact that he served in Spain and Portugal during the War of the Spanish Succession.

John Hart married the widow Mary Purefoy, daughter of Henry Hart and Anne Beresford, daughter of Sir Tristram Beresford, 1st Baronet. They had two children: a son Thomas, and a daughter Marylandia.

== Governor of Maryland ==
Benedict Calvert, 4th Baron Baltimore had witnessed his family's loss of their proprietary Province of Maryland in 1689, in part because of his family's Roman Catholic religion. Calvert calculated that the chief impediment to the restoration of his family's title to Maryland was his Catholicism, and he therefore converted to Anglicanism, deciding to "embrace the protestant religion", and gambling that this move would win back his family's lost fortune in the New World. Such a bold move would come at a cost. Benedict's father Charles Calvert, 3rd Baron Baltimore, furious at his son's apostacy, withdrew his annual allowance of £450 and ended his support for his grandchildren's education and maintenance. Benedict was able to persuade the Crown to grant him an allowance of £300 a year, and Queen Anne even acceded to his nomination of John Hart as governor of the province, on condition that Hart would share with Calvert £500 per annum out of his profits from the office.

Hart's governorship therefore marked the beginnings of the restoration of the Calvert family's control of Maryland.

Hart and his family immigrated to Maryland in 1714. In 1715, Hart took a 31 year lease on a 200 acre plantation. They returned to England in 1720.

== Governor of the Leeward Islands ==
After the end of his time as governor of Maryland, Hart was appointed governor of the Leeward Islands, a position which he held from 1721–1727. He was succeeded in the position by Thomas Pitt, 1st Earl of Londonderry.
