= Dent Island =

Dent Island is the name of several places:

- Dent Island, New Zealand, an island belonging to the Campbell Island group
- Dent Island (Queensland), one of the Whitsunday Islands in Australia
- Dent Island, British Columbia, an island in British Columbia, Canada
- Dent Island, Ontario, an island in Ontario, Canada
