= John Charles Dent =

Canadian journalist, author and historian

- Born: November 8, 1841; Kendal, Westmorland, England
- Died: September 27, 1888 (aged 46); Toronto, Ontario
- Occupations: Journalist, historian
- Spouse: Elsie McIntosh (m. 1866)
- Writing career
- Period: 19th century
- Genre: History

John Charles Dent (November 8, 1841 – September 27, 1888) was a Canadian journalist, author and historian. Dent has been compared to American historian Francis Parkman for his ability to write about Canadian history without being dull and dry.

He was born in Kendal, Westmorland, England. Shortly after his birth, his family emigrated to the Canadian West. Dent received his primary education in Canadian schools, studied law in Brantford, Ontario, and became an attorney in 1865. He practised law for a few years, but found the profession did not suit him, and was drawn to pursue literary endeavours instead. He accordingly relinquished his practice as soon as he felt himself in a position to do so, and went to England. He developed his journalistic skills working for The Daily Telegraph. He also contributed a series of articles to the periodical Once a Week. He supported his wife and family as a writer, concentrating on work that could be quickly written and readily sold. Accordingly, Dent produced no particularly ambitious work in England.

After remaining in England for several years, Dent and his family moved to the U.S. in 1867. He obtained a position in Boston, which he held for about two years. Then he went to Toronto, having accepted a position on the editorial staff of the Toronto Evening Telegram, which was then just starting. For several years Dent was a journalist for various newspapers, but principally the Toronto Weekly Globe. To that journal he contributed a very notable series of biographical sketches on "Eminent Canadians".

In 1880, soon after the death of George Brown, founder of the Globe, Dent severed his connection with that paper and began his first ambitious undertaking, The Canadian Portrait Gallery (1880), which ran to four large volumes. It contained biographies of Canadian public figures, living and dead, carefully prepared, and written without partisanship. This book attained a considerable circulation, and brought to its author a comparatively large sum of money.

Dent's second book was The Last Forty Years: Canada since the Union of 1841, which received praise. His third work was a History of the Rebellion in Upper Canada (1885–6). Through careful research, Dent was able to throw new light on the characters of the men who took part in the Upper Canada Rebellion. This work met with severe criticism when first published, as it contradicted commonly held beliefs at the time.

In writing history, he was in accord with Thomas Babington Macaulay. He believed that a true story should be told as agreeably as a fictitious one; "that the incidents of real life, whether political or domestic, admit of being so arranged as, without detriment to accuracy, to command all the interest of an artificial series of facts; that the chain of circumstances which constitute history may be as finely and gracefully woven as any tale of fancy."

He also wrote sketches, essays and stories. A collection of his stories was published posthumously in The Gerrard Street mystery and other weird tales (1888). Dent was elected to fellowship in the Royal Society of Canada in 1887. He was said to be light-hearted, witty and genial.

== Works ==
- Canadian Notabilities, (1880)
- The Canadian Portrait Gallery, (1880–81)
- The Last Forty Years: Canada Since The Union Of 1841, (1881)
- The Story Of The Upper Canadian Rebellion, (1885)
- The Gerrard Street Mystery, And Other Weird Tales, (1888)
