= Dent Mowrey =

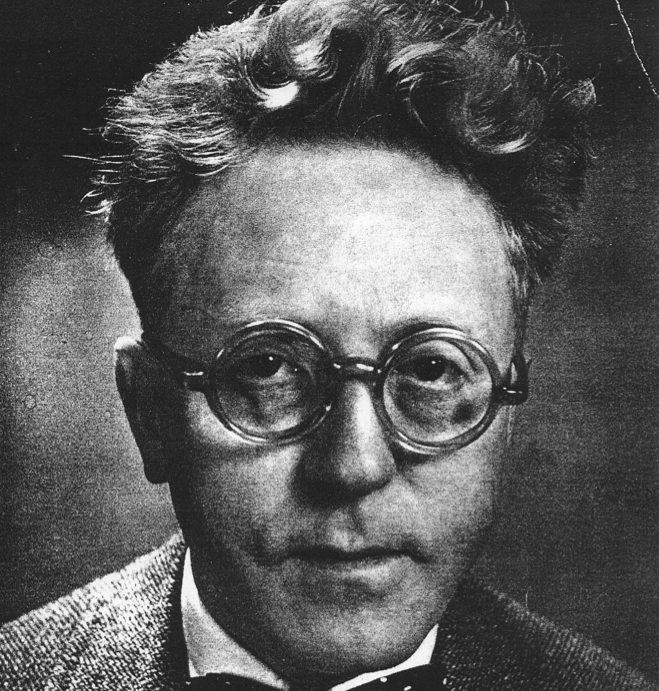
Dent Mowrey

Archibald Denton "Dent" Mowrey (1886–1960) was an American composer, musician and music teacher who lived in Oregon from 1916 until his death in 1960.

== Early life ==
Mowrey grew up in Ogden, Utah, where he graduated from public high school and took lessons with Squire Coop. A 1909 notice for an Ogden Easter service lists him as both a string quartet member and a cello soloist. His father, Archibald Y. "Archie" Mowrey, was a housepainter and his mother, Lauretta Melissa "Lettie" (née Hall), a dressmaker. As a child, Mowrey visited Oregon with his mother and fell in love with the state.

While some sources make the romantic claim that Mowrey wed his wife in Paris, the truth lives closer to home: a week after achieving majority on his 21st birthday, Dent married Myrtle Eve (née Gibson) on June 19, 1907 in Weber County, Utah.

Mowrey's musical talents led him to the prestigious Leipzig Conservatory in Germany. There he studied piano with Robert Teichmuller and composition with Max Reger, graduating with honors in 1911 or 1912 (sources vary on the date). After graduation he went to Paris for further piano study with Harold Bauer and composition coaching with Albert Wolff. He became friends with Claude Debussy and gave recitals in Paris. His setting of George Eliot's poem The Spanish Gypsy was hailed by Mowrey's hometown newspaper as "the first time an American composer has been heard at the Sorbonne".

== Growing career ==
Upon returning to the United States for vacation in late July 1914, Dent and Eve planned to visit Salt Lake City, San Francisco, and other Pacific coast locales. However, the onset of World War I in Europe during the week of their arrival made returning to live in France at the end of their trip impossible. Planned recitals in Paris and London for the fall concert season had to be abandoned.

Artist Helen Lawrence Walters' Portland diary for Jan. 31, 1916 mentions Mowrey as someone whom she thought "quite bright." By 1918 Mowrey seems to have become a member of the faculty of the Cornish School of Music in Seattle, Washington. Throughout this period, Mowrey regularly appears in announcements and special features in newspapers from all around the Northwest.

Mowrey's mother, Lettie, was house mother for the Kappa Kappa Gamma (Beta Omega chapter) women's residential honors house at the University of Oregon in Eugene, OR. A newspaper notice from January 14, 1924 lists the composer-pianist as playing "under the auspices of Kappa Kappa Gamma" in the "women's building" a piano recital of works by Beethoven, Chopin, Debussy, Schubert, and Brahms, among others, as well as excerpts from his own Spanish Gypsy dances and The Gargoyles of Notre Dame.

After the Great War ended, Mowrey's connections with European musicians persisted. In November 1924 the Music Trade Indicator announced that "Portland's most prominent composer-pianist left recently for Paris, accompanied by his wife. Mr. Mowrey intends to continue his studies and incidentally do a little teaching while 'Over There'."

The couple eventually settled in Portland where Mowrey continued his career as a concert pianist, teacher, and composer. Mowrey's death certificate states he had lived in the city for 33 years, placing the start of his date of residence to 1927.

== Mowrey as teacher ==
In 1928 Mowrey convinced the owner of the new Pacific Building, then the tallest building in Portland, to build a piano studio on the rooftop. Students rode the elevator to the roof and took lessons in the glass-walled studio, playing alongside Mowrey on one of two rare 9-foot Chickering grand pianos. According to Dolores Hsu, a student in the early 1940s, the acoustics were spectacular, and the music floated out from the rooftop garden that few below knew existed

An early and influential member of the Oregon Music Teachers Association, Mowrey created music that other teachers valued for developing their students' technique. At least a dozen of these works were published by G. Schirmer. Mowrey was also an early member of the Society of Oregon Composers and the Musicians Club of Portland.

On the eve of the Wall Street crash of 1929, the September issue of Music and Musicians noted Mowrey's busy and successful teaching activities, as well as his favorite sports: swimming, tennis, hiking, and climbing.

Numerous students took lessons with Mowrey in Portland for both piano and composition over the years, including Ella Connel Jesse, Lillian Pettibone, Emil Enna, Franck Eichenlaub, Arthur Boardman, Otto Wedemeyer, P. A. Ten Haaf, George Hopkins, and Blythe Owen. Three letters from Mowrey to Owen, including one written from his Paris studio in 1925, are held in Owen's archives at the Center for Adventist Research on the campus of Andrews University in Berrien Springs, Michigan.

== Mowrey as composer ==
Mowrey composed for the piano, vocal ensembles, band, woodwind and string ensembles, and orchestra. The Portland Symphony Society, now known as the Oregon Symphony, premiered several of his works starting with his orchestration of his solo piano work "The Gargoyles of Notre Dame" on the orchestra's first national radio broadcast in 1927.

While living abroad, he journeyed with Eve through the North African Sahara with a Bedouin caravan to research the native music there. The resulting "Bedouin Melody" was performed in a 1927 recital by eleven members of the Portland Symphony Orchestra woodwind section accompanying the composer on the celesta. It is unclear if this piece with celesta was the precursor to his fully-orchestrated "African" piano concerto or a distinct work; the latter seems to have been complete by 1938. This "Piano Concerto (Africa)", which Mowrey played with a number of West Coast symphonies, gave his impression of the contrasting civilizations of ancient and modern Africa.

== Legacy ==
Mowrey did not seek the limelight and tended to be unassuming and private. In the late 1950s, his home was broken into. He and his wife Eve were locked in a closet. When they were finally found, the experience left them in a reclusive state, and Mowrey's heart condition was worsened.

After Mowrey's death in 1960, a report was given to the Oregon Historical Society along with concert programs, recital announcements, and lists of his published and unpublished works. His musical compositions were donated to the Multnomah County Library in downtown Portland. Many of the pieces were not catalogued and sat in storage until 2009.

Allan Halbert, a conductor/music director in Oregon, was intrigued with the idea of reviving Mowrey's music. When asked about the collection, the library decided to designate it as rare book material. The works, mostly manuscripts in Mowrey's hand and written in pencil, were relocated to the John Wilson Special Collections room. As rare book material, they could not be checked out or photocopied, and the only option at the time was to photograph them. Halbert photographed nearly one thousand pages of unpublished and unrecorded works and then began the process of restoring the music to a playable condition. This included retracing the notes and other markings with a pencil, creating missing parts, and correcting discrepancies between the scores and parts. Under Halbert's direction, in June 2010 the Starlight Symphony of Tigard, Oregon, gave a concert including "The Gargoyles of Notre Dame."

== Compositions ==
=== Piano ===
| Title | Genre | Publisher | Place | Date |
|---|---|---|---|---|
| Soft Shoe Dancer | Ragtime | Carl Fisher | New York | 1933 |

=== Orchestra ===
| Title | Genre | Publisher | Place | Date |
|---|---|---|---|---|
| The Gargoyles of Notre Dame | tone poem | | | |

=== Voice ===
| Title | Genre | Publisher | Place | Date |
|---|---|---|---|---|
| Spanish Gypsy | piano with recitation | | | |
