= Thomas Dent Sr. =

English-born justice and politician (1630–1676)

Colonel Thomas Dent

Member of the Maryland House of Delegates for St. Mary's County
- In office May 19, 1674 – February 24, 1675
- In office April 13, 1669 – May 8, 1669

Personal details
- Born: c. 1630 Guisborough, North Riding of Yorkshire, England
- Died: April 22, 1676 (aged 45–46) St. Mary's County, Maryland, British America
- Spouse: Rebecca Wilkinson (m. 1659)
- Children: 6
- Relatives: Thomas Brooke Jr. (son-in-law)
- Profession: Justice; sheriff; militia officer; politician
- Military career
- Branch: Maryland Colonial Militia
- Service years: 1660–1676
- Rank: Colonel

Colonel Thomas Dent (c. 1630 – April 22, 1676) was an English-born colonial justice, sheriff, militia officer, and politician who served as Member of the Lower House of the Maryland General Assembly (now known as the Maryland House of Delegates) in 1669, and again from 1674 to 1675. He was also the father-in-law of Thomas Brooke Jr., who served as the acting colonial governor of Maryland.

== Early life ==
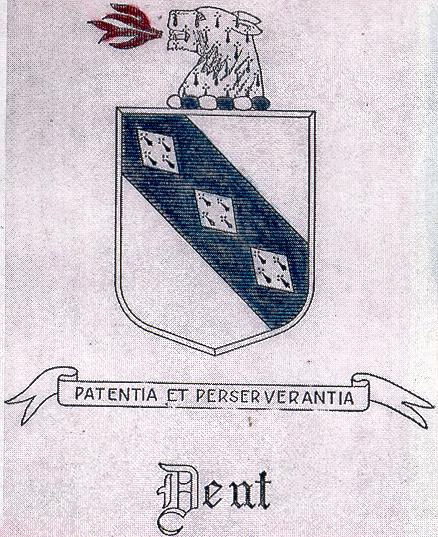
The coat of arms of the Dent family

Thomas Dent was born in around 1630 at Guisborough, in the North Riding of Yorkshire, England. He was the third of six children born to Peter (c. 1600–1671) and Margaret Dent (née Nicholson; 1602–1687). Dent's father was a local apothecary and property owner, while his mother was the daughter of the Reverend John Nicholson, who was the vicar of Hutton Cranswick.

== Political career ==
Thomas was a justice of St. Mary's County beginning in 1661, and became sheriff there in 1665, became coroner in 1669, and alderman in 1673. Thomas was a member of the Lower House, St. Mary's County from 1669 to 1675.

== Marriage ==
Thomas wedded Rebecca Wilkinson (1633–1726) in 1659. Rebecca was the Virginia born daughter of the Rev. William Wilkinson (1612–1676) who emigrated from England and his first wife, Naomi Hughes (1616–1634). After Thomas died, Rebecca married in 1677 Col. John Addison (d. 1705), a bachelor who then returned to England and died there intestate. Col. Addison profited from this marriage, and this alienated the Dent children from their mother.

== Property ==
Thomas received a patent of land lying in Charles County (present-day southeast Washington DC) called "Gisbrough" on May 5, 1663. Thomas accumulated over 1,000 acres (4 km^{2}) of land, plus 3 plantations of unspecified area. His estate was valued at 596.8.0 pounds sterling, including 6 slaves, 8 servants, and books.

== Death ==
Thomas died April 22, 1676, in St. Mary's Co., Maryland.

== Other Family ==
Certainly related and using the same coat of arms, Thomas was the uncle or perhaps older brother of Capt. John Dent, Gent. (ca. 1645–1712), who married Mary Hatch.

== Children ==
1. Col. William Dent Sr., Gent. (1660–1705), who married 1) Elizabeth Fowke (1668–1703), daughter of Col. Gerard Fowke Sr. (1625–1669) and Anne (Thoroughgood) Chandler (1630). 2) Sarah Brooke (1683–1724), daughter of Col. Thomas Brooke Jr., Hon. (1660–1730) and second wife, Barbara Dent (1676–1754). Sarah married secondly, Capt. Philip Lee Sr., Hon., Esq. (1681–1744) of "Blenheim".

2. Margaret Dent (1662–1712), who married Edmund Howard, Gent. (1659–1712), a Justice and clerk of Charles Co., Maryland.

3. Thomas Dent Jr. (ca. 1663), no further information.

4. Peter Dent (ca. 1665–1711), who married 1) Elizabeth (Ballard) King Wilson, widow of John King and Thomas Wilson, and daughter of Charles Ballard (died 1682). 2) Jane Pittman Gray, daughter of Joseph Gray (died 1724).

5. George Dent (1666–ca. 1702), no further information.

6. Barbara Dent (1676–1754), who married Col. Thomas Brooke Jr., Hon. (1660–1730), son of Maj. Thomas Brooke Sr., Esq. (1632–1676) and his second wife Eleanor Hatton (1642–1725).

== Ancestry ==
Thomas was the son of Peter Dent II, Gent. (ca. 1600–1647) and Margaret Nicholson (1602–1647). Peter was born at Ormesby, North Riding of Yorkshire, England. He lived 6 miles away in Guisborough, North Riding of Yorkshire, England. The town and valley of Dent is about 70 miles west of Guisborough. Peter died in August 1647 at Guisborough. Margaret was born at Hutton, Yorkshire, England.

Margaret was the daughter of Rev. John Nicholson (1576–1655).

Peter II, was the son of Peter Dent I, Gent., of Ormesby (d.ca. 1642), a Parish in North Riding of Yorkshire, now part of Middlesbrough.

Peter was the son of James Dent (1575), Gent. of Ormesby.

James was the son of William Dent (1520).

William was in turn the son of Robert Dent (1500) and Anne Fenwycke.

Other info

Thomas Dent's son William had a son, Peter, who had a son, Peter Jr. Peter Jr. had a son, George, who had a son Frederick, who married Ellen Bray Wrenshall. Their daughter, Julia, was the wife of Ulysses S. Grant, the 18th President of the United States.

Captain John Dent came into Maryland about 1658 with Thomas Dent who claimed land rights in 1663 for his transportation, and in that year John Dent witnessed a conveyance of William Hatton to Thomas Dent. The year previous or 1662 he witnessed the last will and testament of William Hewes who bequeathed his entire estate to William Hatton of William and William Dent of Thomas. In 1695 he employed William Dent of Thomas his attorney to institute legal action against on Lemaister. In those years it is therefore evident that he was in close association with Thomas Dent and was a freeholder of age.
