= Catholic Church in the Thirteen Colonies =

American religious persecution

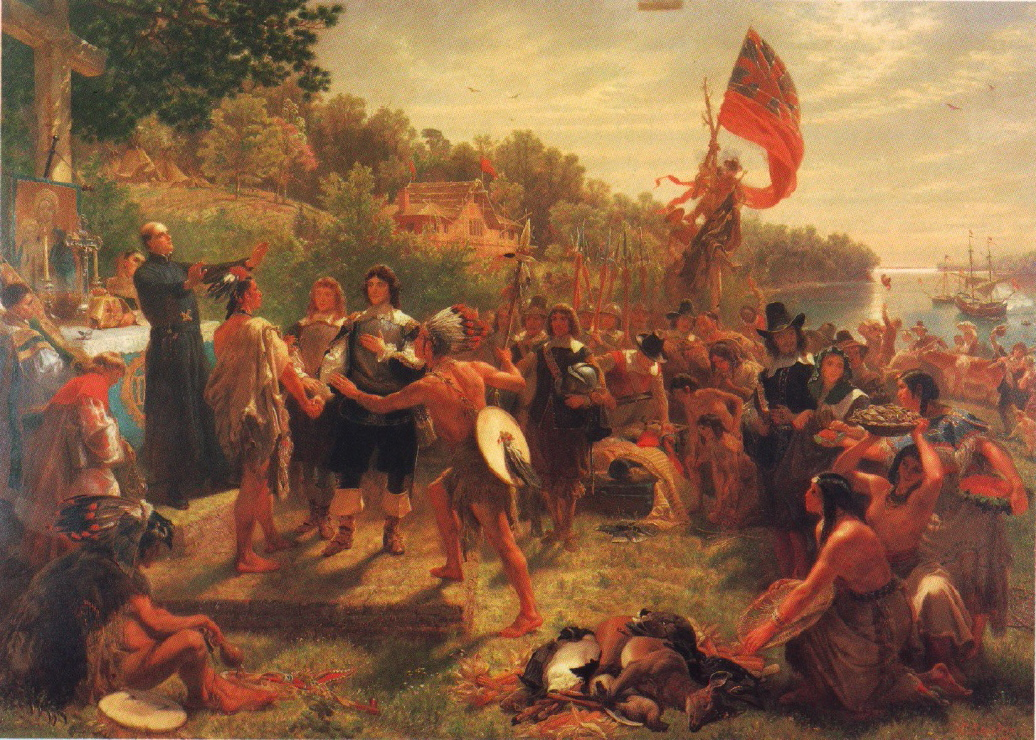
The Founding of Maryland (1634) depicts Father Andrew White, a Jesuit missionary (on the left) and colonists meeting the people of the Yaocomico branch of the Piscatawy Indian Nation in St. Mary's City, Maryland, the site of Maryland's first colonial settlement.

The situation of the Catholic Church in the Thirteen Colonies was characterized by an extensive religious persecution originating from Protestant sects, which would barely allow religious toleration to Catholics living on American territory. Nonetheless, Catholics were a part of colonial history from the beginning, especially in Maryland, a colony founded by Catholics, and Rhode Island, a colony founded explicitly for religious toleration. The situation was complicated greatly by the evolving role of the English Crown, which acted as both Supreme Governor of the Church of England and the Head of State of the thirteen colonial governments in almost all periods of colonial rule.

== Origins of anti-Catholicism ==
American anti-Catholicism has its origins in the Reformation. Puritan colonists, such as the Pilgrims of Plymouth Colony, opposed not only the Catholic Church but also the Church of England, which they believed perpetuated some Catholic doctrine and practices, and for that reason deemed it to be insufficiently Reformed. Protestants discontented with the Church of England formed the earliest religious settlements in North America. Monsignor John Tracy Ellis wrote that a "universal anti-Catholic bias was brought to Jamestown in 1607 and vigorously cultivated in all the thirteen colonies from Massachusetts to Georgia."

Some colonies supported an established church, which received tax support from the colonial legislature.

== Colonies ==
=== Virginia ===
Eighty-one years before the coming of the English to Jamestown in 1607, a settlement was made in Virginia by Spaniards from San Domingo, under the leadership of Lucas Vázquez de Ayllón. Accompanied by the Dominican Fathers Antonio de Montesinos and Antonio de Cervantes with Brother Peter de Estrada, the expedition set sail in three vessels from Puerto de la Plata, in June 1526. The severity of the winter, the rebellion of the settlers, and the hostility of the natives caused the abandonment of the settlement in the spring of 1527.

In 1624 Virginia was made a crown colony. Because of the establishment of the English Church, hostility was shown to adherents of other beliefs and to Catholics in particular. Lord Baltimore attempted in vain to plant a Catholic colony in Virginia (1629–30). Stringent legislation was enacted against Catholics. In 1641 a decree declared that adherents of the pope were to be fined 1000 pounds of tobacco if they attempted to hold office. The following year all priests were given five days within which to leave the colony. In 1661 all persons were obliged to attend the Established services or pay a fine of £20. The governor issued orders to magistrates, sheriffs, constables, and people to be diligent in the apprehension and bringing to justice of all Catholic priests. The records of Norfolk County (1687) show Fathers Edmonds and Raymond arrested. In 1699 Catholics were deprived of their right of voting, and later a fine of 500 pounds of tobacco was imposed upon violators of the law. They were declared incompetent as witnesses in 1705, and in 1753 such incompetency was made to cover all cases.

=== Massachusetts ===
Massachusetts was first settled by English religious dissenters. Quakers, Jews, and Catholics were not permitted in the colony. Catholics avoided Massachusetts during the colonial period after laws passed in 1647 and 1700 forbade Catholic priests to reside in the colony under pain of imprisonment and execution. Despite many of the British colonists, such as the Puritans and Congregationalists, fleeing religious persecution by the Church of England, much of early American religious culture exhibited the anti-Catholic bias of these Protestant denominations.

Near the close of the reign of Charles I (d. 1649), the forced emigration of the Irish brought many to Massachusetts. However, their number is hard to estimate because the law obliged all Irishmen in certain towns of Ireland to take English surnames—the names of some small town, of a color, of a particular trade or office, or of a certain art or craft.

=== New Hampshire ===
Abenaki natives, converted by Jesuit missionaries from Quebec, were the first Catholics of New Hampshire. Originally settled by Anglicans, in 1641 New Hampshire came under the jurisdiction of Massachusetts.

Few Catholics appear among the early settlers, as they were banned by the charter of the Plymouth Council, which excluded from New England all who had not taken the Oath of Supremacy. Catholics were denied the right of freemen under the Royal Commission of 1679, which required the Oath of Supremacy, and this was endorsed by the General Assembly held at Portsmouth the following year; and in 1696 a test oath was imposed on the people under pain of fine or imprisonment. The proscription of Catholics continued under the state constitution even after the adoption of the federal constitution.

=== Maryland ===
Catholicism was introduced to the English colonies in 1634 with the founding of the Province of Maryland by Cecil Calvert, 2nd Baron Baltimore, a Roman Catholic Anglo-Irish Peer, based on a charter granted to his father George Calvert, 1st Baron Baltimore. The first settlers were accompanied by two Jesuit missionaries travelling as gentlemen adventurers.

However, the 1646 defeat of the Royalists in the English Civil War led to stringent laws against Catholic education and the extradition of known Jesuits from the colony, including Andrew White, and the destruction of their school at Calverton Manor. During the greater part of the Maryland colonial period, Jesuits continued to conduct Catholic schools clandestinely from their manor house in Newtowne. (See Plundering Time).

After Virginia established Anglicanism as mandatory in the colony, many Puritans migrated from Virginia to Maryland. The government gave them land for a settlement called Providence (now called Annapolis). In 1650, the Puritans revolted against the proprietary government and set up a new government that outlawed both Catholicism and Anglicanism. In March 1655, the 2nd Lord Baltimore sent an army under Governor William Stone to put down this revolt. Near Annapolis, his Catholic army was decisively defeated by a Puritan army in what was to be known as the "Battle of the Severn". The Puritan revolt lasted until 1658, when the Calvert family regained control and re-enacted the Toleration Act. This was overturned again during the time of the Glorious Revolution when Protestants in Maryland rose up again and deposed the Catholic led government of the colony, establishing Protestantism as the official religion of the colony until after the American Revolution.

=== Connecticut ===
The first English settlement was established on the Connecticut River at Windsor by traders from the Plymouth Colony in 1633. In the same year the Dutch from New Amsterdam had sailed up the river and erected a trading house and fort where the city of Hartford now stands, a few miles below Windsor. The Dutch soon after withdrew, leaving the English to establish the first permanent settlements within the boundaries of Connecticut. In 1664 the New Haven Colony, then comprising the various settlements along the coast, was forced to unite with those in the Connecticut valley, thus forming one commonwealth thereafter known as Connecticut. The vast majority of the population remained distinctively English of Puritan origin. Congregationalism was the established religion supported by public taxation.

=== Rhode Island ===
The earliest settlers in Rhode Island were led by Roger Williams and other refugees from Massachusetts. Rhode Island was the first colony to declare freedom of religion for all faiths, including all denominations of Christianity, in 1636. In 1739 there were thirty-three churches in the colony; twelve Baptist, ten Quaker, six Congregational or Presbyterian, and five Episcopalian. It is said that in 1680 there was not one Catholic in the colony, and for a long period their number must have been small.

=== Delaware ===
The area of Delaware was first settled by Swedish colonists under the leadership of Peter Minuit, former governor of New Amsterdam. In 1655 the Swedish settlements surrendered to the Dutch, who in 1664 surrendered to the English. From its earliest settlement, at no time did religious intolerance ever appear in the government of the Swedish colony which grew into the State of Delaware.

Prior to 1772 no definite records are obtainable regarding any regularly established Catholic church in the present State of Delaware. The Catholics in the State prior to the latter part of the eighteenth century were very few in number. In 1730 Cornelius Hallahan, an Irish Catholic settled in Mill Creek Hundred in New Castle Country on an estate called by him Cuba Rock, near the present location of Mount Cuba, Delaware. The first Catholic services in the State were probably held at his house. The Apoquiniminck Mission, in the lower part of New Castle Country, was established before 1750 by Jesuits from St. Francis Xavier's Mission in Cecil County, Maryland. In a 1748 report from the Episcopal Mission at Dover (Kent Country) to the clergymen of the Pennsylvania province, it is stated that the "Quakers and Roman Catholics were long accustomed to bury their dead at their own plantations." Again in 1751 a like report from the Dover Mission states: "There are about five or six families of Papists, who are attended once a month from Maryland with a priest." In January 1772, Father Matthew Sittensperger, a Jesuit known under the name of Manners, purchased a farm in Mill Creek Hundred which was known as Coffee Run, and here a log chapel called St. Mary's and a residence were erected. Father Sittensperger was succeeded by the Rev. Stephen Faure who, with other Frenchmen, was driven from St. Domingo by slave uprisings and settled at Wilmington.

In 1785 Delaware was one of the four states (the others being Pennsylvania, Maryland, and Virginia) where Catholics were not virtually under civil disabilities.

=== North Carolina ===
In 1663 Charles II, of Catholic sympathies, granted to Sir George Carteret and seven others a stretch of land on the Atlantic coast, lying between Virginia and Florida. The grantees were created "absolute lords proprietors" of the province of Carolina, with full powers to make and execute such laws as they deemed proper. In 1674 the population was about four thousand. After 1729 Carolina became a royal province, the king having purchased from the proprietors seven-eighths of their domain. Under the lords proprietors, there was much religious discrimination and even persecution; but there was little under the Crown except as to holding office. The disqualification for office involved in denying the truth of the Protestant religion remained in the Constitution until the Convention of 1835.

=== New York ===
The seventeenth century Dutch Colony of New Amsterdam was in practice more tolerant than its official intolerant Protestant ethos. When the English took the province from the Dutch in 1664, they granted full religious toleration to the other forms of Protestantism, and preserved the property rights of the Dutch Reformed Church, while recognizing its discipline. The General Assembly of the province held in 1682 under the famous Governor Thomas Dongan, an Irish Catholic nobleman, adopted the Charter of Liberties, which proclaimed religious liberty to all Christians, although this charter did not receive formal royal sanction. In 1688 the Stuart Revolution in England reversed this policy of liberality, and the province of New York immediately followed the example of the mother-country in intolerance and legal persecution of the Catholic Church and its adherents. In 1697, although the Anglican Church was never formally established in the province of New York, Trinity Church was founded in the City of New York by royal charter and received many civil privileges and munificent grants of land. The Dutch Reformed Churches continued, however, to enjoy their property and the protection of their rights undisturbed by the new Anglican foundation, the inhabitants of Dutch blood being then largely in the ascendant. This condition continued many years, for when the Revolution occurred in 1776 the majority of the inhabitants of the province of New York were not of English descent.

The political conditions at home, and also the long contest between England and France for the control of North America, resulted in the enactment by the provincial legislature from time to time of proscriptive laws against the Catholics. Catholic priests and teachers were ordered to keep away from the province or, if they by any chance came there, to depart at once. Severe penalties were provided for disobedience to these laws extending to long imprisonment. In the disturbances and panic of the Slave Insurrection of 1741 schoolmaster John Ury was tried and executed for his alleged role in the uprising.

=== New Jersey ===
New Jersey was founded as a proprietary colony by grant to Lord John Berkeley and Sir George Carteret, who attracted settlers not only from England but from Scotland, New England, and particularly from Long Island and Connecticut. These planters were largely Calvinists from Presbyterian and Congregational communities, and occupied mainly land in Newark, Elizabeth, and upon the north shore of Monmouth County. The Calvinists brought with them into East Jersey their distinctive views upon religious and civil matters. East Jersey resembled New England in civil government; West Jersey resembled Virginia.

The comparative liberality of the proprietary rule of Berkeley and Carteret, especially in religious matters, attracted some Catholic settlers to New Jersey. As early as 1672 Fathers Harvey and Gage visited both Woodbridge and Elizabethtown (then the capital of New Jersey) for the purpose of ministering to the Catholics in those places. Robert Vanquellen, a native of Caen, France, and a Catholic, lived at Woodbridge, and was surveyor general of that section of New Jersey in 1669 and 1670. Catholics were, however, regarded with some suspicion, and considerable bigotry at times manifested itself. A Catholic by the name of William Douglass, when elected a representative from Bergen County, was excluded from the General Assembly of 1668 because of his religious convictions. In 1691 the New York Assembly passed the first anti-Catholic enactment, which was followed by laws strongly opposed to Catholics and their beliefs both in New York and New Jersey. Lord Cornbury, when appointed governor in 1701, was instructed by Queen Anne to permit liberty of conscience to all persons except "papists".

=== South Carolina ===
In 1670 the foundation of South Carolina was laid in a settlement on the Ashley River and a governor was appointed. In 1673 Charleston was fixed as the permanent site for the settlement, a number of Dutch immigrants from New York having arrived the year before. The colony was further augmented by Presbyterian Scotch-Irish in 1683, but the most important addition was the coming of the French Huguenots upon the revocation of the Edict of Nantes, who settled on the Cooper River, and were later admitted to the political rights of the colony. In 1697 religious liberty was accorded to all "except Papists". An attempt was made in 1704 to exclude Dissenters from the Assembly, but the law was annulled by Queen Anne. The Crown assumed control in 1721.

=== Pennsylvania ===
Pennsylvania was established in 1681 by a grant of 40,000 square miles to William Penn for services rendered to the crown by his father, Admiral Penn. Penn, a devout member of the Society of Friends, was impelled by desire to provide a safe home for persecuted Quakers. Penn was far in advance of his time in his views of the capacity of mankind for democratic government, and equally so in his broad-minded toleration of differences of religious belief. Penn's Quaker beliefs helped an attitude of toleration toward all Christian denominations spread among the population of Pennsylvania and into the colony's laws. The first Constitution of Pennsylvania adopted by the freeholders established religious liberty, but was not accepted by the Privy Council. The Frame of Government of 1701 guaranteed liberty of conscience to all who confessed and acknowledged "one Almighty God", and made eligible for office all who believed in "Jesus Christ the Savior of the World."

=== Georgia ===
James Oglethorpe, who had followed up a brilliant military career as aide-de-camp to Prince Eugene by a still more brilliant parliamentary career, had conceived the plan of settling a colony in the New World with worthy, though unfortunate and economically unproductive, inmates of the wretched English prisons. According to the colony's by-laws, freedom of worship was to be granted to all prospective colonists "except papists". In royal colonies such as Georgia, citizens were expected to belong to the Anglican Church.

== Examples of religious toleration ==
Rhode Island, under the leadership of Roger Williams allowed freedom of religion for all faiths upon its founding. Maryland was an example of religious toleration in a fairly intolerant age. The Act of Toleration, issued in 1649, was one of the first laws that explicitly defined tolerance of varieties of religion. It has been considered a precursor to the First Amendment.

== Few Catholics ==
In 1700 Maryland recorded fewer than 3,000 Catholics out of a population of 34,000 (around 9% of the population). In 1757, Pennsylvania recorded fewer than 1,400 Catholics out of a population of about 200,000. In 1790, when the newly founded United States (formerly the Thirteen Colonies) counted almost four million people in the first national census, there were fewer than 65,000 Catholics (about 1.6% of the population). John Carroll, first Catholic bishop assigned to the United States, in 1785 estimated the number of Catholics at 25,000; 15,800 in Maryland, 7,000 in Pennsylvania and 1,500 in New York. There were only 25 priests.

== Vicar Apostolic of the London District ==
Until the end of the Continental Congress or Congress of the Confederation in 1789, Catholics were under a titular bishop of the Catholic Church in England and Wales or Vicar Apostolic of the London District whose jurisdiction included the Catholics of British (English-speaking) possessions in America. The last British Catholic bishops to oversee the Catholics of the newly formed United States were Richard Challoner, 1758–81, and James Robert Talbot, 1781–90. Talbot was succeeded by the American, John Carroll, who became the first American-born Catholic bishop.

== See also ==
- Catholic Church in French Louisiana
- Catholic Church in the United States
- Catholic schools in the United States
- Catholic social activism in the United States
- Catholicism and American politics
- Ecclesiastical property in the United States
- History of Roman Catholicism in the United States
- National Museum of Catholic Art and History
- Religion in the Thirteen Colonies
