= Plundering Time =

Period of lawlessness in colonial Maryland (1644-1646)

- Part of the English Civil War and the Protestant Revolution (Maryland)
- William Claiborne, an infamous leader (along with Captain Richard Ingle) during a lawless period in the Province of Maryland
Date	1644-1646
Location	Province of Maryland
Result	With the end of hostilities, the Maryland colonial assembly issued the Maryland Toleration Act of 1649 to allow religious freedom for Catholics to worship in the colony.

Belligerents
Maryland Catholics; Maryland proprietary colonial militia	Maryland Puritans; Puritan privateers (pirates); Outlaws

Commanders and leaders
Governor Lord Baltimore; Leonard Calvert	William Claiborne; Richard Ingle

The Plundering Time (1644–1646), also known as "Claiborne and Ingle's Rebellion", was a period of civil unrest and lawlessness in the English colony of the Province of Maryland. William Claiborne and Richard Ingle took opportunities to seize property and pillage in and around Kent Island and St. Mary's City, Maryland.

== Causes of rebellion ==
The causes of the rebellion included William Claiborne's disputed claim with the Calverts over Kent Island, Maryland, bitter relations between the Catholic minority elite and the Protestant majority, and the political partisanship of the English Civil War.

The period was marked by the fall of the British King and religious intolerance, which led directly to the event.

== Kent Island dispute (1638-1644) ==
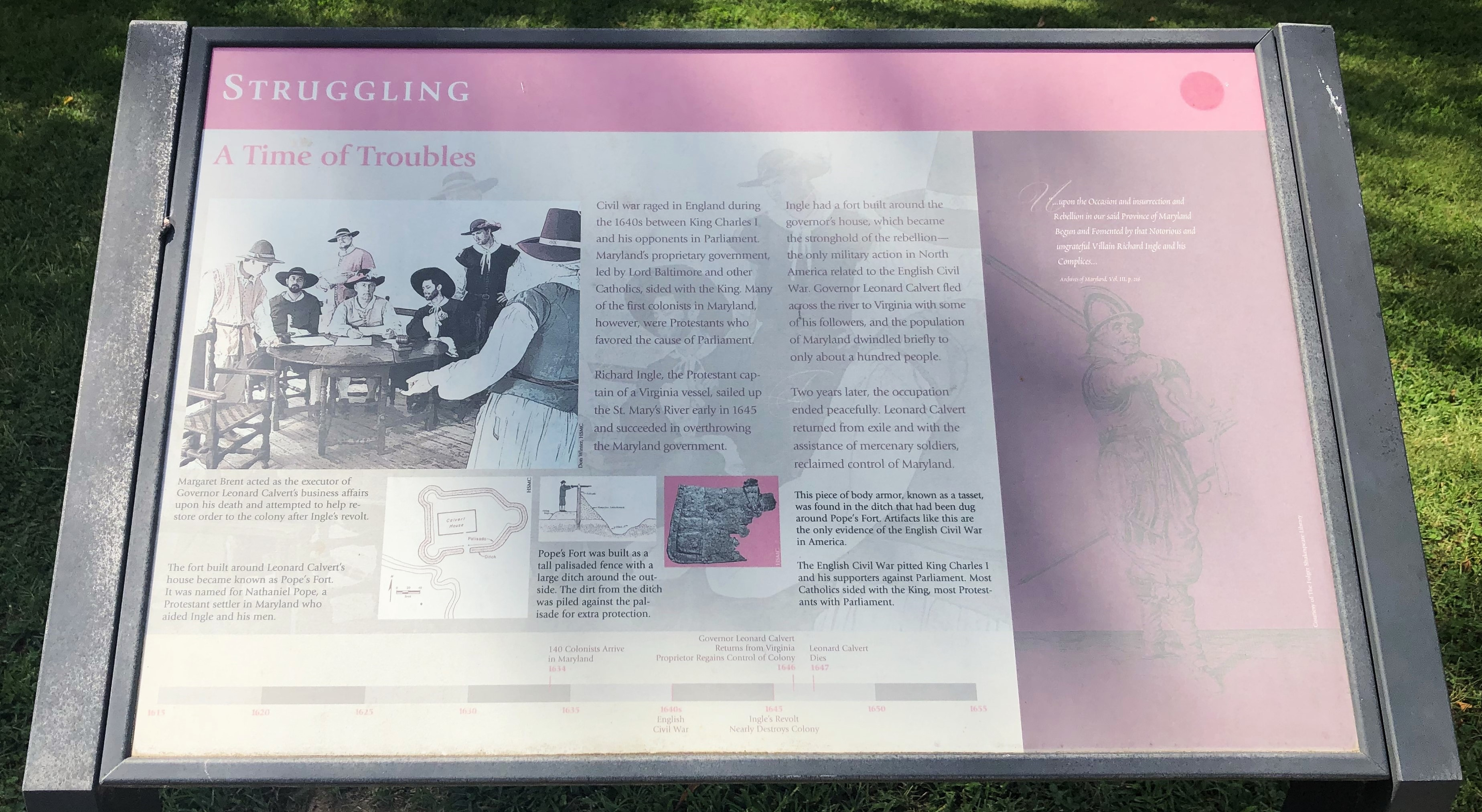
"Time of Troubles" historical marker

In the winter of 1638-1639 (O.S./N.S.), the first provincial Maryland governor Leonard Calvert seized a trading post on Kent Island established by Captain William Claiborne.

In 1644, Claiborne led an uprising of Protestants and reclaimed the Island.

== Richard Ingle's coup (1644-1646) ==
Although not officially allied, privateer Captain Richard Ingle seized the Kent Island opportunity to overthrow the government based at St. Mary's City. Catholic Governor Calvert escaped to Virginia.

Protestant pirates began plundering the property of anyone who did not swear allegiance to the English Parliament, mainly Catholics. By the end of 1646, Calvert recovered control.

== End of rebellion ==
In 1647, the Rebellion was ended by Maryland Governor Lord Baltimore, who successfully led Maryland colonial forces against the Parliamentary privateers and regained control of the colony, effectively ending the rebellion.

== Aftermath ==
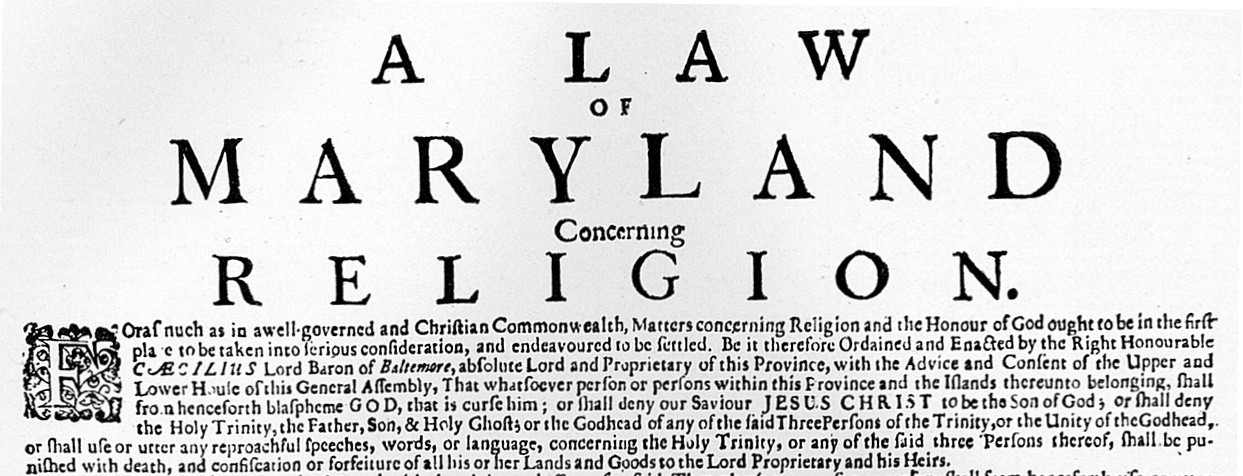
Following the end of the "Plundering Time" the Maryland colonial assembly passed the Maryland Toleration Act allowing Catholics freedom of worship in the Protestant majority colony.

The Maryland colonial assembly issued the Maryland Toleration Act of 1649 to mollify the two factions. A Parliamentary victory in England renewed old tensions leading to the 1655 Battle of the Severn, now present-day Annapolis.
