= Battle of the Severn =

1655 battle in Maryland

- Part of the Wars of the Three Kingdoms
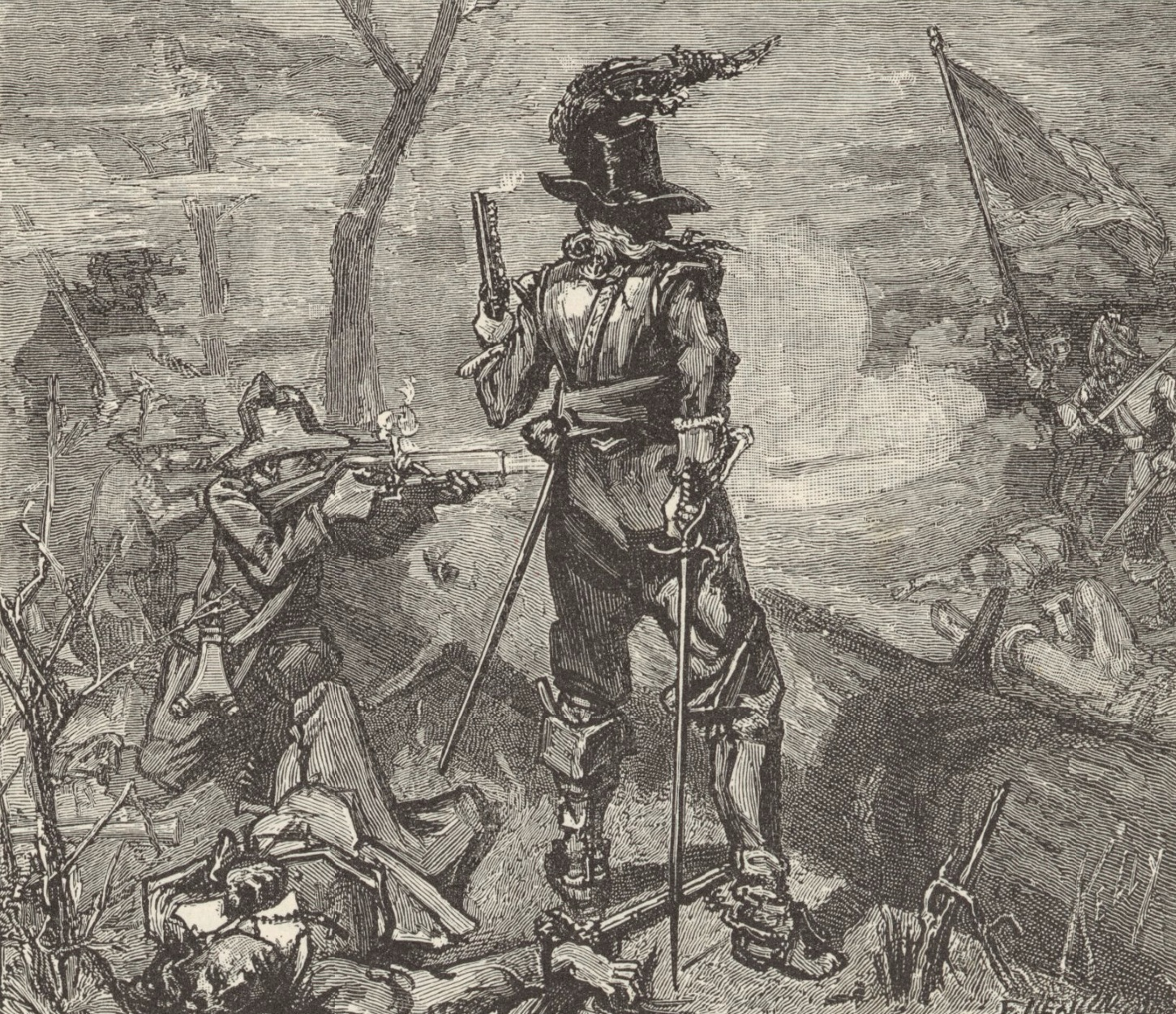
- 1876–1881 illustration of the battle
| Date | March 25, 1655 |
| Location | Annapolis, Maryland 38.998805°N 76.481867°W |
| Result | Commonwealth victory |

Belligerents
| Commonwealth supporters (primarily Puritan settlers) | Lord Baltimore's supporters (Royalist, non Puritan Protestant, and Catholic settlers) |

Commanders and leaders
| William Fuller | William Stone |

Strength
| 175 | 130 |

Casualties and losses
| 2 killed | 17 killed 32 wounded |

The Battle of the Severn was a skirmish fought on March 25, 1655, on the Severn River at Horn Point, across Spa Creek from Annapolis, Maryland, in what at that time was referred to as the Puritan settlement of "Providence", and what is now the neighborhood of Eastport. It was an extension of the conflicts that formed the English Civil War, pitting the forces of Puritan settlers against forces aligned with Lord Baltimore, then Lord Proprietor of the colony of Maryland. It has been suggested by Radmila May that this was the "last battle of the English Civil War."

== Background ==
The background surrounding the Battle of the Severn flows from the early days of Maryland as a colony, and acts as a mirror to the events simultaneously occurring in England. It pitted the forces allied with the royal proprietor, who was a Catholic and Royalist, against forces allied with the Commonwealth of England, who were Puritans.

Using the language of the charter that allowed him to take possession of land between the Delaware Bay and Potomac River "not cultivated or planted," Cecil Calvert lay claim to Kent Island.

== Royal proprietorship ==
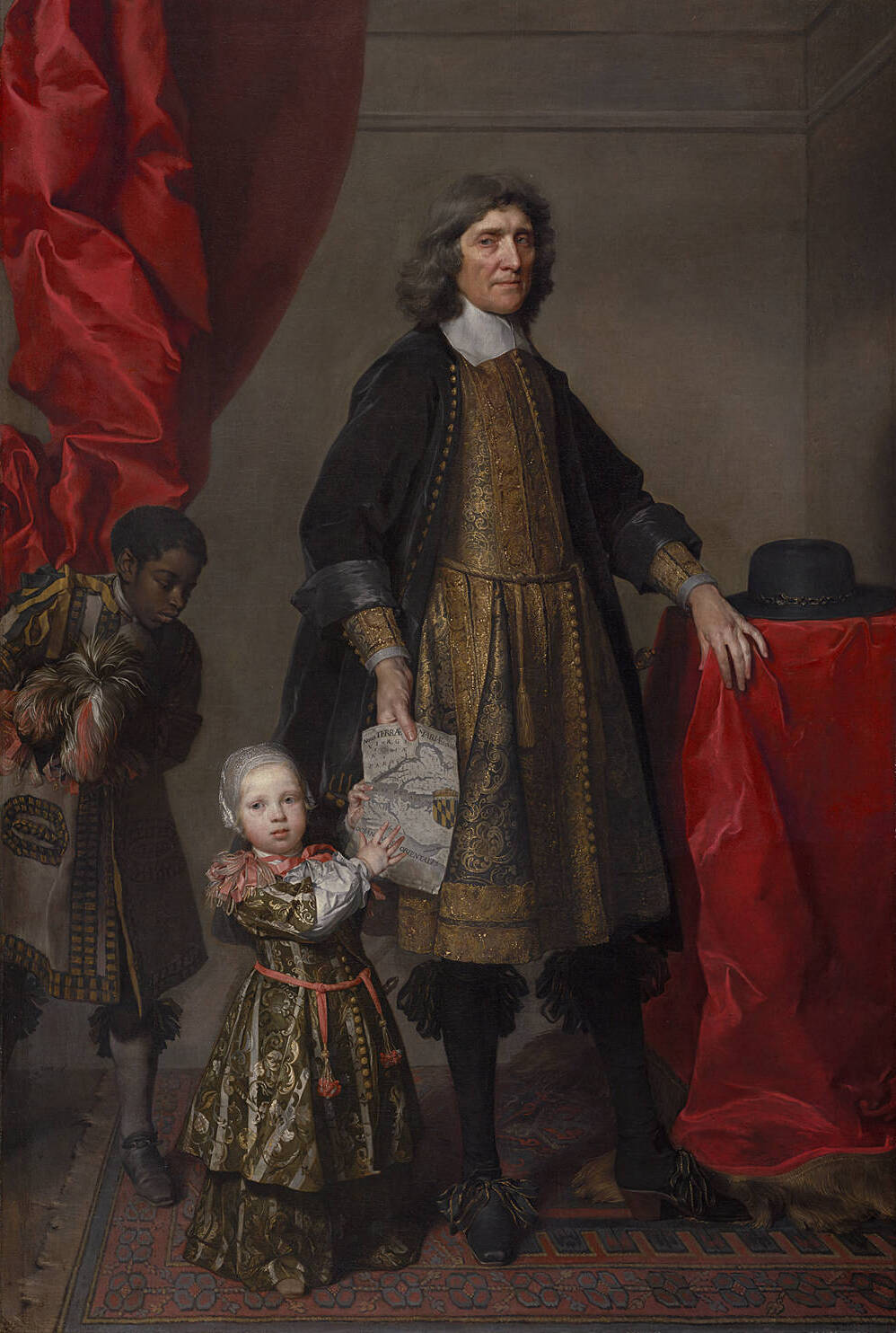
Cecil Calvert, 2nd Baron Baltimore, 1st Proprietary Governor of the Province of Maryland

Maryland was founded by the first Baron Baltimore, who had previously been the principal secretary to James I. Baltimore resigned from his position after the death of James I following his conversion to Catholicism. After a visit to what would be Maryland in 1628, Baltimore requested that Charles I make a grant of land for a colony in which Catholics could worship freely. Following Baltimore's death on June 20, 1632, the grant of land was made to Cecil Calvert, now the new Lord Baltimore.

The Charter of Maryland was unique in that it made Lord Baltimore and his heirs the "absolute Lords and Proprietaries" of the new colony. In effect, the grant created a county palatine, and, indeed, the name of Durham, a county palatine in its own right, is used in the charter. The effect of this document was to create a semi-independent colony, ruled by Lord Baltimore as Duke.

Led by Cecil Calvert’s brother, Leonard Calvert, the first settlers of the new colony, a party of Catholic gentry and Church of England Protestants, landed in present-day St. Mary's City on March 27, 1634. Using his absolute powers bestowed by charter, Cecil Calvert named his brother as royal governor of the new colony, a post he held from 1634 to 1644 and again from 1646 until his death in 1647. William Claiborne, however, had an earlier claim to Kent Island arising from 1631 when he had landed and set up a fur trading post on behalf of the colony of Virginia. Following the arrest in 1635 of one of Claiborne’s agents for trading in Maryland waters without a license, Claiborne fitted out an armed ship, and there ensued a naval battle on April 23, 1635, by the mouth of the Pocomoke River. Eventually, Leonard Calvert captured Kent Island by force in February 1638.

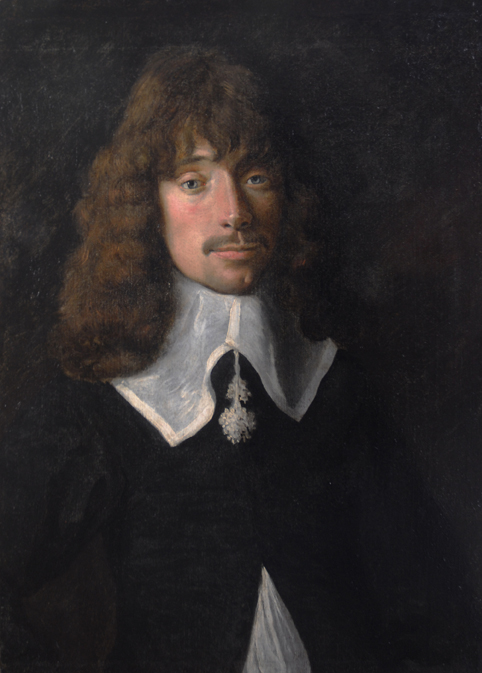
Leonard Calvert

The ensuing fallout from the capture of Kent Island would resonate through Maryland for many years to follow.

=== Plundering ===
The three part English Civil War, starting in 1642 and ending in 1651, had a direct effect on Maryland. The war itself was fought between the supporters of Charles I and the supporters of a Puritan-led English Parliament. Following the defeat and execution of Charles I, the Parliamentarians assumed power and the period is known as the English Interregnum. During this time the English monarchy was abolished, the Commonwealth of England was proclaimed, and England was ruled by Oliver Cromwell, its Lord Protector. The conflict did not finally resolve itself until 1661 with the coronation of Charles II, an act known as the English Restoration.

In April 1643, aware of the problems besetting the home-country, Leonard Calvert departed Maryland to consult with his brother Cecil Calvert, leaving Giles Brent as acting governor in his absence. During this time, St. Mary's City was visited by Captain Richard Ingle, an ardent supporter of the Parliamentary side of the conflict, who was placed under nominal arrest for making disloyal comments concerning the King, but who was allowed to escape. Upon Leonard Calvert's return, he discovered that Ingle had joined forces with Claiborne and they were planning an invasion of the colony. In September 1644, Ingle captured St. Mary's City, and Claiborne recovered Kent Island, forcing Calvert to seek refuge in Virginia.

What followed became known as the Plundering Time, a nearly two-year period when Ingle and his companions roamed the colony, robbing at will and taking Jesuits (Royalists) back to England as prisoners. This ended only in 1646 when Calvert returned from exile in Virginia, recaptured St. Mary's City, and restored the rule of loyalists to the English crown.

=== Settling of Providence ===
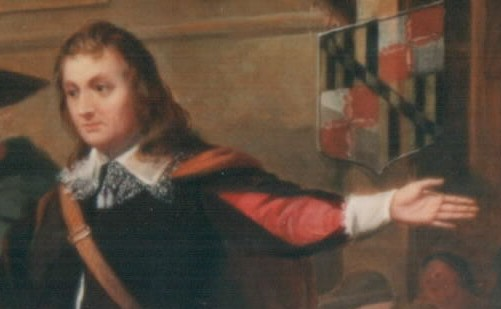
William Stone, 3rd Colonial Governor of Maryland

Following the death of Leonard Calvert in 1647, Cecil Calvert named William Stone as governor in 1649. Stone's appointment was carefully made, as he was a Protestant – as were the majority of the members of his council – and a friend of Parliament. By choosing Stone, Calvert could avoid criticism of Maryland as a seat of Popery, where Protestants were allegedly oppressed. Stone and his council, however, were required to agree not to interfere with freedom of worship. In 1649, the colonial Assembly passed the "Act Concerning Religion" (or the Toleration Act as it is more commonly known), ensuring freedom of religion within Maryland.

During the period of Parliamentary rule, Virginia remained faithful to then King Charles II, though Parliament, which had declared England a Commonwealth under their rule, had decreed that support for Charles II was treason. Baltimore and Stone stayed mute on the subject, but almost immediately after taking office, Stone allowed a group of persecuted Virginian Puritans into the colony, who then settled at Providence, present-day Annapolis. The issue of which side Maryland stood was finally settled, at least in appearance, when Thomas Greene, deputy to Stone and a Catholic, declared on November 15, 1649 that Charles II was the "undoubted rightfull heire to all his father's dominions". All acts taken by the Maryland Assembly would further require an oath of fidelity to Baltimore as "Lord Proprietor".

=== New Assembly ===
In 1651 there began a set of rumors indicating that Lord Baltimore would lose his charter. Parliament had appointed two Commissioners, one of whom was none other than Claiborne, to force Virginia to submit to Parliamentary authority. The other was Richard Bennett, who became Governor of Virginia. They interpreted Maryland to fall under this commission. In March 1652 they removed Stone as governor, only to reinstate him in June 1652. On March 2, 1654, Stone decreed that although he was faithful to the Commonwealth, all writs should "run in the Proprietary's name as heretofore". On January 3, 1654, the Puritans who had settled at Stone's invitation in Providence communicated to the commissioners that they objected to the oath of fidelity to Baltimore as a Catholic. On July 20, 1654, Stone resigned as governor under duress. The Commissioners became de facto governors of the colony, and the first general assembly under their authority was held on October 20, 1654. Catholics and any other individuals who had borne arms against the Parliament could not be members (effectively limiting the membership to Puritans), and among the 44 Acts passed by this group was a repeal of the Toleration Act, and another that forbade Catholics from practicing their faith.

=== Stone's return to power ===
On January 31, 1655, The Golden Lyon, a merchant ship commanded by Captain Roger Heamans, arrived in Maryland, and William Stone reported to the Captain that he was no longer Governor of Maryland. At about that time, another ship, The Golden Fortune arrived in the colony with a letter from Oliver Cromwell, by this time Lord Protector, addressed to Captain Stone, Governor of Maryland.

Using this as a form of recognition, William Stone challenged the authority of the commissioners, seized back the records of the colony, and mustered his troops to deal with the Puritan settlers allied with them. Recruiting from St. Mary's County, newly restored Governor Stone recaptured the Assembly records, located on the Patuxent River, and sailed with a small fleet up the Chesapeake Bay towards Providence.

== Battle of the Severn ==
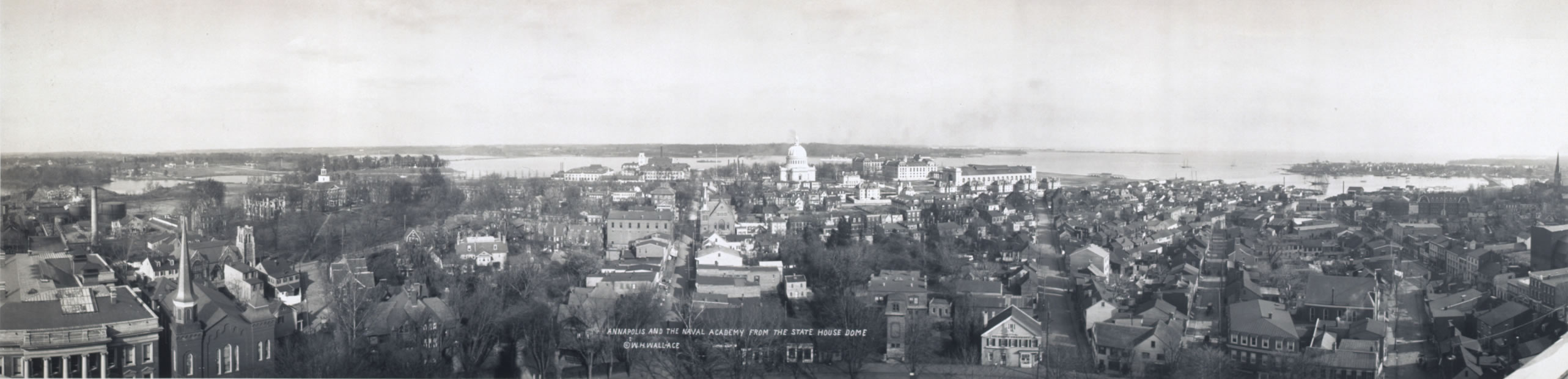
The battle was fought on Horn Point, the peninsula on the right in a panoramic view from an early photograph, in the present-day neighborhood of Eastport in Annapolis, Maryland

Heamans was informed of an alleged plot to kill the inhabitants of Providence, as well as to burn his ship and kill his crew and officers. Following the removal of the women and children of Providence to The Golden Lyon, a war council was convened and appointed William Fuller, later known as "Captain Fuller" in the coming conflict, the military leader of the Puritan settlers at Providence. On March 23, 1655, the council issued a warrant to Heamans to serve as a counselor, with Heamans relating to Stone that he was bound to do so, ignoring his contrary orders.

On March 24, 1655, Heamans fired on sloops and boats heading toward his ship, forcing their retreat. Heamans then ordered an armed sloop to bar their escape by blocking Spa Creek, the inlet of the Severn to which Stone's forces had retreated. On March 25, after Captain Fuller retrieved the only Commonwealth flag in the colony for use as his colors in battle, the forces met on Horn Point, with Fuller's forces driving Stone's small force to the end of the peninsula. In less than one half-hour, the battle was over, with 17 of Stone's forces being killed, and four executed, including Thomas Hatton, secretary of the colony. Thirty-two were wounded, including Stone. Only two of Fuller's force were killed.

Governor Stone surrendered after he was promised mercy. Following hostilities, however, the war council issued death sentences for Stone and nine others. Four of the prisoners were executed, but the remainder, including Stone, were saved when the women of Providence begged that their lives be spared.

== Aftermath ==
The primarily Puritan assembly retained powers until April 27, 1658, when proprietorship was restored to Lord Baltimore, religious freedom was ensured, and an agreement of general amnesty was entered into. Thus, in the end, Lord Baltimore not only retained his lands and powers, but was able to avoid the grisly fate of many of his contemporaries in England during this time. The proprietor appointed Josias Fendall to succeed Stone as governor for his loyalty during the battle.

The issue of the ongoing Claiborne grievance was finally settled by an agreement reached in 1657. Lord Baltimore provided Claiborne amnesty for all of his offenses, Virginia laid aside any claim it had to Maryland territory, and Claiborne was indemnified with extensive land grants in Virginia for his loss of Kent Island.

Governor Fendall soon had a falling out with Lord Baltimore and led a bloodless revolution in 1659 whereby he and Fuller reorganized Maryland's government to resemble the Commonwealth's. However, the Restoration of Charles II in 1660 forced Fendall into exile and restored the proprietorship. Fendall was replaced as governor by Phillip Calvert. In addition, Fuller's estate was confiscated and Claiborne never recovered his former holding of Kent Island.

== See also ==
- Plundering Time
- Toleration Act of 1649

== Sources ==
- Andrews, Matthew Page (1929). History of Maryland: Province and State. Garden City, New York: Doubleday. p. 718.
