= William Stone (Maryland governor) =

English-born merchant, planter and colonial administrator

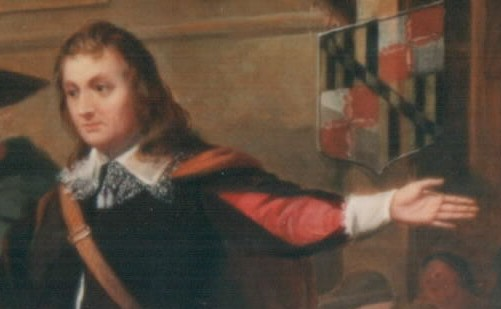
- A posthumous depiction of Stone

Proprietary governor of Maryland
- In office 1649–1656
- Preceded by: Thomas Greene
- Succeeded by: Josias Fendall

Personal details
- Born: c. 1603 Northamptonshire, England
- Died: c. 1660 Charles County, Maryland
- Spouse: Verlinda Stone
- Profession: Merchant, planter and colonial administrator

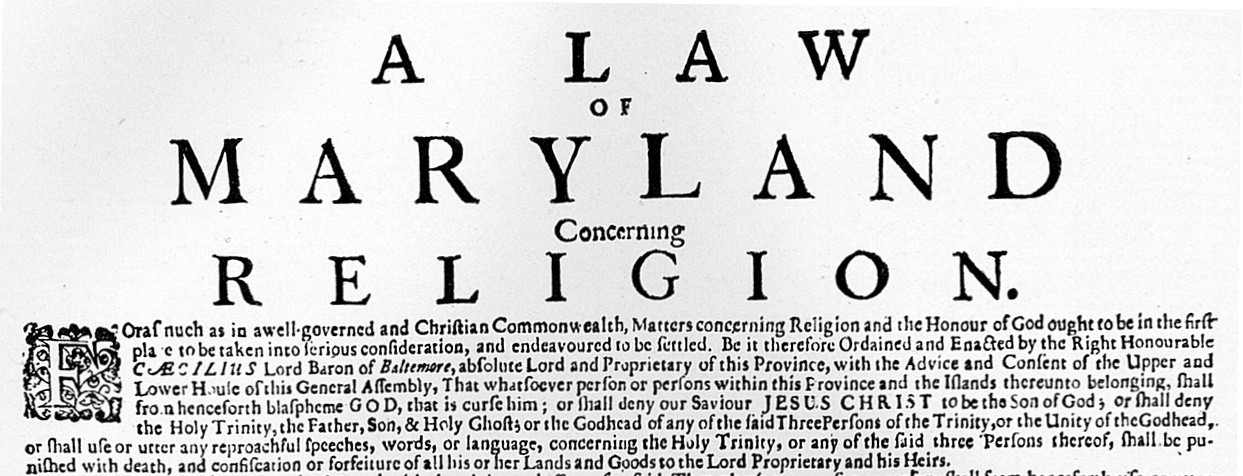
The Maryland Toleration Act, passed in 1649

William Stone (c. 1603 – c. 1660) was an English-born merchant, planter and colonial administrator who served as the proprietary governor of Maryland from 1649 to 1655.

== Early life ==
William Stone was born in Northamptonshire, England.

== Business dealings in Virginia Colony ==
Stone was one of five nephews of the wealthy traders and merchants, Thomas and Andrew Stone of London and Amsterdam, who made a fortune in the wool and tobacco trade. His brother, Captain John Stone, had a seat at Martin's Hundred by 1623, in the colony of Virginia. On September 15, 1619, William Stone set sail for the Virginia Colony, on the ship, Margaret of Bristol and was one of the new colonists, being sent to Berkeley Hundred, to work under Captain John Woodlief's supervision. Stone was supposed to serve the Society of Berkeley Hundred's investors for six years in exchange for 30 acres of land. In 1628, William Stone made his first venture into Accomac, on the Eastern Shore of Chesapeake Bay, selling a load of stockings for his haberdasher family. He began trading in other goods, livestock and tobacco. Not long after, he and his brother Andrew led a party of about 34 settlers to Accomac, stopping in Barbados on the way in a venture organized by his Uncle Thomas. Sometime, prior to February 9, 1629, he received a tobacco bill from Richard Wheeler. By June 4, 1635, William had patented 1,800 acres in Accomack.

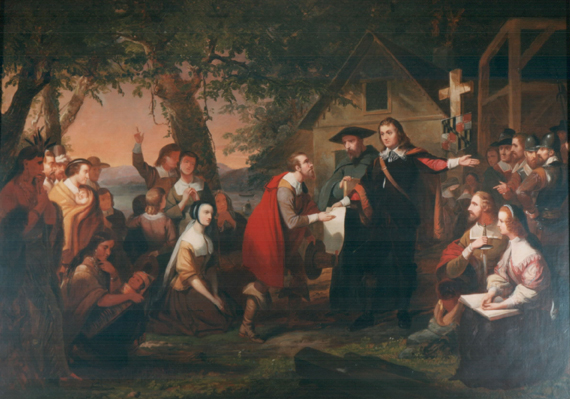
Catholic noble, Cecil Calvert, presenting the official document, of the 1649 Acts of Toleration, to the first Protestant, Maryland colonial governor, William Stone, who proclaimed religious protection, to Puritans, in the Province of Maryland

== Family, marriage, and colonial government official ==
Coat of Arms of William Stone

Local court records revealed, that he was the brother of Andrew Stone and Captain John Stone, who had been trading, on the Eastern Shore, since 1626. By 1634, William Stone had become a commissioner of the county court. Sometime, prior to February 1636, he married Verlinda Graves, the daughter of Captain Thomas Graves. William went on to become sheriff and vestryman. In 1645 he was residing on the Eastern Shore, in what had become Northampton County.

By 1648, he had become the third proprietary governor of Maryland.

== First Puritan settlement in Virginia ==
The name William Stone appears on a list of survivors of the 1622 massacre of a group of Puritans who had come to America in 1619. William became a leader of the settlement at Accomac on the Eastern Shore of Chesapeake Bay, which was loosely associated with the larger Puritan colony at Nansemond. The Virginia Puritans at first thrived, but eventually came into conflict with the conservative Royalist Anglicans who dominated Virginia.

In 1648, William Stone reached an agreement with Cecilius Calvert, the 2nd Lord Baltimore to negotiate with the Virginia Puritan colonists to resettle in the Province of Maryland.

== Governor of Province of Maryland ==
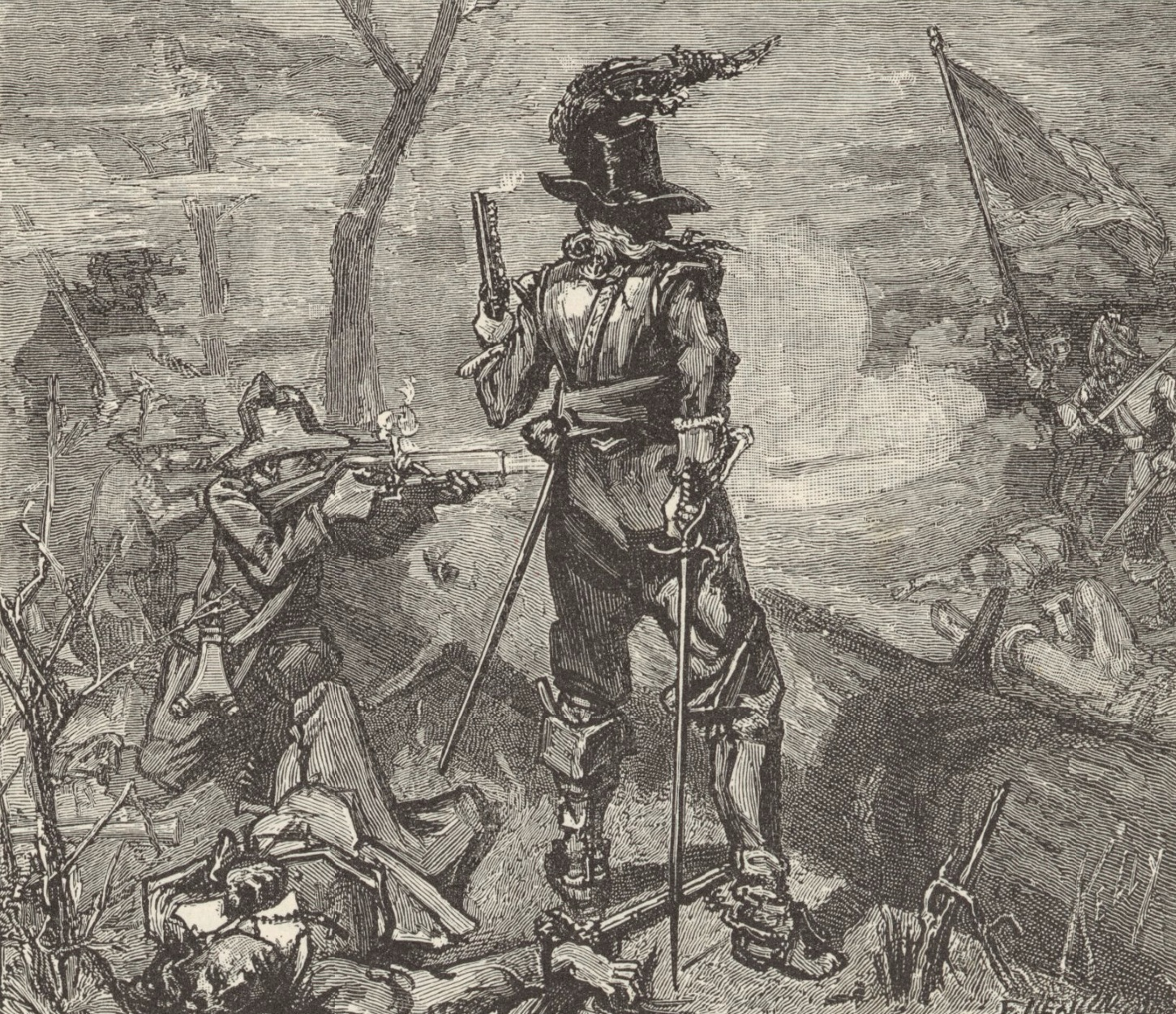
The Battle of the Severn, where Stone was injured and captured

On August 8, 1648, Lord Baltimore named Stone the Governor of his colony. He was the first Protestant Governor. The Assembly sought a confirmation of their religious liberty and in 1649 Governor Stone signed the Religious Toleration Act, which permitted liberty to all Christian denominations. In 1649, William Stone established his seat near St. Mary's City while he encouraged other Puritan exiles from Virginia to found the settlement of Providence along the north shore of the Severn River, across from the future site of the Maryland state capital of Annapolis.

In 1652, Richard Bennett and William Claiborne arrived in Virginia to take over the colonial government on behalf of the English Parliament. After Virginia surrendered on March 12, they proceeded to Maryland and briefly forced Stone from office. After Lord Baltimore's charter was confirmed by Oliver Cromwell, Stone resumed power but tensions remained between the Puritans of Providence and Stone's more moderate Protestant faction. In 1654, Stone gave up the governorship under threat from Bennett and Claiborne. Lord Baltimore ordered Stone to take back control, and Stone formed an expeditionary force the following spring to subdue Providence. But, in what is known as the Battle of the Severn (March 25, 1655), Stone's forces were defeated and he was shot through the shoulder. He was initially condemned to be hanged but the women of both sides interrupted the proceedings and he was pardoned.

William Stone was replaced as Governor by Josias Fendall (1628–87), while Bennett and Lord Baltimore reached a compromise. Stone briefly served on the Governor's Council in 1658 but thereafter took no further part in public affairs, retiring to his estate called Poynton Manor.

== Post-governor years ==
William Stone wrote his will on December 3, 1659, and it was proved in Charles County, Maryland, on December 21, 1660. Verlinda Graves Stone wrote her will, on March 3, 1674-5 and the will was proved, on July 13, 1675, in Charles County.

== Restoration, land grant, and death ==
In 1660, the monarchy in England was restored. Lord Baltimore granted William Stone as much land as he could ride, by horseback, in a day, as a reward for Stone's faithful service. Stone concentrated on developing his plantation at Poynton Manor in what is now Charles County, Maryland, where he died in about 1660.

== Legacy ==
Stone's great-grandson, David (born 1709), greatly expanded the value of the estate at Poynton and returned the family to prominence. William Stone's great-great-grandsons made major contributions to the foundation of Maryland as an American state: Thomas Stone signed the Declaration of Independence, Michael Jenifer Stone represented Maryland in the First United States Congress, John Hoskins Stone was Governor of Maryland 1794–97, and William Murray Stone was the Episcopal Bishop of Baltimore. A great-great-great-grandson, Barton W. Stone, was a prominent early leader of the Restoration Movement.

== See also ==
- List of colonial governors of Maryland
- Proprietary Governor
- Province of Maryland
- English Interregnum
- English Civil War
- The Protectorate
