= Richard Ingle =

English rebel and privateer in colonial Maryland (c. 1609 – 1653)

Captain Richard Ingle
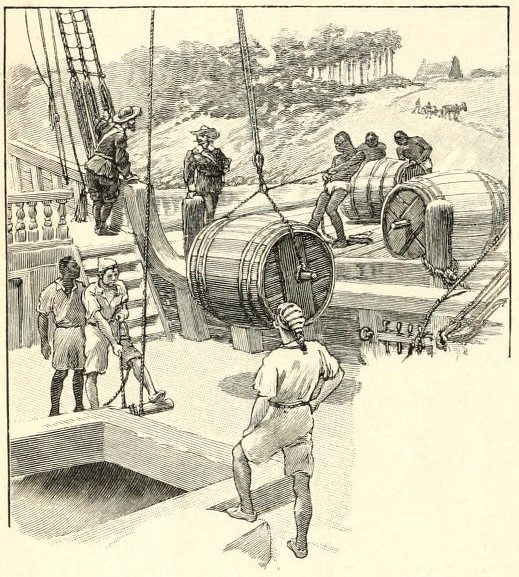
- Illustration of a tobacco ship, circa 1620
- Born: c. 1609; Kingdom of England
- Other names: Mr. Inglee, "Jugle"
- Occupations: sea captain, tobacco trader, privateer
- Known for: Making war with the Catholic colonial Governor Lord Baltimore and Catholics in the Province of Maryland in the name of English Parliament and the Maryland Puritans, plundering ships and attacking and seizing the colonial capital of St. Mary's City
- Opponents: Catholic colonial Governor Lord Baltimore; Catholics in Province of Maryland
- Piratical career
- Allegiance: Commonwealth of England; Commonwealth Parliamentary Navy
- Rank: Captain
- Commands: Reformation (1645)
- Battles/wars: Plundering Time (1644–1646) Capture of St. Mary's City, Province of Maryland (1645)

Richard Ingle (b. c. 1609 – d. 1653) was an English sea captain, tobacco trader, and privateer in colonial Maryland. Along with William Claiborne, Ingle revolted against Maryland Catholic leaders in the name of English Parliament and Puritans in a period known as the Plundering Time. Ingle and his men attacked ships and captured the colonial capital of the proprietary government in St. Mary's City.

== Early life ==
Richard Ingle was born in England, possibly in London, into a Protestant family that schooled him. He became a trader and ship captain, transporting the goods of Maryland colonial traders from England and back, and later became a prominent trader of tobacco around Virginia. Ingle's name appears in records in 1642, when he arrived in Boston captaining the Eleanor with a shipment of tobacco from Virginia.

== Ingle's Revolt ==
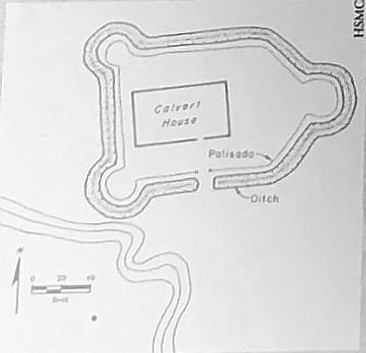
Pope's Fort palisade and the Leonard Calvert House, St. Mary's County, Maryland, c. 1645

When the English Civil War broke out in the early 1640s, Ingle sided with the Puritans. He fell out with the Catholic leaders of the province of Maryland. Royalist proprietary governor Leonard Calvert seized his ship, but Ingle escaped.

In January 1643/4, Ingle was reported as part owner and master of the trading ship, Reformation. A warrant for his arrest from William Hardrige was made to be carried out by Thomas Cornwallis. With Captain and Councilor James Neale, Cornwallis arrested Richard Ingle but then switched to allow Ingle to sail away. Both Neale and Cornwallis were only fined and suspended for their transgression.

Ingle returned in February 1645/46 (O.S./N.S.) with the ship Reformation. Ingle captured the Dutch ship, Spiegel, which contained Calvert and acting governor Giles Brent. Ingle and his crew assailed the Maryland colony in the name of English Parliament. Ingle attacked the St. Mary's City, the colonial capital, and imprisoned leaders of the colony. Governor Calvert fled to Virginia. Ingle's men built a palisade around Leonard Calvert's property and named it "Pope's Fort" in tribute to Colonel Nathaniel Pope, the owner of the Calvert property.

=== Plundering Time ===
Captain Richard Ingle took control of the Maryland colonial government and along with fellow Protestant William Claiborne, an Anglican church adherent, ushered in a period of unrest and lawlessness from 1644 to 1646 known as the "Claiborne and Ingle's rebellion", or "Plundering Time". Under Ingle's leadership, his men looted property of wealthy Roman Catholic settlers. Ingle claimed that he had a letter of marque to cruise the waters of Shesapeake (Chesapeake Bay) by permission of the new Long Parliament in England. Local settlers regarded him as a pirate. Ingle had a council mimicking the previous governing body, called the Assembly of Protestants. He put two Jesuit priests, Andrew White and Thomas Copley, in chains and transported them back to England.

Governor Calvert returned in August 1646 with a military force and re-established his control of the colony. Calvert died in June 1647 due to illness. In 1648, Richard Ingle was called a "notorious and ungrateful villain" by Maryland leaders. Ingle was forced to pay for damages done to property in Maryland, which financially ruined him.

== Death ==
Though most of his men were granted amnesty, Richard Ingle, according to some sources, was specifically exempted from being released, made an example of, and executed as a pirate in 1653.
