= Maryland Toleration Act =

1649 religious tolerance act in the Maryland Colony

Toleration Act
- Part of English Civil War and Protestant Revolution of Maryland
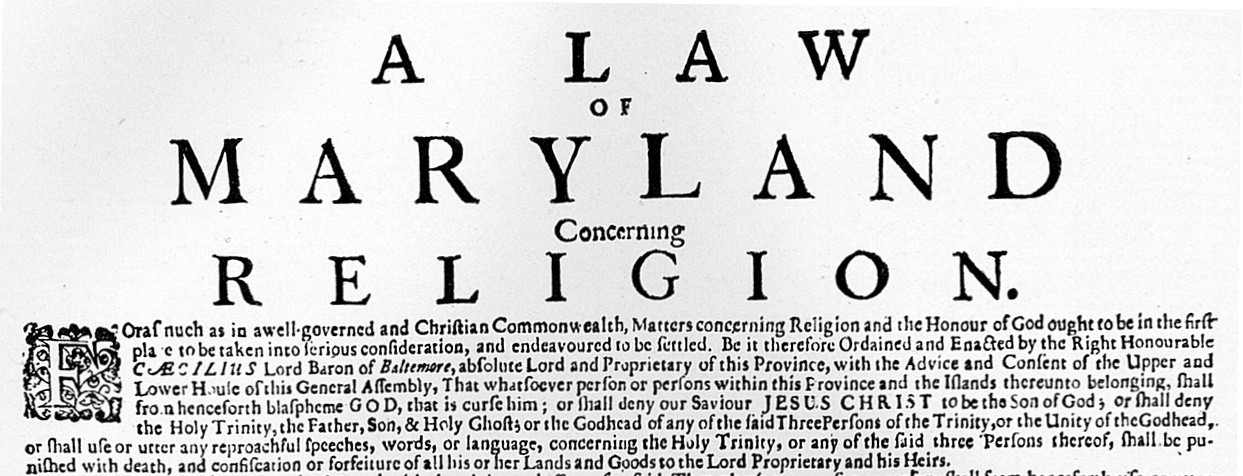
- A small broadside reprint of the Maryland Toleration Act
- Date: April 21, 1649
- Location: Maryland Colony
- Also known as: Act Concerning Religion
- Participants: Colonial Assembly of Maryland
- Outcome: Repealed in October 1654

The Maryland Toleration Act, also known as the Act Concerning Religion, was the first law in North America requiring religious tolerance for Christians. It was passed on April 21, 1649, by the assembly of the Colony of Maryland, in St. Mary's City in St. Mary's County, Maryland. It created one of the pioneer statutes passed by the legislative body of an organized colonial government to guarantee any degree of religious liberty. Specifically, the bill, now usually referred to as the Toleration Act, granted freedom of conscience to all Christians. (The colony which became Rhode Island passed a series of laws, the first in 1636, which prohibited religious persecution including against non-Trinitarians; Rhode Island was also the first government to separate church and state.) Historians argue that it helped inspire later legal protections for freedom of religion in the United States. The Calvert family, who founded Maryland partly as a refuge for English Catholics, sought enactment of the law to protect Catholic settlers and those of other religions that did not conform to the dominant Anglicanism of Britain and her colonies.

The Act allowed freedom of worship for all Trinitarian Christians in Maryland, but sentenced to death anyone who denied the divinity of Jesus. It was revoked in 1654 by William Claiborne, a Virginian who had been appointed as a commissioner by Oliver Cromwell; he was an Anglican, a Puritan sympathizer, and strongly hostile to the Catholic Religion. When the Calverts regained control of Maryland, the Act was reinstated, before being repealed permanently in 1692 following the events of the Glorious Revolution, and the Protestant Revolution in Maryland. As the first law on religious tolerance in British North America, it influenced related laws in other colonies and portions of it were echoed in the writing of the First Amendment to the United States Constitution, which enshrined religious freedom in American law.

== Cecil Calvert ==
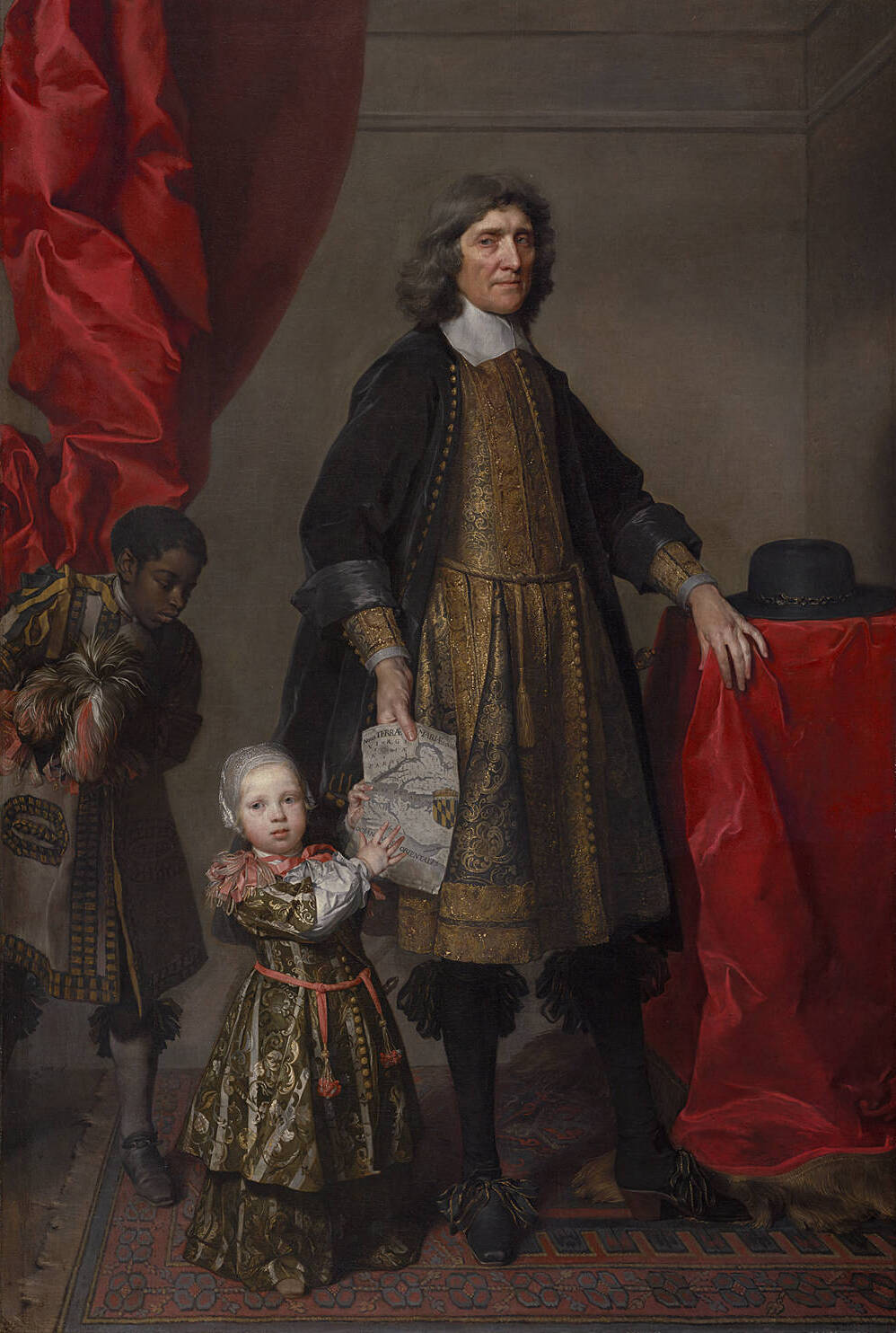
A painting of Cecil Calvert, 2nd Baron Baltimore.

The Province of Maryland was founded by Cecil Calvert, 2nd Baron Baltimore in 1634. Like his father George Calvert, 1st Baron Baltimore, who had originated the efforts that led to the colony's charter, he was Catholic at a time when the Kingdom of England was dominated by the Church of England. The Calverts intended the colony to function both as a haven for English Catholics fleeing religious persecution and as a source of income for themselves and their descendants. Many of Maryland's first settlers were Catholic, including at least two Catholic priests, one of whom became the earliest chronicler of the colony's history. But whatever Calvert's intentions, Maryland was a colony of an Anglican nation. Its charter had been granted by an Anglican king and seems to have assumed that the Church of England would be its official church. Eventually, Anglican and Puritan newcomers quickly came to outnumber the early Catholic settlers. Thus, by 1649 when the law was passed, the colonial assembly was dominated by Protestants, and the law was in effect an act of Protestant tolerance for Catholics, rather than the reverse.

From Maryland's earliest days, Cecil Calvert had enjoined its colonists to leave religious rivalries behind. Along with giving instructions on the establishment and defense of the colony, he asked the men he appointed to lead it to ensure peace between Protestants and Catholics. He also asked the Catholics to practice their faith as privately as possible, so as not to disturb that peace. The Ordinance of 1639, Maryland's earliest comprehensive law, expressed a general commitment to the rights of man, but did not specifically detail protections for religious minorities of any kind. Peace prevailed until the English Civil War, which opened religious rifts and threatened Calvert's control of Maryland. In 1647, after the death of Governor Leonard Calvert, Protestants seized control of the colony. Cecil Calvert, 2nd Baron Baltimore, quickly regained power, but recognized that religious tolerance not specifically enshrined in law was vulnerable. This recognition was combined with the arrival of a group of Puritans whom Calvert had induced to establish Providence, now Annapolis, by guaranteeing their freedom of worship. Partially to confirm the promises he made to them, Calvert wrote the Maryland Toleration Act and encouraged the colonial assembly to pass it. They did so on April 21, 1649.

== Description ==
The Maryland Toleration Act was an act of tolerance, allowing specific religious groups to practice their religion without being punished, but retaining the ability to revoke that right at any time. It also granted tolerance to only Christians who believed in the Trinity. The law was very explicit in limiting its effects to Christians:

... no person or persons ... professing to believe in Jesus Christ, shall from henceforth be anyways troubled, Molested or discountenanced for or in respect of his or her religion nor in the free exercise thereof within this Province ...

— Maryland Toleration Act, 1649

Settlers who blasphemed by denying the Trinity or the divinity of Jesus Christ could be punished by execution or the seizure of their lands. That meant that Jews, Unitarians, and other dissenters from Trinitarian Christianity who practiced their religions risked their lives. Any person who insulted the Virgin Mary, the apostles, or the evangelists could be whipped, jailed, or fined. Otherwise, Trinitarian Christians' right to worship was protected. The law outlawed the use of "heretic" and other religious insults against them.

The law was used in at least one attempt to prosecute a non-Christian. In 1658, a Jew named Jacob Lumbrozo was accused of blasphemy after saying that Jesus was not the son of God and that the miracles described in the New Testament were conjuring tricks. Lumbrozo did not deny having said such things but argued that he had only responded to questions asked of him. He was held for trial, but the case was later dismissed, and he was given full citizenship as a condition of the restoration of Calvert's rule following the English Civil War.

The law had its detractors, even among those groups protected by it. Puritans were concerned that the act and the proprietary government in general were royalist. They were also concerned that by swearing allegiance to Calvert, who was Catholic, they were being required to submit to the Pope, whom they considered to be the Antichrist. Some Anglicans also opposed the law, believing that the Church of England should be the colony's sole established church.

== Repeal and legacy ==
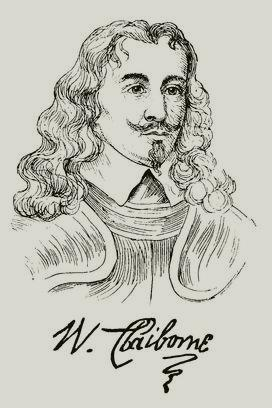
William Claiborne, who rescinded the Toleration Act when he took over the colony during the reign of Oliver Cromwell

In 1654, five years after its passage, the Act was repealed. Two years earlier the colony had been seized by Protestants following the execution of King Charles I of England and the outbreak of the English Civil War. In the early stages of that conflict, the colonial assembly of Maryland and its neighbors in Virginia had publicly declared their support for the King. Parliament appointed Protestant commissioners loyal to their cause to subdue the colonies, and two of them, the Virginian William Claiborne and Puritan leader Richard Bennett, took control of the colonial government in St. Mary's City in 1652. In addition to repealing the Maryland Toleration Act with the assistance of Protestant assemblymen, Claiborne and Bennett passed a new law barring Catholics from openly practicing their religion. Calvert regained control after making a deal with the colony's Protestants, and in 1657 the Act was again passed by the colonial assembly and remained in effect until 1692.

Following the Glorious Revolution of 1688 in England, when the Catholic King James II of England was deposed and the Protestant William III ascended the throne, a rebellion of Maryland Puritan Protestants overthrew Calvert's rule. They quickly rescinded the Toleration Act and banned public practice of Catholicism, and it would never be reinstated under colonial rule. In fact, the colony established the Church of England as its official church in 1702 and explicitly barred Catholics from voting in 1718. The Calvert family regained control over the colony in 1715, but only after Benedict Calvert converted to Protestantism. His political control remained tense enough that he did not risk an attempt to reinstate protections for Catholics. It took until the era of the American Revolution for religious tolerance or freedom to again become the practice in Maryland.

While the law did not secure religious freedom, and while it included severe limitations, it was nonetheless a significant milestone. It predates the Enlightenment, which is generally considered to be when the idea of religious freedom took root, and stands as the first legal guarantee of religious tolerance in American and British history. Later laws ensuring religious tolerance and freedom, including the British Act of Toleration of 1689, the Holy Experiment in Pennsylvania, and laws concerning religion in other colonies such as South Carolina, may have been influenced by its example. According to historian Robert Brugger, "...the measure marked a notable departure from Old World oppression." It was not until the passage of the signed First Amendment to the Constitution over a century later that religious freedom was enshrined as a fundamental guarantee, but even that document echoes the Toleration Act in its use of the phrase, "free exercise thereof". Thus, despite its lack of a full guarantee of religious freedom or broad-based tolerance, the law is "a significant step forward in the struggle for religious liberty."

== See also ==
- History of religion in the United States
