= Governor Calvert =

Governor Calvert may refer to:

- Benedict Calvert, 4th Baron Baltimore (1679–1715), 10th Proprietary-Governor of Maryland from 1684 to 1688
- Benedict Leonard Calvert (1700–1732), 15th Proprietary Governor of Maryland from 1727 to 1731
- Cecil Calvert, 2nd Baron Baltimore (1605–1675), Governor of Newfoundland (Avalon) from 1629 to 1632
- Charles Calvert (governor) (1688–1734), 14th Proprietary-Governor of Maryland from 1720 to 1727
- Charles Calvert, 3rd Baron Baltimore (1637–1715), 6th and 9th Proprietary-Governor of Maryland from 1661 to 1676 and from 1679 to 1684
- Charles Calvert, 5th Baron Baltimore (1699–1751), 17th Proprietary Governor of the province of Maryland from 1732 to 1733
- George Calvert, 1st Baron Baltimore (1580–1632), Proprietary Governor of Newfoundland from 1627 to 1629
- Leonard Calvert (1606–1647), 1st Proprietary-Governor of the province of Maryland from 1634 to 1647
- Phillip Calvert (governor) (1626–1682), Governor of Maryland in 1660 or 1661
