= Charlotte Lee, Lady Baltimore =

English noblewoman (1678–1721)

The Right Honourable The Lady Baltimore
- Born: 13 March 1678 (Old Style); 23 March 1678 (New Style); St. James's Park, St. James, London, England
- Died: 22 January 1721 (Old Style); 1 February 1721 (New Style); Woodford Hall, Woodford, Essex, England
- Noble family: Lee
- Spouses: Benedict Leonard Calvert, 4th Baron Baltimore; Christopher Crowe
- Issue: Charles Calvert, 5th Baron Baltimore; Hon. Benedict Leonard Calvert, Governor of Maryland; Hon. Edward Henry Calvert; Hon. Charlotte Calvert; Hon. Jane Calvert; Hon. Cecil Calvert; Christopher Crowe; Catherine Crowe; Charlotte Crowe; George Crowe
- Father: Edward Henry Lee, 1st Earl of Lichfield
- Mother: Lady Charlotte Fitzroy

Charlotte Lee, Lady Baltimore (23 March 1678, (13 March 1678 OS) – 1 February 1721, (22 January 1721 OS), was an English noblewoman, and granddaughter of King Charles II of England and his mistress Barbara Villiers. She married in 1699, Benedict Leonard Calvert, 4th Baron Baltimore, from whom she separated in 1705; she later married Christopher Crowe. She was the mother of Charles Calvert, 5th Baron Baltimore, and of Benedict Leonard Calvert, who was Governor of Maryland from 1727 to 1731.

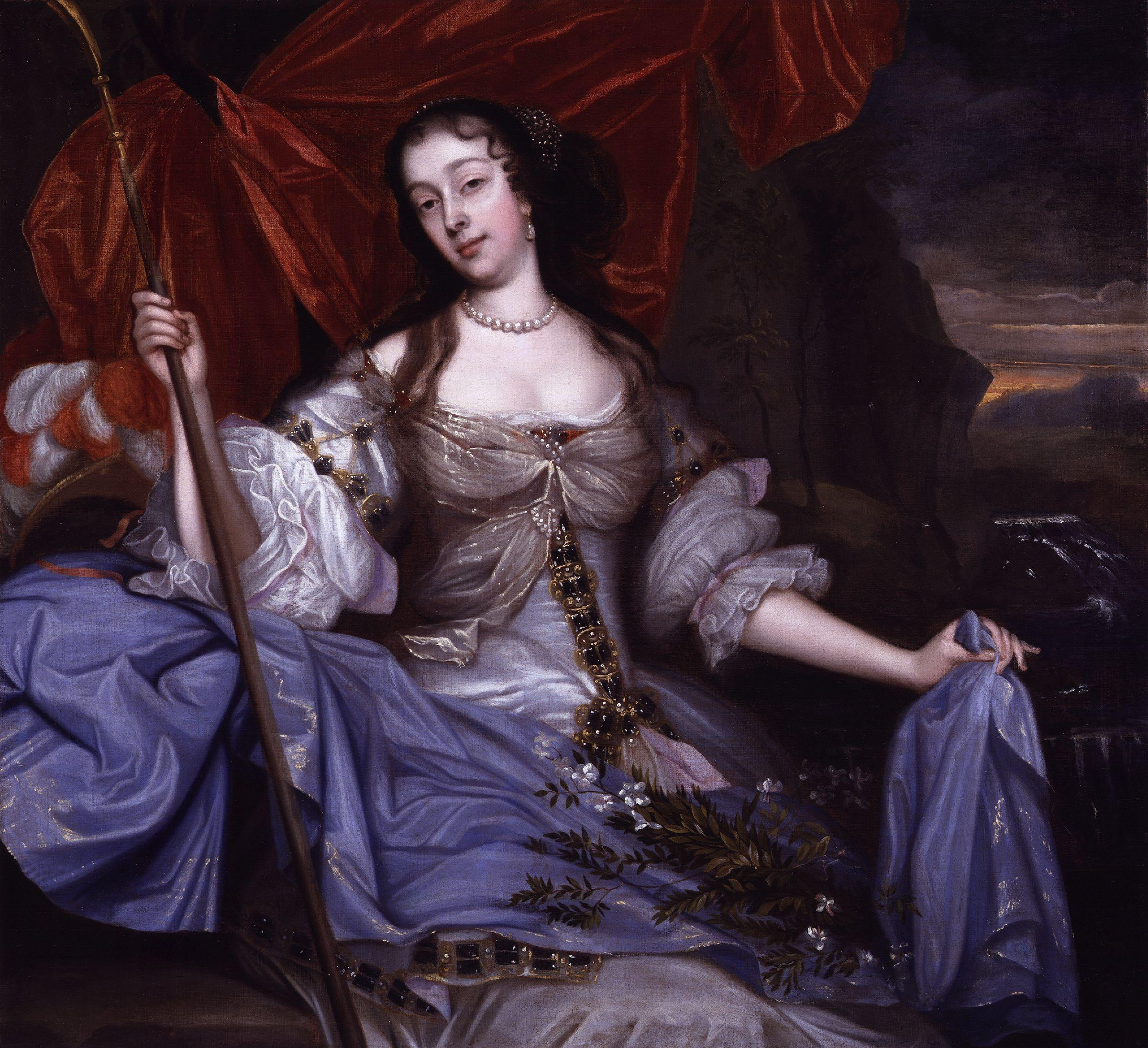
Charlotte Lee was the granddaughter of King Charles II of England and his mistress Barbara Villiers, whose portrait is seen here

== Early life ==
Lady Charlotte Lee was born on 13 March 1678 at St. James's Park, St. James, London. She was the eldest of at least fourteen children of Edward Henry Lee, 1st Earl of Lichfield and Lady Charlotte Fitzroy, illegitimate daughter of King Charles II by his mistress Barbara Villiers, Countess of Castlemaine, Duchess of Cleveland.

Lady Charlotte's mother was thirteen years old at the time of her birth, having married the Earl of Lichfield at the age of twelve. Her father was also only fifteen at the time of her birth.

Her paternal grandparents were Sir Francis Henry Lee of Ditchley, 4th Baronet of Quarendon and Elizabeth Pope, daughter of Thomas Pope, 2nd Earl of Downe.

== Marriage to Lord Baltimore ==
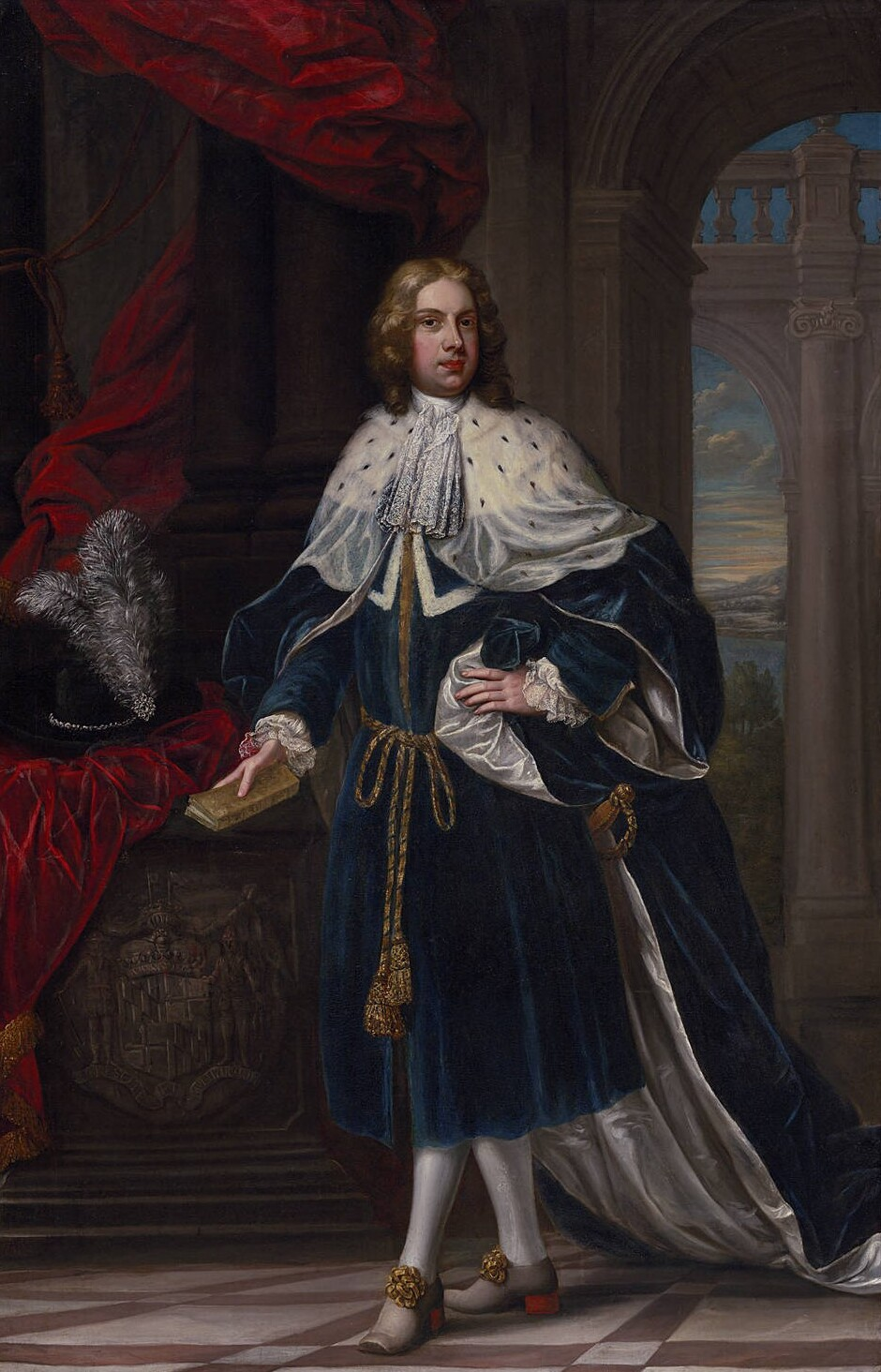
Charlotte Lee's first husband, Benedict Calvert, 4th Baron Baltimore

On 2 January 1699, at the age of twenty, she married her first husband Benedict Calvert, son of Charles Calvert, 3rd Baron Baltimore and Jane Lowe.

Charlotte assumed the title of Lady Baltimore in February 1715, when her husband succeeded to the title of 4th Baron Baltimore upon the death of his father, the third Baron Baltimore. The title of Proprietary Governor of the Province of Maryland had been lost to the third Baron during the Glorious Revolution and would be restored to Charles Calvert, the son of Charlotte and Benedict, upon the latter's death on 16 April 1715.

Charlotte and Lord Baltimore had six children:

- Charles Calvert, 5th Baron Baltimore, 18th Proprietor Governor of Maryland, FRS (29 September 1699 – 24 April 1751), married Mary Janssen, daughter of Sir Theodore Janssen, 1st Baronet Janssen and Williamsa Henley, with whom he had three children, including Frederick Calvert, 6th Baron Baltimore, Louisa Calvert, and Caroline Calvert. He also had an illegitimate son, by the name of Benedict Swingate Calvert, who settled in Maryland, and married his cousin Elizabeth Calvert.
- Hon. Benedict Leonard Calvert, Governor of Maryland, (1700–1731). He died 1 June 1732 on his passage home to England.
- Hon. Edward Henry Calvert (born ca. 1700), held the office of Commissary General and President of the council of Maryland.
- Hon. Charlotte Calvert (died December 1744), married Thomas Breerwood, with whom she had a son, Francis Breerwood.
- Hon. Jane Calvert (died July 1778), married John Hyde, with whom she had three children.
- Hon. Cecil Calvert (born 1702)

Charlotte and Lord Baltimore were separated in 1705. In 1706 Charlotte had an affair with Colonel Robert Fielding, then the bigamous husband of her grandmother the Duchess of Cleveland, and was rumoured to have borne a child by him, born on 23 April 1707.

In 1711, Lord Baltimore brought a Bill before the House of Lords (which adjudicated on matters of inheritance of titles and estates) to confirm his divorce from Lady Charlotte, their financial settlement, and that any subsequent children she bore would be declared illegitimate.

== Marriage to Christopher Crowe ==
Lady Baltimore married her second husband Christopher Crowe (c.1681 – 9 November 1749), Consul at Leghorn, on 13 August 1715. This marriage produced four more children:

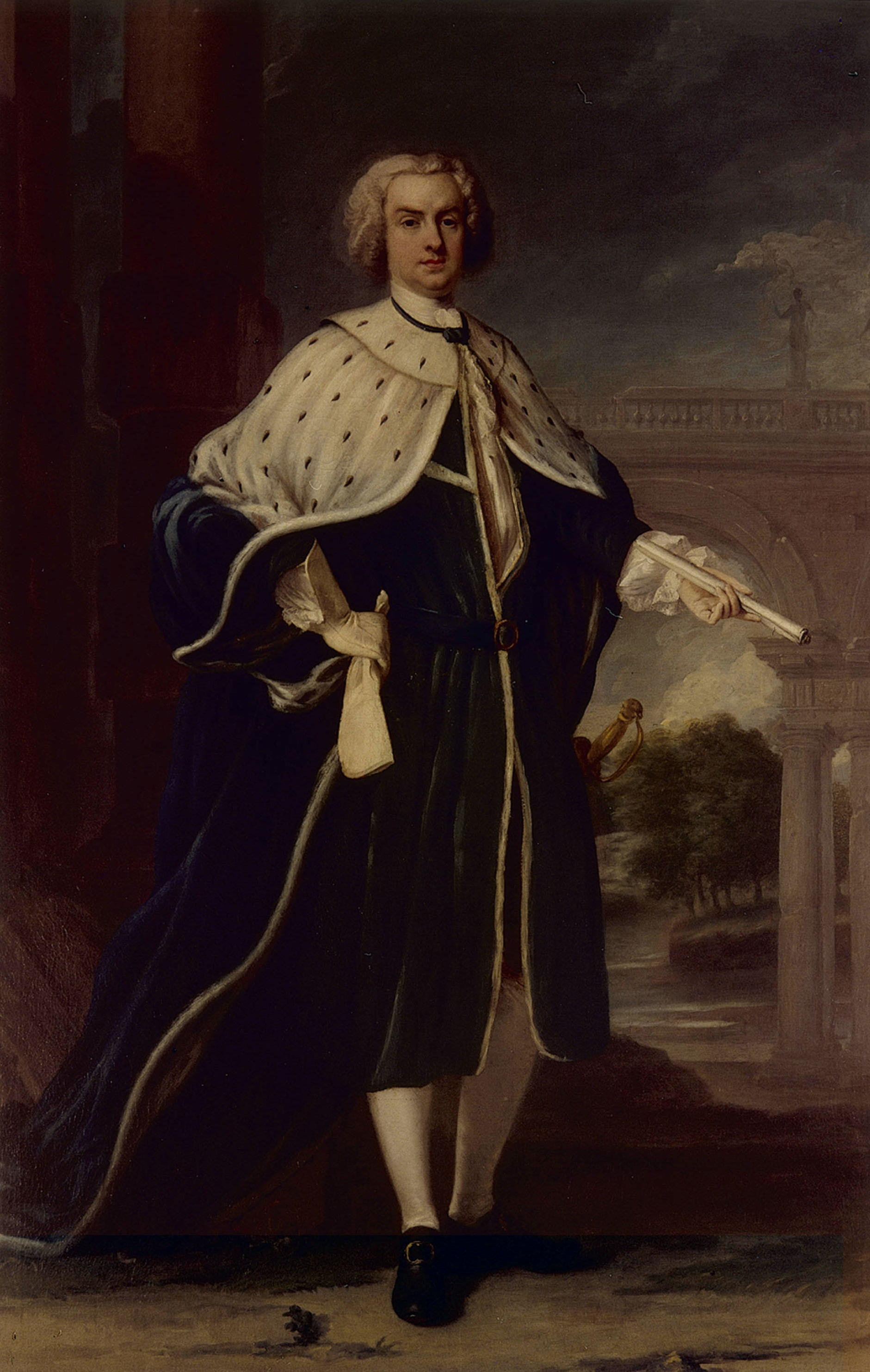
Charles Calvert, 5th Baron Baltimore, was the eldest son of Charlotte Lee and her first husband, Benedict Leonard Calvert, 4th Baron Baltimore

- Christopher Crowe (1716–1776), married Barbara Duncombe
- Catherine Crowe (1717 – 1782), married Roger Henry Gale
- Charlotte Crowe (1718–1742)
- George Crowe (25 November 1719 – 10 October 1782), married Anne Swift, by whom he had a son, Robert.

== Death and legacy ==
Charlotte Lee died on 22 January 1721 at Woodford Hall, Woodford, Essex. She was buried at Woodford on 29 January 1721. She died intestate and her estate was administered on 4 March 1721 at Woodford Hall.

== In fiction ==
Charlotte Lee appears as a minor character in Anya Seton's historical romance Devil Water.

== Ancestry ==
Ancestors of Charlotte Lee, Lady Baltimore

Sir Henry Lee, 1st Baronet
Francis Henry Lee, 2nd Baronet
Eleanor Wortley
Sir Francis Henry Lee, 4th Baronet of Quarendon
Sir John St. John, 1st Baronet
Anne St. John
Anne Leighton
Edward Henry Lee, 1st Earl of Lichfield
Sir William Pope
Thomas Pope, 2nd Earl of Downe
Elizabeth Watson
Elizabeth Pope
John Dutton
Lucy Dutton
Elizabeth Baynton
Charlotte Lee
James I of England
Charles I of England
Anne of Denmark
Charles II of England
Henri IV of France
Henrietta Maria of France
Marie de Medici
Lady Charlotte Fitzroy
Sir Edward Villiers
William Villiers, 2nd Viscount Grandison
Barbara St. John
Barbara Villiers, 1st Duchess of Cleveland
Paul Bayning, 1st Viscount Bayning
Mary Bayning
Anne Glemham

== Sources ==
- G.E. Cokayne, The Complete Peerage of England, Scotland, Ireland, Great Britain and the United Kingdom, Extanct, Extinct or Dormant, new ed., 13 volumes in 14 (1910–1959)
- Antonia Fraser, King Charles II, Weidenfeld and Nicolson Ltd., London, 1979
- Antonia Fraser, King Charles II, p. 414
