= Benedict Calvert =

Benedict Calvert may refer to:

- Benedict Calvert, 4th Baron Baltimore (1679–1715), English nobleman and politician
- Benedict Leonard Calvert (1700–1732), proprietary governor of Maryland
- Benedict Swingate Calvert (1722–1788), planter, politician and Loyalist in Maryland during the American Revolution

== See also ==
- Charles Benedict Calvert (1808–1864), U.S. Representative from Maryland
