= Elizabeth Calvert =

Heiress in colonial Maryland (1731–1788)

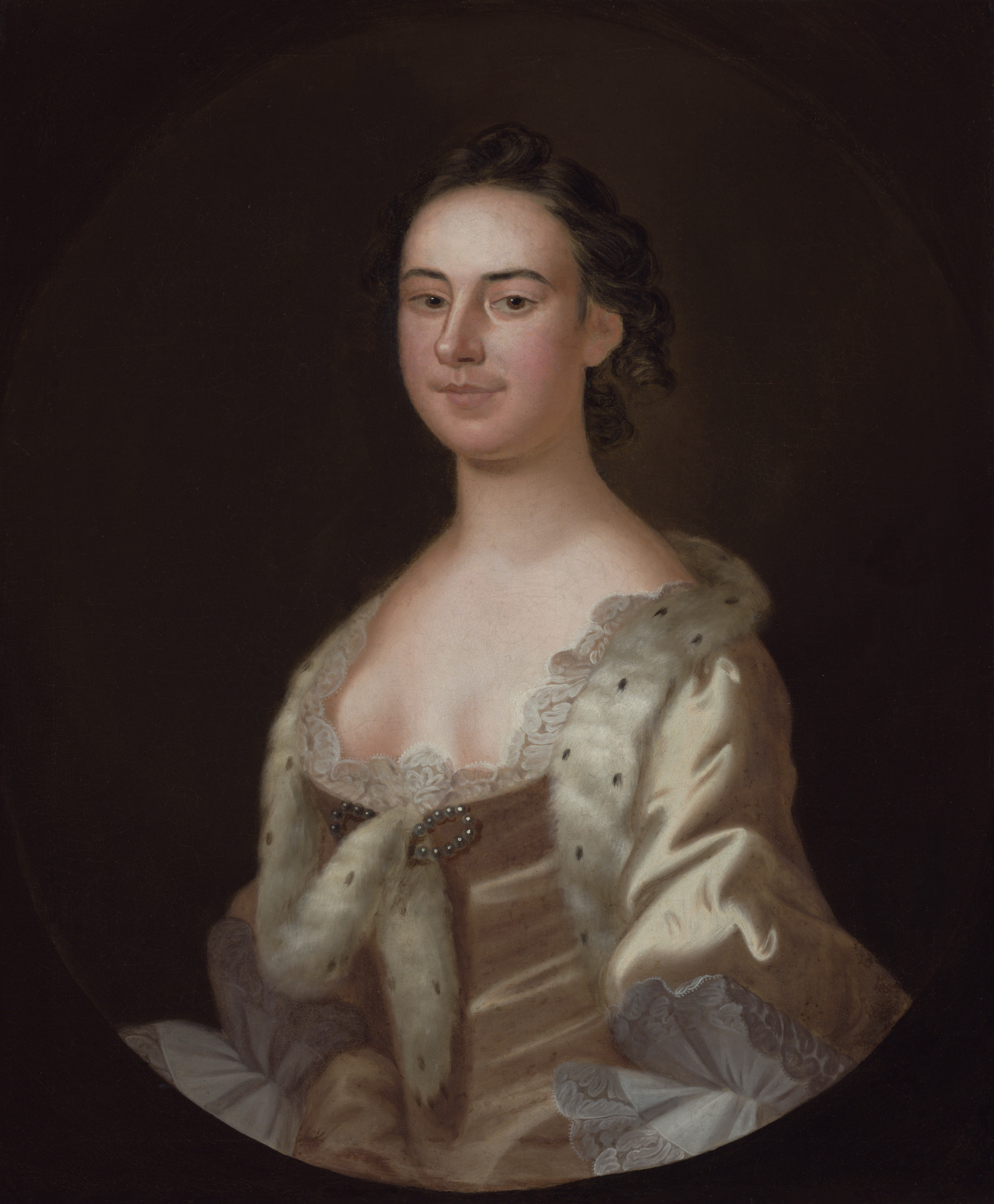
- Portrait by John Wollaston, 1754
- Born: Elizabeth Calvert; 1731; Maryland
- Died: 1788 (aged 56–57); Mount Airy, Prince George's County, Maryland
- Spouse: Benedict Swingate Calvert
- Children: 13, including: Eleanor Calvert; George Calvert
- Parent(s): Captain Charles Calvert; Rebecca Gerard

Elizabeth Calvert (1730 or 1731–1788 or 1798) was the daughter of Maryland Governor Captain Charles Calvert and wife Rebecca Gerard, and a wealthy heiress in colonial Maryland. Her parents died when she was young, leaving her their substantial fortune. In 1748, aged 17, she married her cousin Benedict Swingate Calvert, a Loyalist politician and planter and the illegitimate son of Charles Calvert, 5th Baron Baltimore. Benedict's connections to the ruling Calvert family allowed him to benefit from considerable proprietarial patronage, until the American Revolution saw the overthrow of British rule and the end of Calvert power in Maryland. Benedict and Elizabeth had to pay triple taxes after the war's end but, unlike many loyalists, their lands and fortune remained unconfiscated.

Elizabeth was the grandmother of Charles Benedict Calvert (1808–1864), a U.S. Congressman who founded what is now the University of Maryland, College Park, chartered in 1856. Elizabeth's portrait, painted by John Wollaston, still hangs on display, along with those of many of her Calvert relatives, in the Baltimore Museum of Art.

== Early life ==
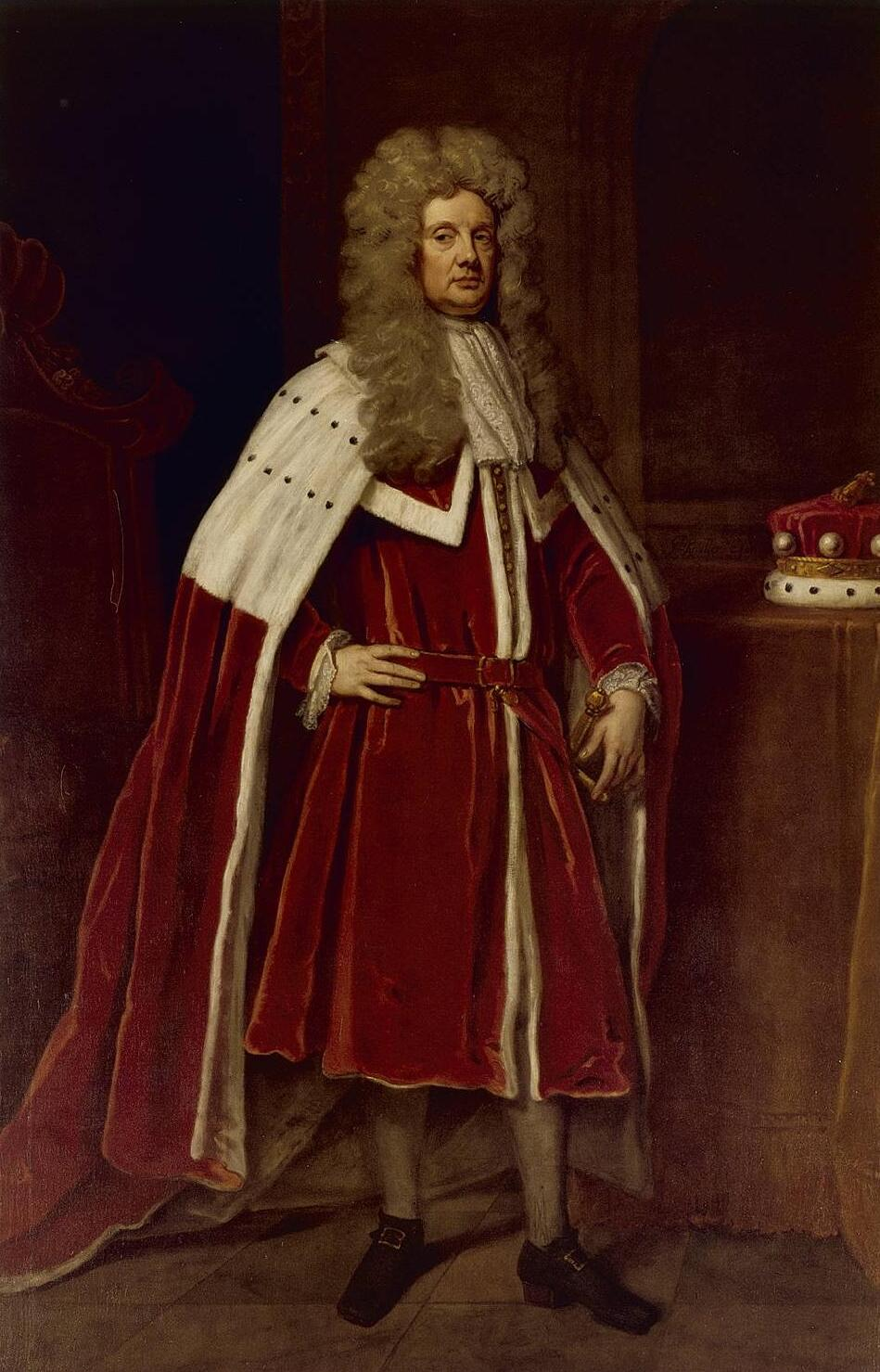
Elizabeth's probable grandfather, Charles Calvert, 3rd Baron Baltimore.

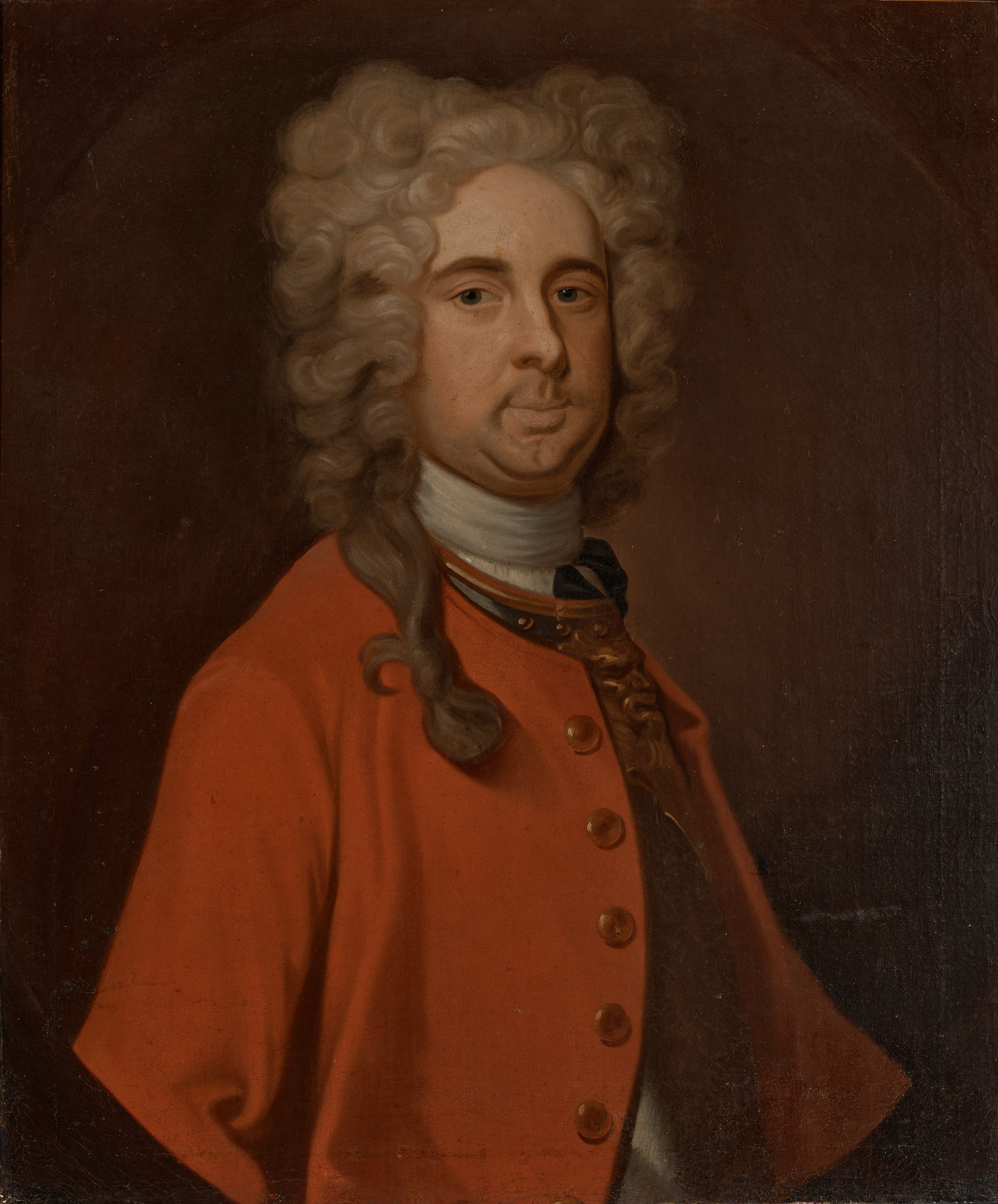
Elizabeth's father, Governor Charles Calvert

Elizabeth's father Captain Calvert (1680–1734) was governor of Maryland at a time when the Calvert family had recently regained control of their proprietary colony. He was appointed Governor by his cousin Charles Calvert, 5th Baron Baltimore, who in 1721 would travel to Maryland to take personal charge of the colony. Captain Calvert's parentage is not entirely clear since neither of his parents has been positively identified but it has long been assumed that his father was Charles Calvert, 3rd Baron Baltimore, 2nd Proprietor Governor of Maryland (1637–1715). His mother's identity is unknown but, judging by the Calvert family papers, she appears to have been the Countess Henrietta, also known as "Mother Calvert", who died circa 1728.

Elizabeth's mother, Rebecca Gerard (1708-1734/35), was a landed heiress from Maryland. Rebecca was just sixteen when the couple were married on November 21, 1722 by the rector of Queen Anne's parish, a marriage which "enlivened the whole winter season with entertainments for the new first lady", wrote Aubrey Land. She was an only child and on her marriage her property, a plantation near Queen Anne's Town in Prince George's County, passed to Captain Calvert.

Elizabeth had a brother, Charles (1723–1723/4), who died in infancy, and a sister, Anne (1724–c. 1737), who died unmarried.

Elizabeth's godfather was Captain Calvert's cousin, Benedict Leonard Calvert, governor of Maryland from 1727 to 1731, and second son of Benedict Calvert, 4th Baron Baltimore. Benedict Calvert died of consumption in 1732, while sailing to his home in England. In his will, which he drew up before leaving Maryland, he left Elizabeth, then just one year old, a slave boy named Osmyn.

Captain Calvert was replaced as governor in 1725. He suffered from early senility and died on February 2, 1734. He had arrived in Maryland a relatively poor man, but died one of the wealthiest men in the Province. On his death his estate was appraised at 4,401 pounds sterling. His wife died soon afterwards, leaving their daughter Elizabeth an orphan but a wealthy heiress.

== Marriage and family ==
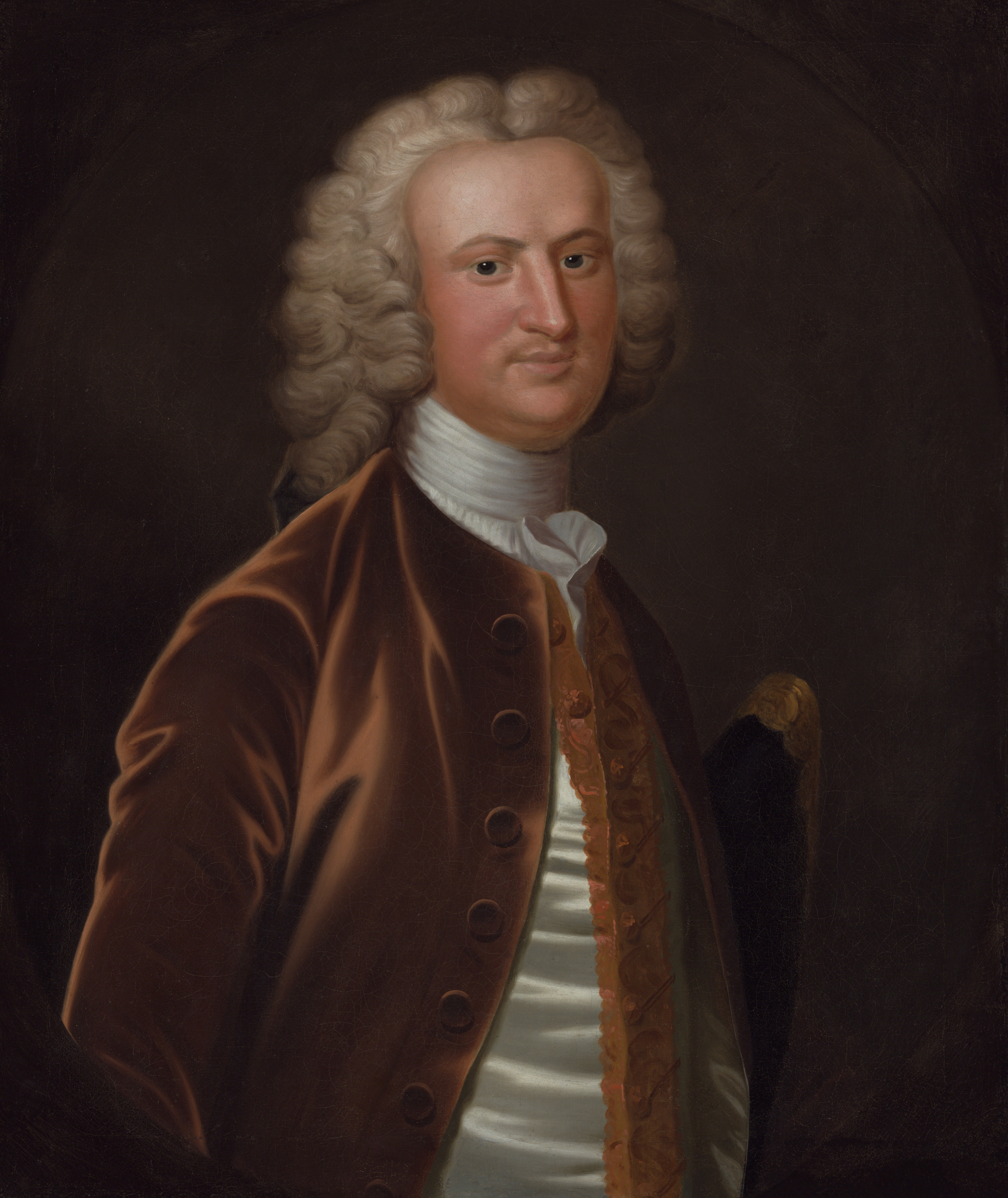
Elizabeth's husband, Benedict Swingate Calvert, painted by John Wollaston c. 1754.

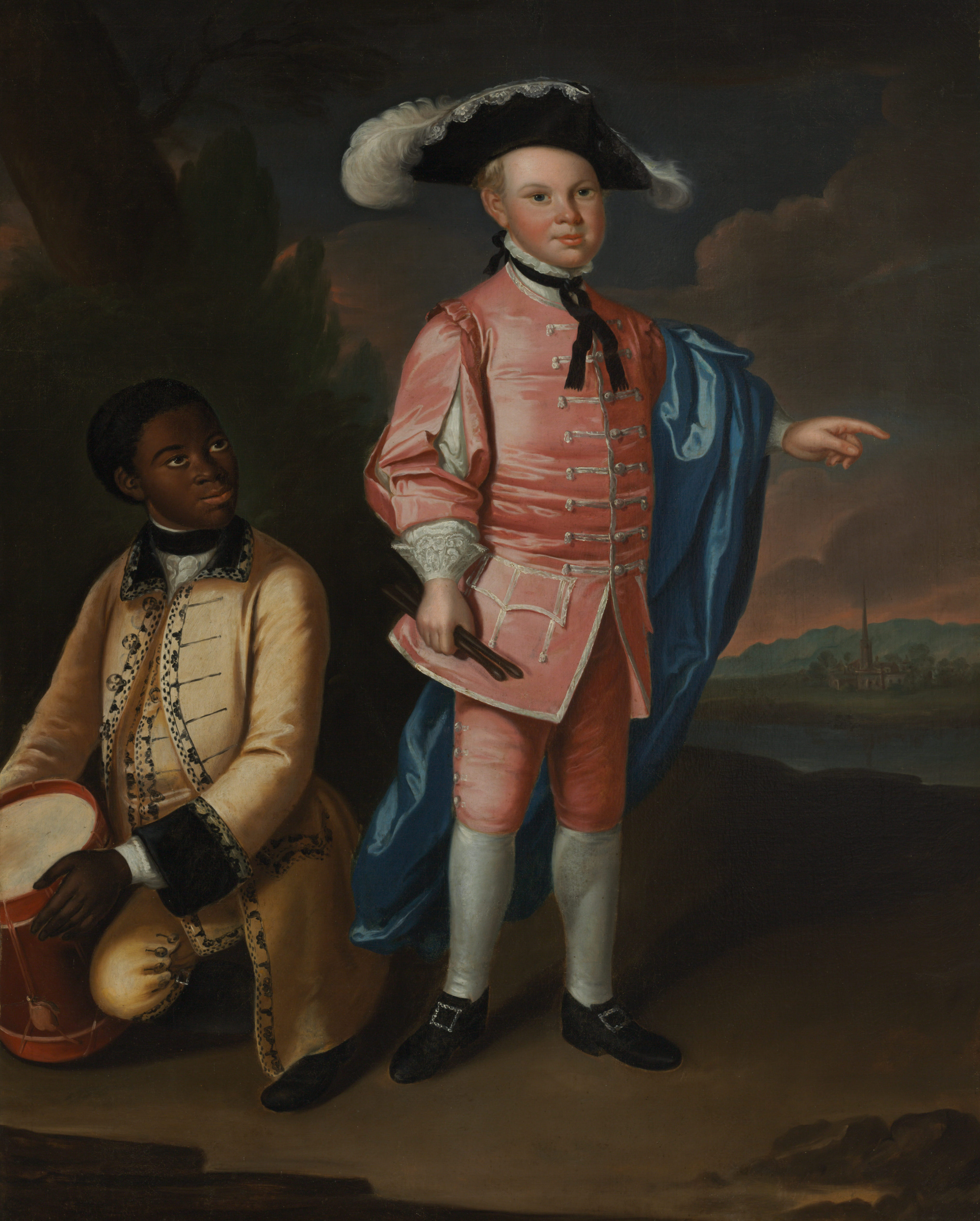
Elizabeth's eldest son Charles Calvert, painted by John Hesselius in 1761.

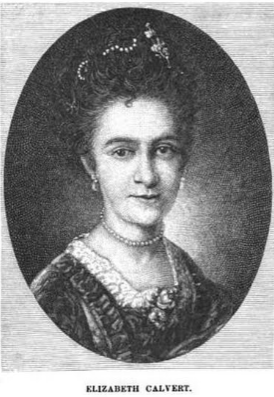
Miniature of Elizabeth Calvert (1760-1814), youngest daughter of Elizabeth and Benedict Swingate Calvert, painted by Benjamin West.

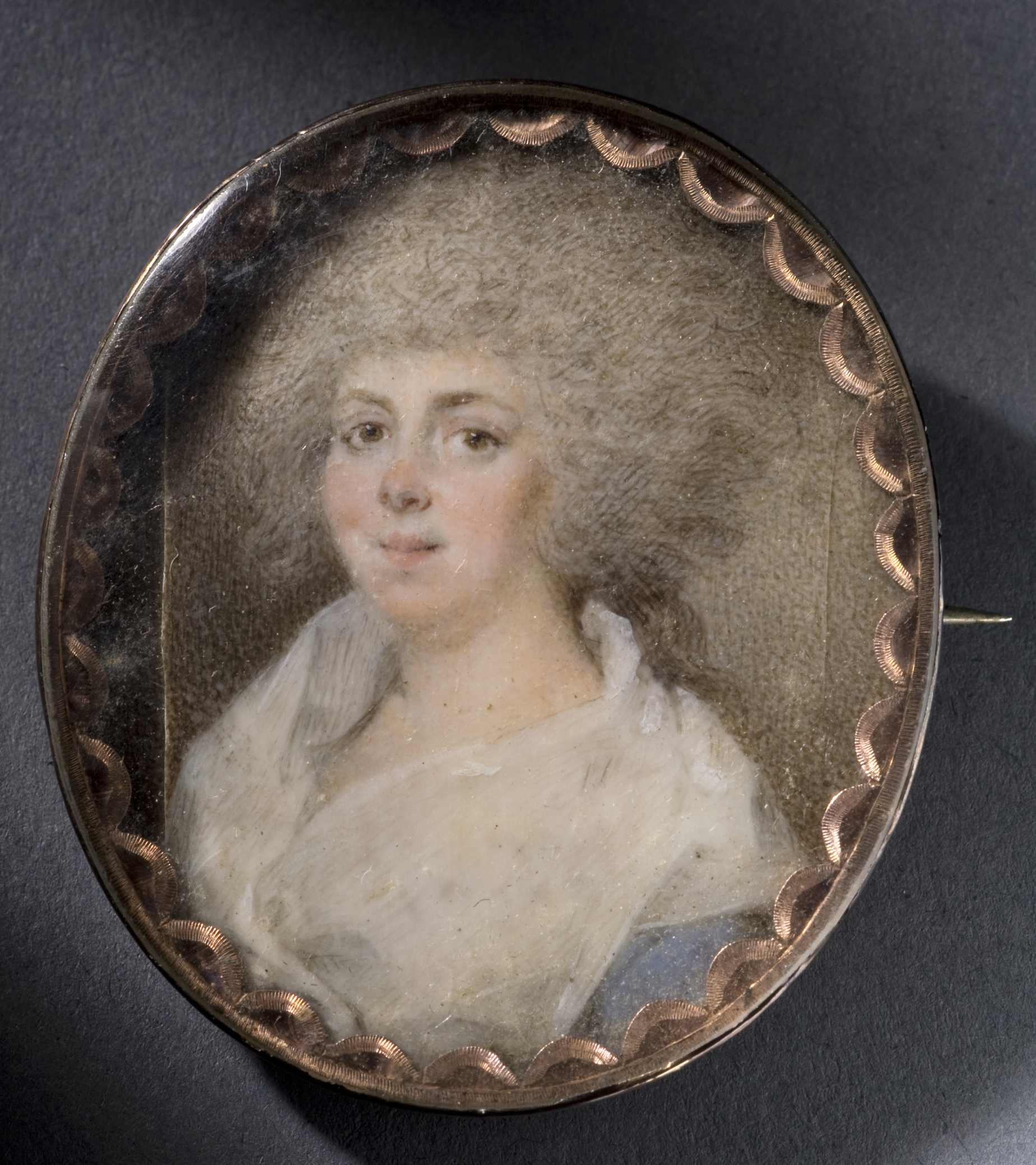
Miniature of Eleanor Calvert (1758–1811), eldest surviving daughter of Elizabeth and Benedict Swingate Calvert, c. 1780.

Elizabeth Calvert married her cousin Benedict Swingate Calvert (c. 1730-1788), on April 21, 1748, in St Ann's Church, Annapolis. The couple were married by the Reverend John Gordon. Benedict Swingate Calvert was the illegitimate son of Charles Calvert, 5th Baron Baltimore, the third Proprietor Governor of Maryland, and a wealthy planter. They had thirteen children, though only four survived to mature adulthood.

Elizabeth's husband Benedict Calvert inherited a 4,000-acre (16 km^{2}) plantation known as Mount Airy, near Upper Marlboro in Prince George's County, Maryland, where he grew tobacco. Mount Airy was most likely a gift from his father, Lord Baltimore, who had ensured that Calvert would be provided with lands and revenues. Mount Airy had originally been a hunting lodge for his great-grandfather Charles Calvert, 3rd Baron Baltimore. By the 1770s Benedict Swingate Calvert controlled a large and profitable estate of around 4,000 acres (16 km^{2}), with upwards of 150 slaves. He was also an enthusiastic horse breeder, training thoroughbreds and running them in competitions in Maryland and Virginia.

According to the writer Abbe Robin, who traveled through Maryland during the Revolutionary War, families such as the Calverts enjoyed considerable wealth and prosperity. Robin described Maryland houses as being:

large and spacious habitations, widely separated, composed of a number of buildings and surrounded by plantations extending farther than the eye can reach, cultivated...by unhappy black men whom European avarice brings hither...Their furniture is of the most costly wood, and rarest marbles, enriched by skilful and artistic work. Their elegant and light carriages are drawn by finely bred horses, and driven by richly apparelled slaves.

In 1774, Elizabeth's daughter Eleanor Calvert (1758–1811), married John Parke Custis, son of Martha Washington and the stepson of George Washington. Washington himself did not approve of the match owing to the couple's youth, but eventually gave his consent.

Benedict and Elizabeth Calvert had thirteen children:

- Rebecca Calvert (born December 25, 1749)
- Eleanor Calvert (1753-1811), twin sister of Elizabeth. Married John Parke Custis (1754–1781), son of Daniel Parke Custis and Martha Washington and the stepson of George Washington on February 3, 1774. Washington himself did not approve of the match owing to the couple's youth. Eleanor and John were the parents of George Washington Parke Custis and Eleanor Parke Custis Lewis. She later remarried in 1783 David Stuart.
- Elizabeth Calvert (1753–1814), twin sister of Eleanor. Married the physician Charles Steuart (1750–1798/1822), third son of Calvert's former guardian George H. Steuart on June 15, 1780.
- Charles Calvert (1756–1773), who was sent to be educated in England at Eton College and died there aged 17 and unmarried.
- Philip Calvert, died young
- Leonard Calvert, died young
- Cecilius Calvert, died young
- John Calvert (died aft. 1788)
- William Calvert (died aft. 1788)
- Robert Calvert, died young
- Ariana Calvert (died aft. 1788)
- Edward Henry Calvert (November 7, 1766 - July 12, 1846), who inherited Calvert's plantation at Mount Airy and married on March 1, 1796 Elizabeth Biscoe (1780–1857)
- George Calvert (Mount Airy, February 2, 1768 – January 28, 1838), who married on June 11, 1799 Rosalie Eugenia Stier (1778–1821), the daughter of a wealthy Belgian aristocrat, Baron Henri Joseph Stier (1743–1821) and his wife Marie Louise Peeters.

== American Revolution ==
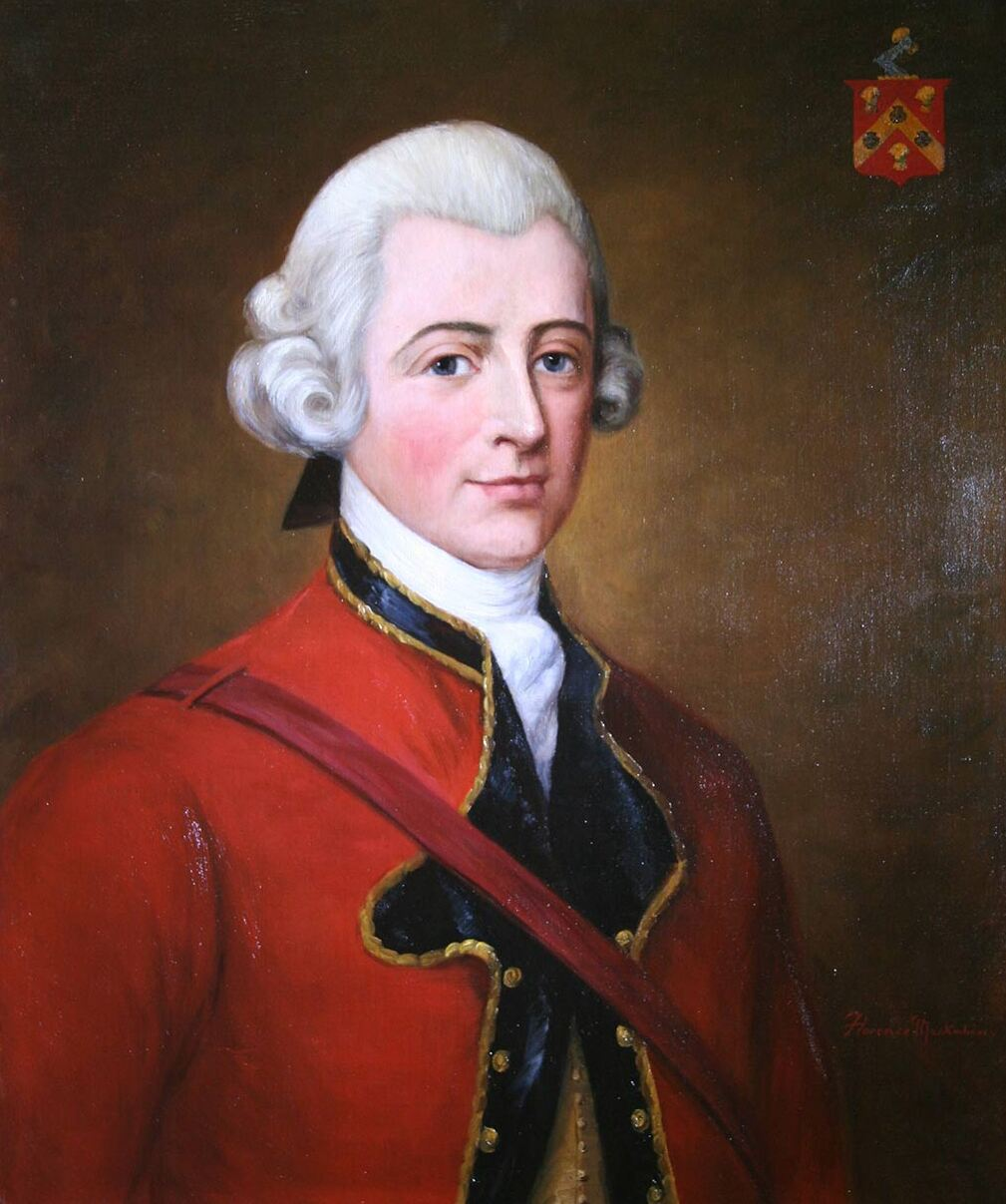
Sir Robert Eden, Elizabeth Calvert's brother-in-law, and the last colonial Governor of Maryland

As members of the Maryland political establishment, the Calverts were Loyalists, and Elizabeth soon found herself on the losing side of the Revolutionary War, the consequences of which would effectively end her husband's political career. The Annapolis Convention of 1774 to 1776 would see the old Maryland elite overthrown, and the Calverts and their allies would all lose their political power. On May 13, 1777 Elizabeth's husband was forced to resign his position as Judge of the Land Office, and, as the conflict grew, Benedict became fearful of his family's safety, writing in late 1777 that his family "has been made so uneasy by these frequent outrages" that he wished to "remove my family and property where I can get protection".

Despite the danger, Elizabeth did not leave Maryland. On occasion she and her husband supplied the Continental Army with food and provisions.

=== After the war ===
After the war's end, the Calverts had to pay triple taxes as did other Loyalists, but they were never forced to sign the loyalty oath and their lands and property remained unconfiscated.

Curiously, Elizabeth and her husband's Loyalism does not appear to have affected their family's cordial relations with the leader of the Revolution, George Washington. In 1783, after the war was over, Washington stayed with the Calverts at their Mount Airy plantation, shortly after resigning his commission in Annapolis on December 23. Because the Calverts were known Loyalists, the visit drew much criticism from Washington's political enemies.

Elizabeth died in 1788, at the age of 57.

== Legacy ==
The Calverts' house at 58 State Circle, Annapolis, was the subject of an archeological dig in the 1980s and early 1990s. The results of the dig, along with much other research, were published in 1994 by Anne Elizabeth Yentsch in her book A Chesapeake Family and their Slaves, published by Cambridge University Press. The excavation of the Calvert House was financed by Historic Annapolis Inc, the National Endowment for the Humanities, and other institutions. She is buried beside her husband in Page's Chapel, St. Thomas' Church Croom, Maryland.

== See also ==
- Province of Maryland
- Colonial families of Maryland
- Calvert family
