= Charles Calvert (governor) =

British Army officer and colonial administrator (1688–1734)

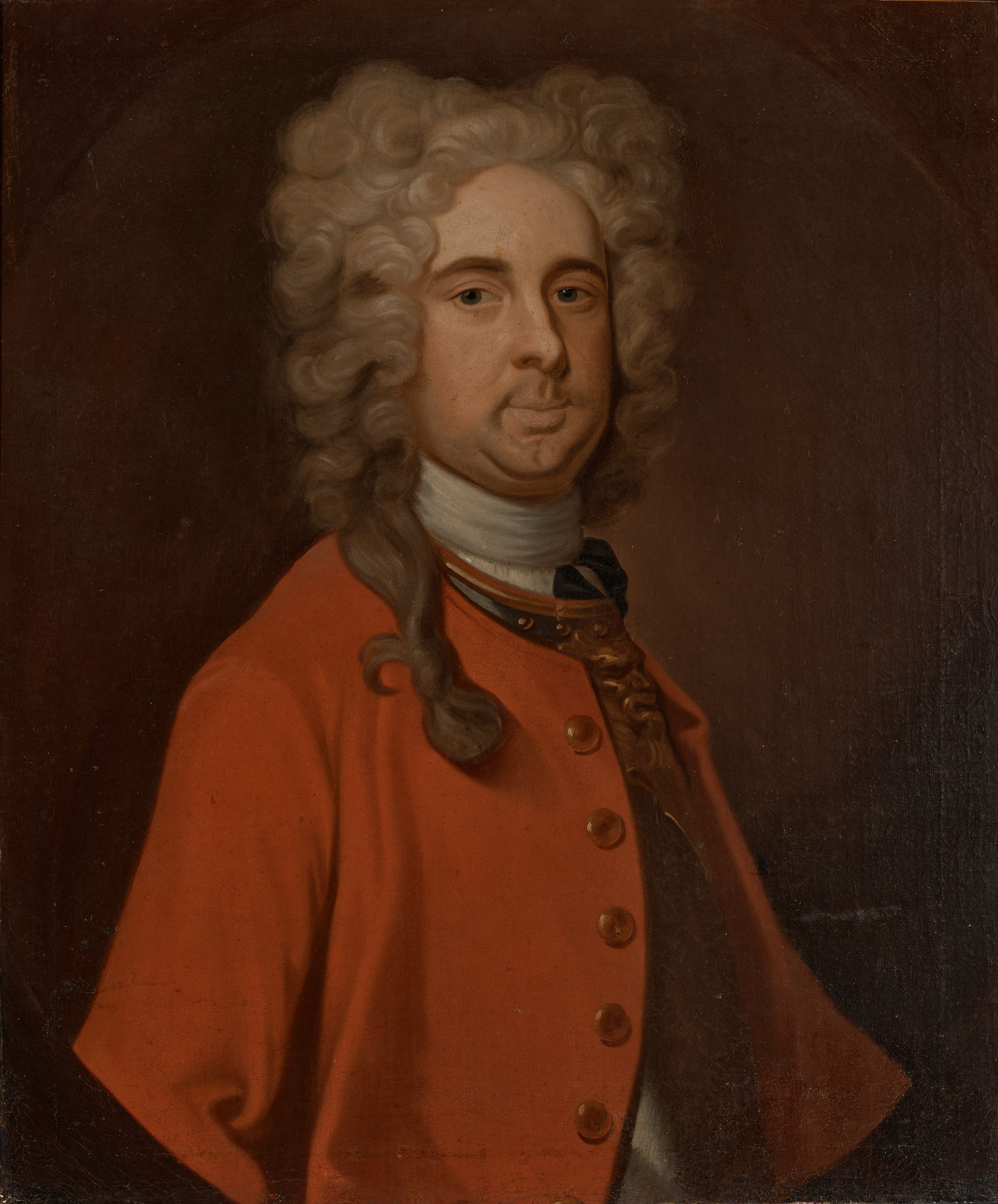
- Portrait by John Wollaston, 1754

Governor of Maryland
- In office 1720–1727
- Preceded by: Thomas Brooke
- Succeeded by: Benedict Leonard Calvert

Surveyor General to the Western Shore
- In office 1726 – c. 1733

Commissary General
- In office 1727–1728

Personal details
- Born: 1688 England
- Died: February 2, 1734 (aged 45–46) Maryland
- Spouse: Rebecca Gerard
- Children: 3, including Elizabeth Calvert
- Occupation: Military officer, colonial administrator, planter

Captain Charles Calvert (born Charles Calvert Lazenby; c. 1688 – February 2, 1734) was a British Army officer and colonial administrator who served as the governor of Maryland from 1720 to 1727. Serving during a period when the Calvert family had recently regained control of the Province of Maryland, he was appointed governor by his cousin Charles Calvert, 5th Baron Baltimore, who in 1721 came into his inheritance over the colony.

Calvert worked to reassert the Proprietary interest against the privileges of the colonists as set out in the Maryland Charter, and to ease tensions between the Lords Baltimore and their Maryland subjects. Religious tension, which had been a source of great division in the colony, was much reduced under his governorship. Calvert was replaced as governor in 1727 by his cousin Benedict Leonard Calvert, though he continued to occupy other colonial offices. He suffered from early senility and died in 1734.

== Early life and ancestry ==
Arms of the Barons Baltimore

Calvert was born Charles Calvert Lazenby in England in 1688. Neither of his parents has been positively identified but it may be that his father was Charles Calvert, 3rd Baron Baltimore, 2nd Proprietor Governor of Maryland (1637–1715), or another member of the Calvert family. His mother's identity in unknown but, judging by the Calvert family papers, she may have been the "Countess Henrietta", also known as "Mother Calvert", who died circa 1728. However, in Douglas Richardson's Plantagenet Ancestry: A Study In Colonial And Medieval Families, 2nd Edition (pg 467), no illegitimate children are listed under Charles Calvert, 3rd Baron Baltimore. There is no mention of Calvert (Lazenby).

== Military career ==
Calvert served in the War of the Spanish Succession, most likely reaching the rank of ensign by around 1709. In 1718 Calvert purchased further commissions in the British Army, becoming at aged 30 first a lieutenant and later a captain in the 1st Regiment of Foot Guards, promotions which most likely were financed by his wealthy Calvert patrons. The regiment was among the most prestigious in the British Army and commissions for it were comparatively expensive.

== Governor of Maryland ==
Calvert was appointed Governor of Maryland in around 1720, sent to advance the interests of his Calvert relatives, who had recently regained control of the colony of Maryland which had been confiscated by the Crown following the events of the Glorious Revolution in 1688. Among the reasons for his appointment were his loyalty to the Crown, his desire to live permanently in Maryland, and above all else his presumed loyalty to the family interest. Calvert was a pragmatic man not given to ostentation. His opening speech to the Assembly was brief, inviting the delegates "to let time and my actions show" that his governorship would serve the interests of the colony.

According to Aubrey Land, his mission was initially "soothing tempers and making peace". He laboured to strike an acceptable balance between the interests of the Maryland colonists and those of the Lord Proprietor, and in addition to manage relations with the local Algonquian tribes. To this end Calvert entered into negotiations with the tribal chiefs of the Seneca, Tuscarora and Shawnee Indians.

Calvert replaced as Governor the Protestant Thomas Brooke, whose "malicious designs" he had been sent to bring to an end. Early on he worked to reassert the Proprietary interest and prerogative against the privileges of the colonists as set out in the Maryland Charter. He also worked to ease tensions between the propriety government and its subjects. In a speech in 1725 he suggested that their differences might be of a devilish nature:

I am afraid some Evil Spirits walk among us and it would be a matter of Great pleasure to such, to have your house [the people of Maryland] and mine [Lord Baltimore] att Variance, but for my own part, I defy the Devill and his Works to do it.

== Marriage ==
As governor of the Province, Calvert was an eligible bachelor. He took as his wife Rebecca Gerard (1708-1734/35) a landed heiress from Maryland, who was just sixteen when the couple were married on November 21, 1722 by the rector of Queen Anne's parish, a marriage which "enlivened the whole winter season with entertainments for the new first lady", wrote Aubrey Land. She was an only child and on her marriage her property, a slave plantation near Queen Anne's Town in Prince George's County, passed to Calvert's ownership.

Calvert was an excellent horseman and promoted horse racing during his tenure as governor. When he died he left behind a thoroughbred worth 18 pounds sterling, a considerable sum at the time.

== Religion ==
The religious disputes which had characterized Maryland politics in earlier years were subdued under Calvert's rule. Rules forbidding the practice of Roman Catholicism were relaxed and, in general, religious conflict was much reduced.

== Replacement as governor ==
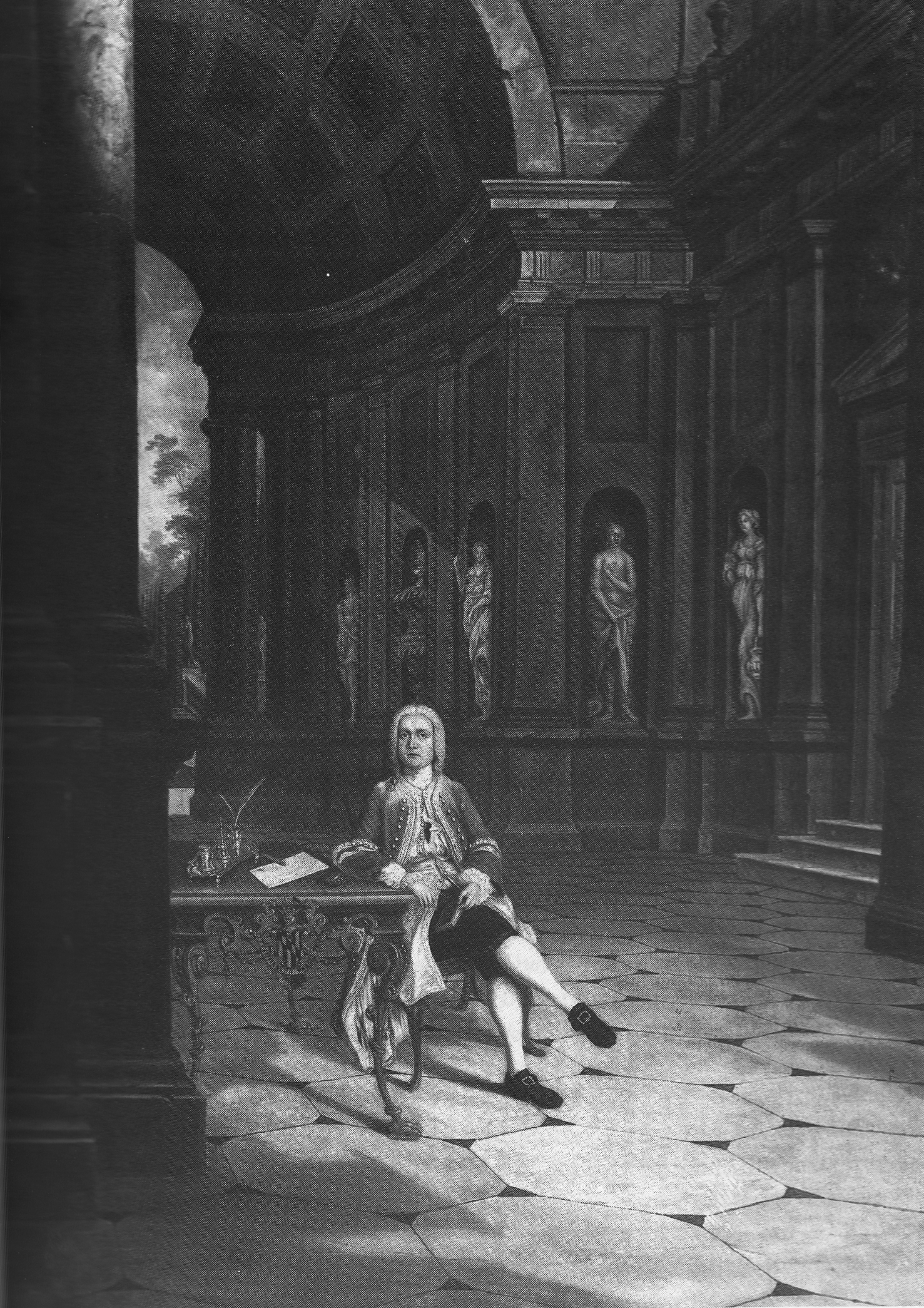
Benedict Leonard Calvert, who replaced Calvert as governor of Maryland in 1727

Captain Calvert was replaced as governor when his cousin Benedict Leonard Calvert, brother of Charles Calvert, 5th Baron Baltimore, arrived in Maryland in 1727. The handover of power to his cousin was not entirely smooth. Captain Calvert insisted on retaining fifty percent of the 3 pence tobacco duty which was his due under legislation passed in 1727. Benedict was not impressed, and his younger brother Cecilius wrote to him that family opinion in England was appalled at Captain Calvert's behaviour, and "thinks him mad". Lord Baltimore himself wrote that Benedict should receive the full benefit of the tax. From 1726 to c. 1733 Calvert served as Surveyor General to the Western Shore.

== Family life ==
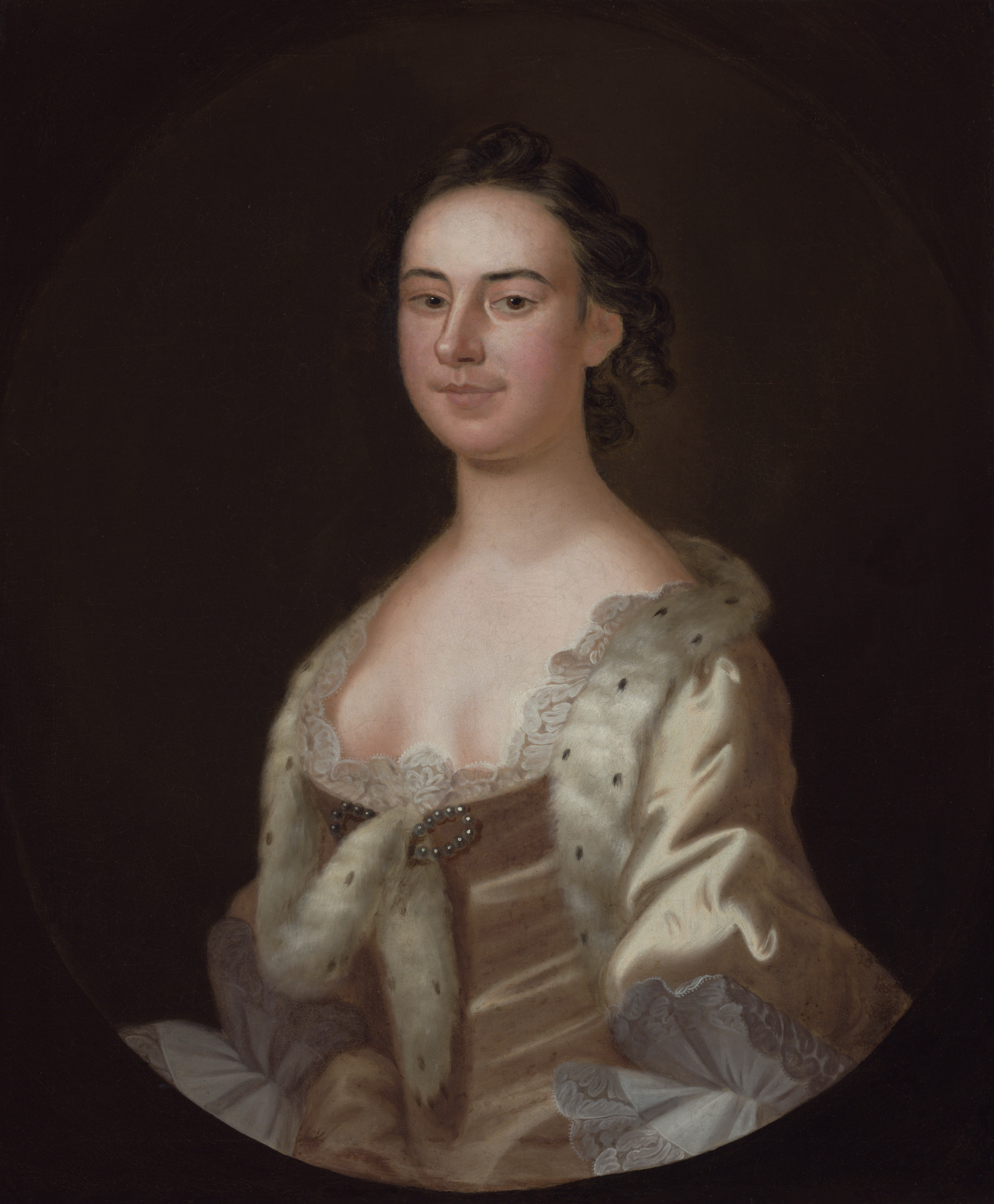
1754 portrait of Calvert's daughter Elizabeth by John Wollaston in 1754

The Calverts had three children:

- Charles (1723–1724), died in infancy.
- Anne (1724–c.1737), died in childhood.
- Elizabeth Calvert (1730–1798), who married her cousin Benedict Swingate Calvert (c. 1730-1788), on April 21, 1748, in St Ann's Church, Annapolis. The couple were married by the Reverend John Gordon. Benedict Swingate Calvert was the illegitimate son of Charles Calvert, 5th Baron Baltimore, the third Proprietor Governor of Maryland, and a wealthy planter. They had thirteen children. Elizabeth's godfather was Captain Calvert's cousin, Benedict Leonard Calvert, second son of Benedict Calvert, 4th Baron Baltimore, who died of consumption in 1732.

== Illness and death ==
Captain Calvert suffered from early senility and died on February 2, 1734, aged 42. He had arrived in Maryland a relatively poor man, but died one of the wealthiest men in the Province. On his death his estate was appraised at 4,401 pounds sterling. His wife Rebecca died soon afterwards, and in 1737 their daughter Anne died, leaving their last remaining child Elizabeth an orphan, but a wealthy heiress.

== Legacy ==
Captain Calvert's house at 58 State Circle, Annapolis, was the subject of an archeological dig in the 1980s and early 1990s. The results of the dig, along with much other research, were published in 1994 by Anne Elizabeth Yentsch in her book A Chesapeake Family and their Slaves, published by Cambridge University Press. The excavation of the Calvert House was financed by Historic Annapolis Inc, the National Endowment for the Humanities, and other institutions. The building is now part of the Historic Inns of Annapolis. The excavation revealed a hypocaust, part of the original 1720s construction, used to heat a tropical greenhouse.

== See also ==
- List of colonial governors of Maryland
- Province of Maryland
- Baron Baltimore
- Colonial families of Maryland
- Calvert family
