= William Joseph (governor) =

11th Proprietary Governor of Maryland

11th Proprietary-Governor of Maryland
- In office 1688–1689
- Preceded by: Benedict Calvert
- Succeeded by: John Coode

William Joseph was the 11th Proprietary Governor of Maryland from 1688 to 1689. He was appointed by the colony's proprietor Charles Calvert, 3rd Baron Baltimore. Joseph attempted to maintain control of the colony in the proprietor's name, but religious turmoil related to the Glorious Revolution in England led to Joseph's being removed from office by Protestant colonists and the Calvert family losing control of the colony.

== Term as Governor ==
The Catholic Calvert family established Maryland as a place where English Catholics, who were a religious minority, could find religious tolerance. However, many of the colonists who arrived in Maryland were Protestant. In 1681, Protestant colonists, especially members of the Anglican Church, began a series of local rebellions against proprietary control by Calvert. Calvert appointed Joseph in the hope that he would be able to stop these rebellions.

It is not clear whether Joseph was actually appointed Governor or the head of the colony's Council of Deputy Governors. Legally, the Governor of the colony from 1684 was Calvert's young son, Benedict Leonard Calvert. However, executive power in the colony was for all practical purposes led by the Council, which included a number of prominent colonists. Despite this, the State of Maryland includes Joseph on their list of proprietary Governors.

=== Protestant Revolution of 1689 ===
By the time Joseph arrived in Maryland, religious conflict in England had reached a peak during the events of the Glorious Revolution, in which the Catholic King James II was overthrown and replaced with the Protestant William of Orange. It would take time for this news to arrive in the colony. Joseph, an Irishman and like Calvert a Catholic, was a strong supporter of the King. Soon after his arrival, he asked the Assembly to create a holiday on the date of the birth of James II's heir. He also implemented a number of unpopular reforms at the request of the proprietor. Export of tobacco was limited to high-quality cask tobacco more easily produced by large landholders. In addition, Calvert had ordered that all future tax payments were to be made in specie rather than in tobacco.

When news reached the colony that the King had been deposed, Joseph attempted to maintain control by asking planters to turn in their weapons and temporarily cancelling the meeting of the colonial assembly scheduled for April. Protestant settlers began gathering in armed groups, partially fueled by rumors that the Catholics would ally with Native Americans to drive Protestants out of the colony. Joseph attempted one final time to convince the colonial assembly to support the deposed King, but Protestant colonists seized control of the colony in July.

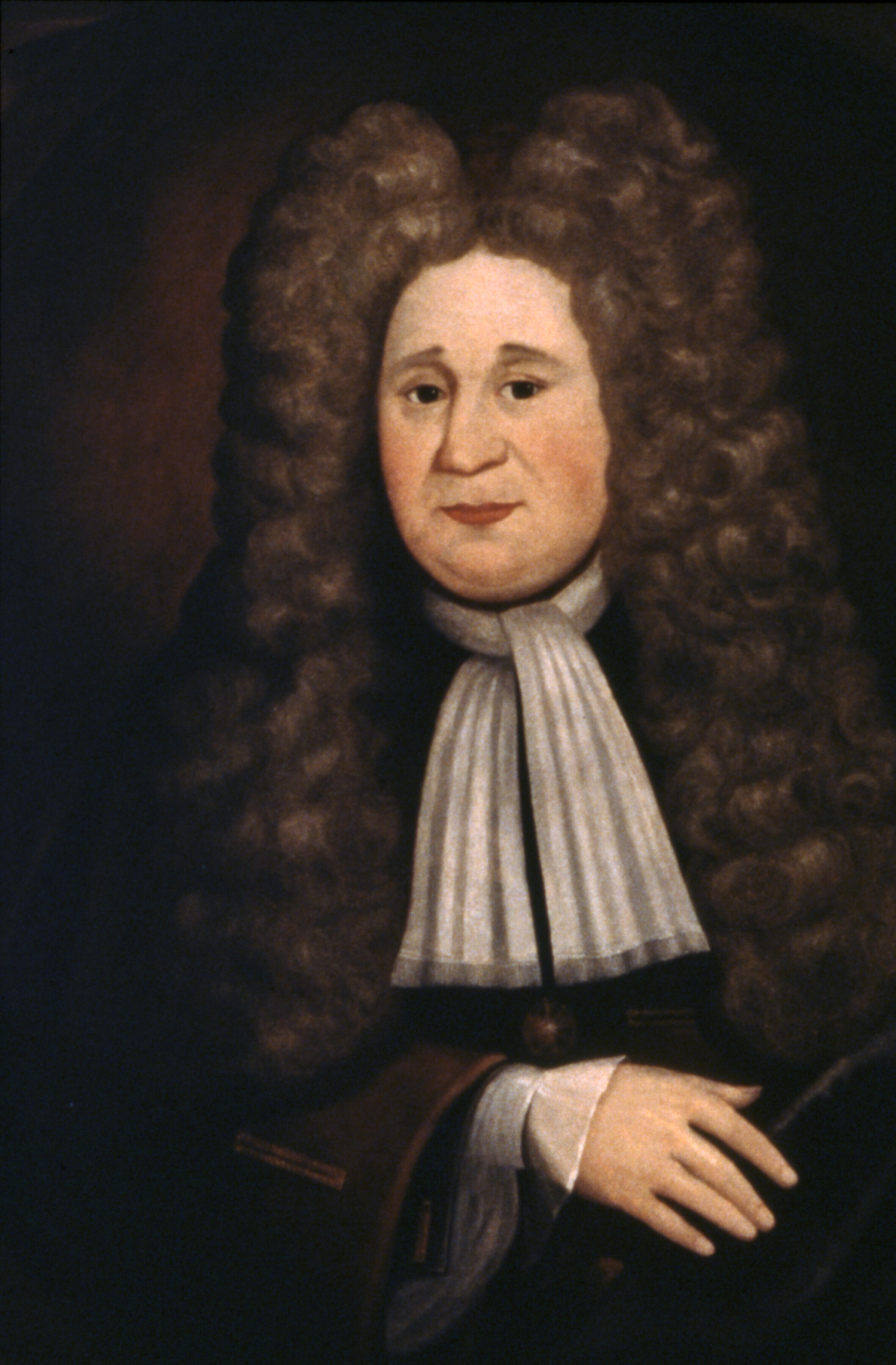
Col. Henry Darnall, Deputy Governor of Maryland and a Roman Catholic.

In 1689, Maryland Puritans, by now a substantial majority in the colony, revolted against the proprietary government, in part because of the apparent preferment of Catholics like Joseph and Deputy Governor Colonel Henry Darnall to official positions of power. Led by Colonel John Coode, an army of 700 Puritans defeated a proprietorial army led by Colonel Darnall. Darnall later wrote: "Wee being in this condition and no hope left of quieting the people thus enraged, to prevent effusion of blood, capitulated and surrendered." The victorious Coode and his Puritans set up a new government that outlawed Catholicism, and Darnall was deprived of all his official positions.

=== Flight from Maryland ===
Joseph and other prominent Catholics fled the colony, possibly taking some of the colony's arms and ammunition stores with them. Joseph was replaced with John Coode, a leader of a group known as the Protestant Associators, who had been a primary instigator of the rebellion. Although John Coode and his followers later claimed that the rebellion had been a peaceful one, they were accused, among other crimes, of plundering the estates of those who supported the proprietary regime and embezzling the colony's revenue. Coode and his followers claimed that in addition to the religious concerns that underlay the rebellion, the previous regime had not adequately provided for the poor in the colony and had instead burdened them with high taxation. In addition to replacing Joseph, the new colonial leaders were eventually successful in having proprietary control removed from the Calvert family and in barring Catholics from voting, bearing arms, or serving on juries. In 1704 an Act was passed "to prevent the growth of Popery in this Province", preventing Catholics from holding political office. Full religious toleration would not be restored in Maryland until the American Revolution.

== See also ==
- List of colonial governors of Maryland
