= Benedict Leonard Calvert =

English colonial governor of Maryland (1700–1732)

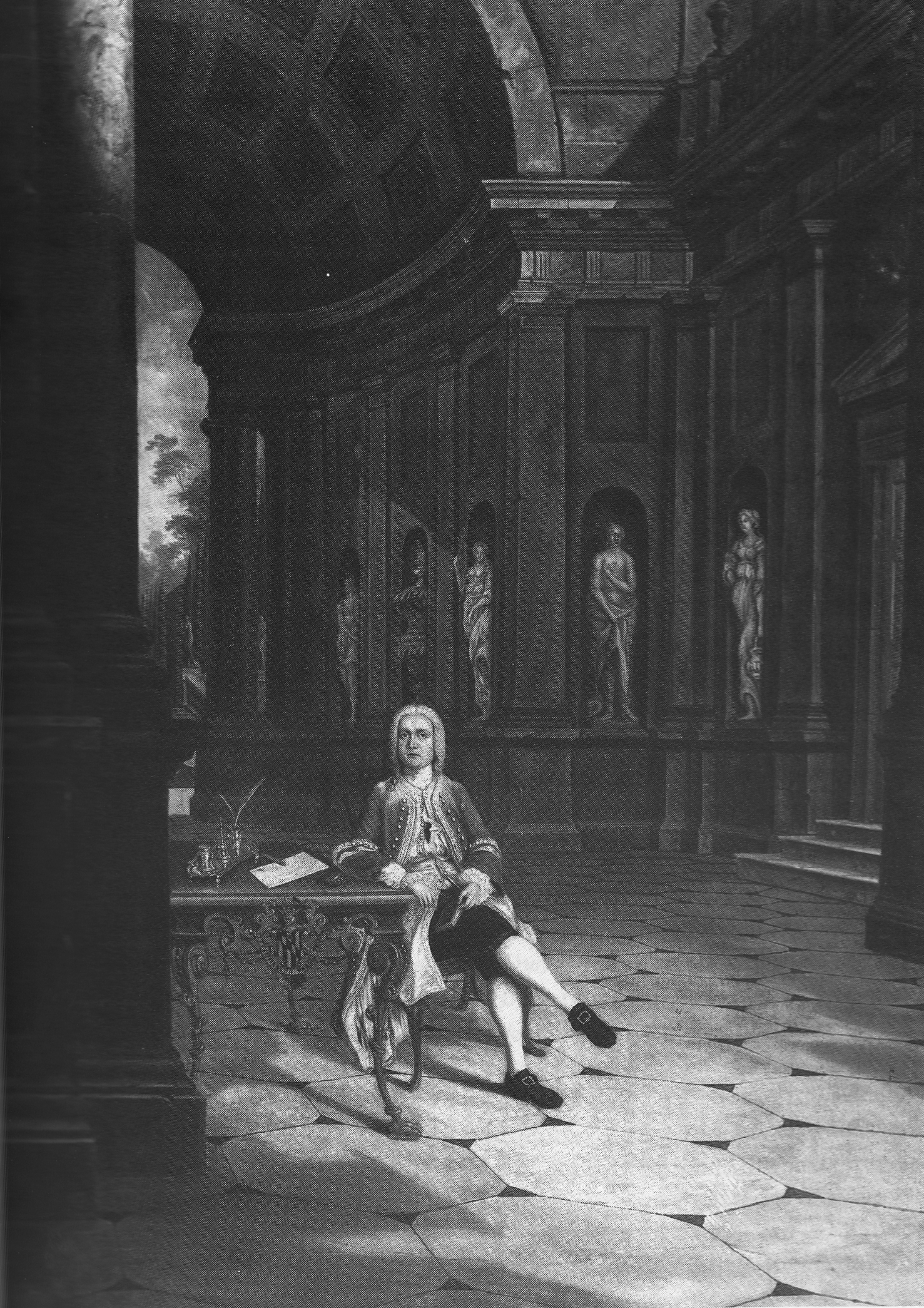
- Portrait by Francis Brerewood, c. 1726

4th Governor of Restored Proprietary Government
- In office 1727–1731
- Preceded by: Charles Calvert
- Succeeded by: Samuel Ogle

Personal details
- Born: 20 September 1700 Surrey, England
- Died: 1 June 1732 (aged 31)
- Parent(s): Benedict Calvert, 4th Baron Baltimore; Charlotte Lee, Lady Baltimore
- Occupation: planter, politician

Benedict Leonard Calvert (20 September 1700 – 1 June 1732) was the 15th Proprietary Governor of Maryland from 1727 through 1731, appointed by his older brother, Charles Calvert, 5th Baron Baltimore (1699–1751). He was named after his father, Benedict Calvert, 4th Baron Baltimore (1679–1715). Calvert had tuberculosis and died from it on board the family ship, The Charles, on 1 June 1732, while returning to his home in England, aged 31.

== Early life ==
Like many young aristocrats in 18th-century England, Calvert was sent on a Grand Tour of Italy, travelling there from 1724 to 1725. During this time he studied Italian architecture and antiquities, collecting many items which were sent back to the family home at Woodcote Park in Surrey.

== Governor of Maryland ==
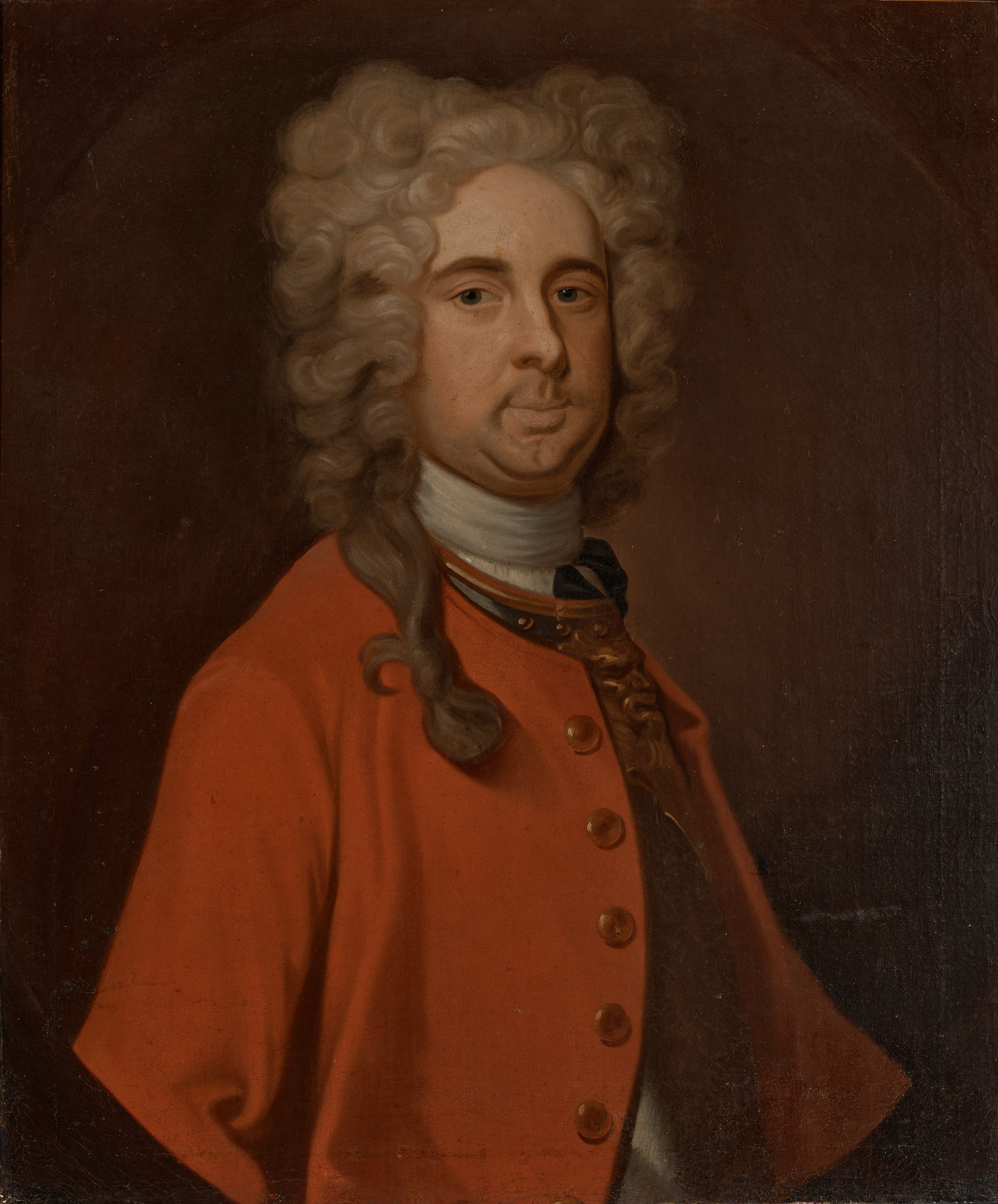
Charles Calvert, replaced as Governor of Maryland by Benedict Calvert in 1727

In 1727 the young Benedict Calvert was sent to Maryland by his older brother Lord Baltimore, with instructions to take over the governorship of the colony, replacing his cousin Captain Charles Calvert. The handover of power from cousin to cousin was not entirely smooth. Captain Calvert insisted on retaining fifty percent of the three-pence tobacco duty which was his due under legislation passed in 1727. Benedict was not impressed, and his younger brother Cecilius wrote to him that family opinion in England was appalled at Captain Calvert's behaviour, and "thinks him mad". Lord Baltimore himself wrote that Benedict should receive the full benefit of the tax.

Benedict Calvert was replaced as Governor by Samuel Ogle in 1731. On arrival in Maryland, Ogle wrote to Lord Baltimore that his brother was "much worse than I imagined, and which I believe has not been mended very much by the help of Physik, of which he takes more than anyone I ever knew in my life".

Calvert was elected a fellow of the Royal Society in March, 1731.

== Death ==
Calvert had tuberculosis and died of consumption on board the family ship, The Charles on 1 June 1732, while returning to his home in England. He was buried at sea. He left an estate worth around ten thousand pounds sterling, a large sum at the time, to his younger brother Cecilius Calvert.

== Legacy ==
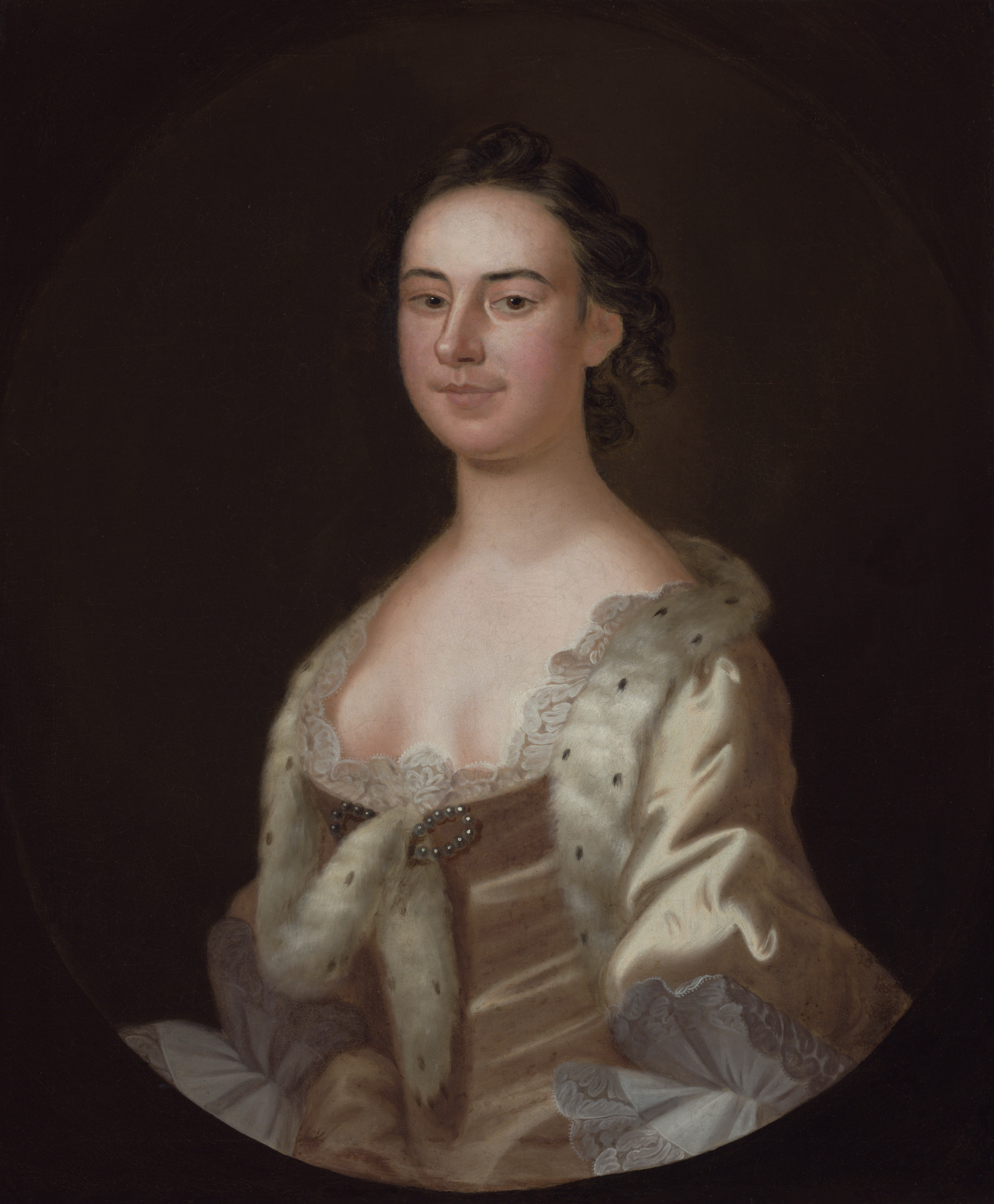
Benedict Calvert's goddaughter, Elizabeth Calvert

Calvert had no children of his own, but he was godfather to Elizabeth Calvert, daughter of his cousin Captain Charles Calvert. In his will, which he drew up before leaving Maryland, he left her a slave boy named Osmyn.

The town of Leonardtown, Maryland is named in his honor.

== See also ==
- Baron Baltimore
- List of colonial governors of Maryland
- Province of Maryland
