= Charles Calvert, 3rd Baron Baltimore =

English colonial administrator (1637–1715)

The Right Honourable The Lord Baltimore
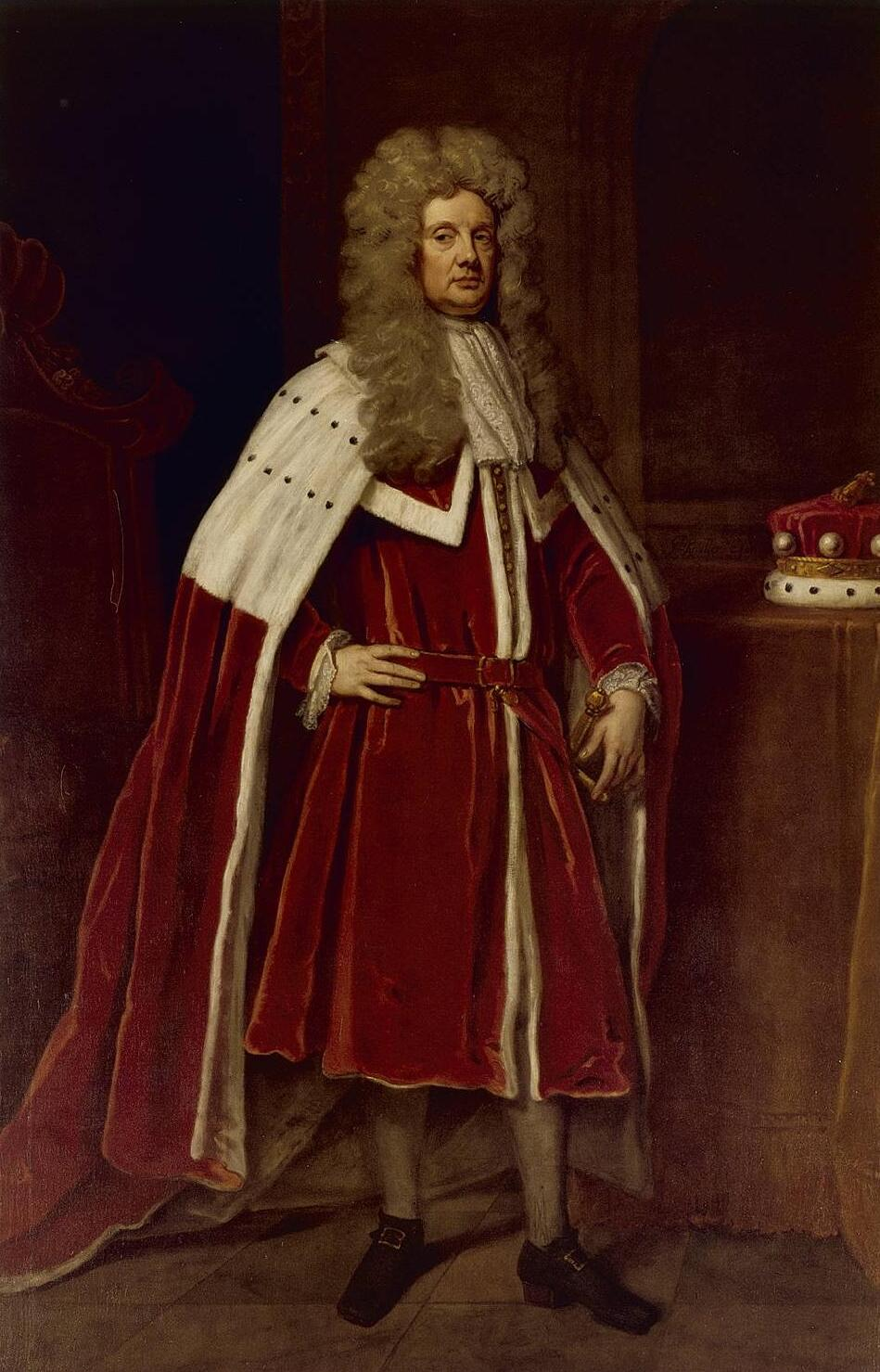
- Portrait by Sir Godfrey Kneller, 1675–1715

6th and 9th Proprietary-Governor of Maryland
- In office 1661–1676
- Preceded by: Phillip Calvert
- Succeeded by: Jesse Wharton
- In office 1679–1684
- Preceded by: Thomas Notley
- Succeeded by: Benedict Calvert, 4th Baron Baltimore, (1679–1715)

Personal details
- Born: August 27, 1637 Salisbury, England
- Died: February 21, 1715 (aged 77) London, England
- Spouse(s): Mary Darnall; Jane Lowe; Mary Bankes; Margaret Charleton
- Children: Mary Calvert; Cecil Calvert; Benedict Calvert, 4th Baron Baltimore; Capt. Charles Calvert (illegitimate)
- Parent(s): Cecilius Calvert, 2nd Baron Baltimore; Anne Arundell

Charles Calvert, 3rd Baron Baltimore (August 27, 1637 – February 21, 1715) was an English colonial administrator. He inherited the province of Maryland in 1675 upon the death of his father, Cecil Calvert, 2nd Baron Baltimore. He had been his father's Deputy Governor since 1661 when he arrived in the colony at the age of 24. However, Charles left Maryland for England in 1684 and would never return. The events following the Glorious Revolution in England in 1688 would cost Calvert his title to Maryland; in 1689 the royal charter to the colony was withdrawn, leading to direct rule by the British Crown. Calvert's political problems were largely caused by his Roman Catholic faith which was at odds with the established Church of England.

Calvert married four times, outliving three wives, and had at least two children. He died in England in 1715 at the age of 78, his family fortunes much diminished. With his death he passed his title, and his claim to Maryland, to his second son Benedict Calvert, 4th Baron Baltimore (1679–1715), his eldest son Cecil having died young. However, Benedict Calvert would outlive his father by just two months, and it would fall to Charles' grandson, Charles (1699–1751), who converted to the Anglican faith, to see the family proprietorship in the Province of Maryland restored by the king.

== Early life ==
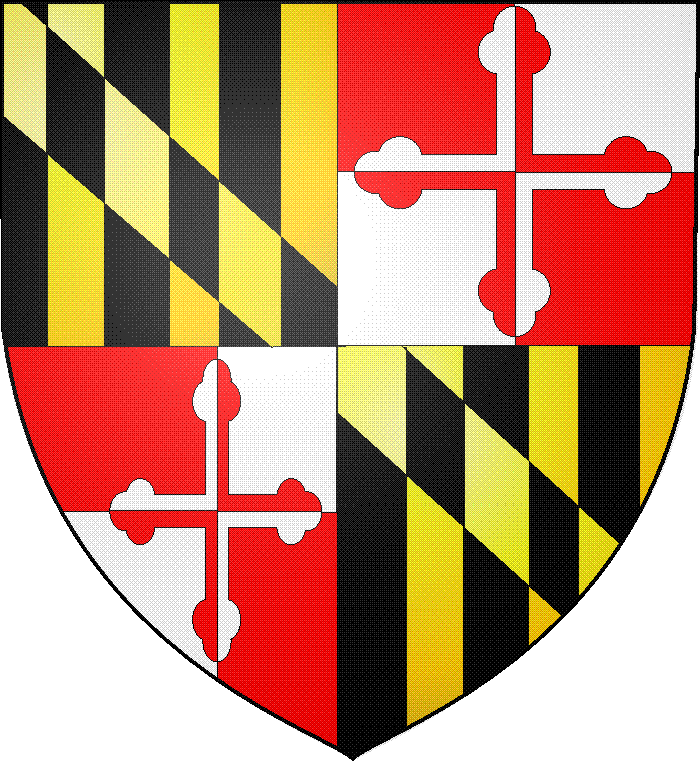
Baltimore's coat of arms, which became the flag of Maryland

Charles was born in England on August 27, 1637, and witnessed the religious conflicts of the English Civil War. His father, Cecil Calvert, 2nd Baron Baltimore (1605–1675), was the first Proprietor Governor of Maryland, and 9th Proprietor Governor of Newfoundland (including "Avalon", the Calvert's earliest colony). His mother was Anne Arundell, (c. 1615/16–1649), daughter of the 1st Baron Arundell of Wardour (1550–1639).

Anne and Cecil were married in 1627 or 1628, and had nine children. However, only two of Charles' siblings survived to adulthood, and Anne herself died in 1649 when the young Charles was just 12 years old.

== Maryland ==
=== Political background ===
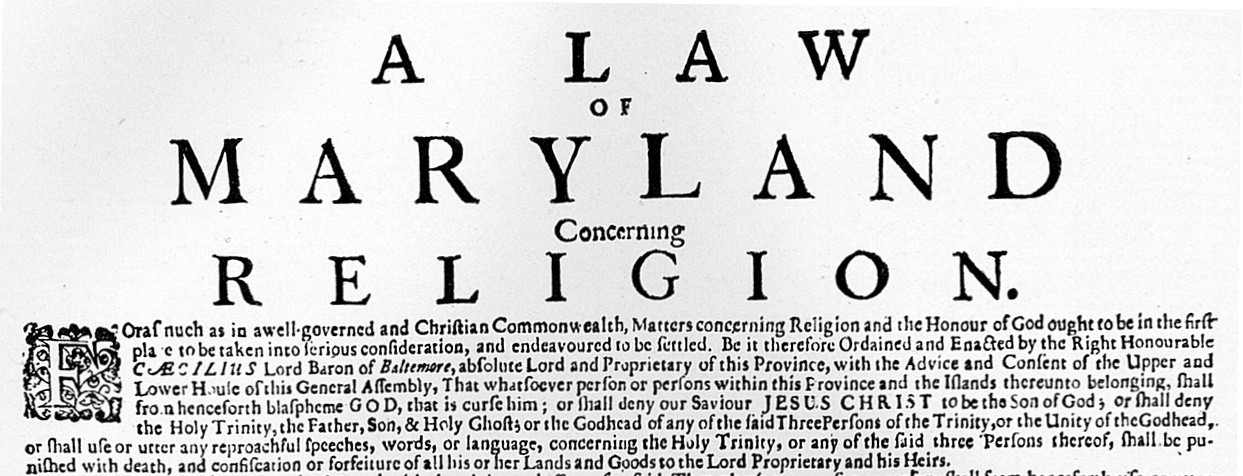
The Maryland Toleration Act, passed in 1649

The Calvert family were Roman Catholics and had founded Maryland as a colony where Catholics and Nonconformist Protestants as well as members of the established Church of England could live together in peace. Cecil Calvert, 2nd Baron Baltimore (1605–1675), had received the proprietorship that was intended for his father, George, who died in 1632 at age 53, shortly before it was granted. Cecil established his colony in Maryland from his home in England, (but sent his younger brother Leonard (1606–1647), as first colonial governor, and as a Roman Catholic continued the legacy of his father by promoting religious tolerance in the colony. He governed Maryland for forty-two years, though he never visited his colony in person.

In 1649, the General Assembly of Maryland, the decade-old colonial legislature passed the Maryland Toleration Act, also known as the "Act Concerning Religion, a law mandating religious tolerance for trinitarian Christians". Passed on September 21, 1649 by the Assembly of the Maryland colony, it was the first law requiring religious tolerance in the British North American colonies. The Calvert family sought enactment of the law to protect Catholic and other Trinitarian Christians who did not conform to the established Church of England. Religious toleration lasted for approximately 40 years until it was revoked during the Protestant Revolution of 1689. From 1689 until 1776, Maryland was officially Anglican.

=== Arrival in Maryland ===
Charles Calvert sailed to Maryland in 1661 as a young man of 24, becoming the first of the Barons Baltimore to take personal charge of the colony. He was appointed deputy governor by his father and, when Cecil Calvert died in 1675, Charles inherited Maryland, becoming governor in his own right. Some time before 1666 he was married to Mary Darnall, daughter of Ralph Darnall, and the first of Calvert's four wives. The Darnall family were wealthy Maryland planters, and also Roman Catholics. Tragically, Mary did not live long; she died in childbirth sometime before 1667.

Charles was not slow to find a new bride. In 1667, he was married a second time, to Jane Lowe (1644–1693/4), the widow of Colonel Henry Sewall of St Mary's County, Maryland, daughter of Vincent Lowe and his wife Anne Cavendish. In late 1667 or early 1668, they had a son, Cecil.

=== Economic problems ===
Calvert's life as governor was aggravated by growing economic problems. From the 1660s onwards, the price of tobacco, the staple crop of Maryland and its chief source of export income, began a long slide, causing economic hardship especially among the poor. In 1666 neighbouring Virginia proposed a "stint" on tobacco growing, a one-year moratorium that would lower supply and so drive up prices. Calvert initially agreed to this plan but came to realize that the burden of the stint would fall chiefly upon his poorest subjects, who comprised "the generality of the province". Eventually he vetoed the bill, much to the disgust of the Virginians, though in the end Nature provided a stint of her own in the form of a hurricane which devastated the 1667 tobacco crop.

=== Religion and politics ===
By the time Charles Calvert became governor, the population of the province had gradually become overwhelmingly Protestant due to immigration. Political power however tended to remain concentrated in the hands of the largely Roman Catholic elite. In spite of this demographic shift away from Catholicism, Calvert attempted to preserve Maryland's Catholic identity. From 1669 to 1689, of 27 men who sat on the Governor's Council, just 8 were Protestant. Most councillors were Catholics, and many were related by blood or marriage to the Calverts, enjoying political patronage and often lucrative offices such as commands in the militia or sinecures in the Land Office.

Much conflict between Calvert and his subjects turned on the question of how far English law should be applied in Maryland, and to what degree the proprietary government might exercise its own prerogative outside of the law. Delegates to the assembly wished to establish the "full force and power" of the law but Calvert, ever protective of his prerogative, insisted that only he and his councillors might decide where and when English law should apply. Such uncertainty could and did permit the charge of arbitrary government.

Calvert acted in various ways to restrain the influence of the Protestant majority. In 1670 he restricted suffrage to men who owned 50 acres (200,000 m^{2}) or more, or held property worth more than 40 pounds. He also restricted election to Maryland's House of Delegates to those who owned at least 1,000 acres (4 km^{2}) of land. In 1676 he directed the voters to return half as many delegates to the assembly, two instead of four. Measures like these might make the assembly easier to manage, but they tended to strain relations between Calvert and his subjects.

=== Slavery ===
One of Calvert's earliest decisions, regarding the legal position of Africans imported into Maryland, would have long-term and baleful consequences. Although the first Africans had been brought to Maryland in 1642, when 13 slaves arrived at St. Mary's City, the first colonial settlement in the region, their legal status was initially unclear and colonial courts tended to rule that a slave who accepted Christian baptism should be freed. In order to protect the rights of their owners, laws began to be passed to clarify the legal position. In 1663 the Assembly ruled that slaves would be enslaved for life, and that the children of slaves should also be enslaved for life, thus perpetuating the institution of slavery for the next 200 years, until its abolition during the American Civil War. However, the impact of such laws would not be felt for some time, as large scale importation of Africans to Maryland would not begin until the 1690s.

=== Religious conflicts ===
In 1675, the elder (second) Lord Baltimore (Cecilius, who planted the colony of Maryland) died, and Charles Calvert, now 38 years old, returned to London in order to be elevated to his barony. His political enemies now took the opportunity of his absence to launch a scathing attack on the proprietarial government, publishing a pamphlet in 1676, titled "A Complaint from Heaven with a Hue and Crye...out of Maryland and Virginia", listing numerous grievances, and in particular complaining of the lack of an established church. Neither was the Church of England happy. An Anglican priest, Rev. John Yeo, wrote scathingly to the Archbishop of Canterbury, complaining that Maryland was "in a deplorable condition" and had become "a sodom of uncleanliness and a pesthouse of iniquity". This was taken sufficiently seriously in London that the Privy Council directed Calvert to respond to the complaints made against him.

Calvert's response to these challenges was defiant. He hanged two of the would-be rebels, and moved to re-assert Maryland's religious diversity. His written response illustrates the difficulties facing his administration; Calvert wrote that Maryland settlers were "Presbyterians, Independents, Anabaptists, and Quakers, those of the Church of England as well as the Romish being the fewest...it would be a most difficult task to draw such persons to consent unto a Law which shall compel them to maintaine ministers of a contrary perswasion to themselves".

=== Conspiracies ===
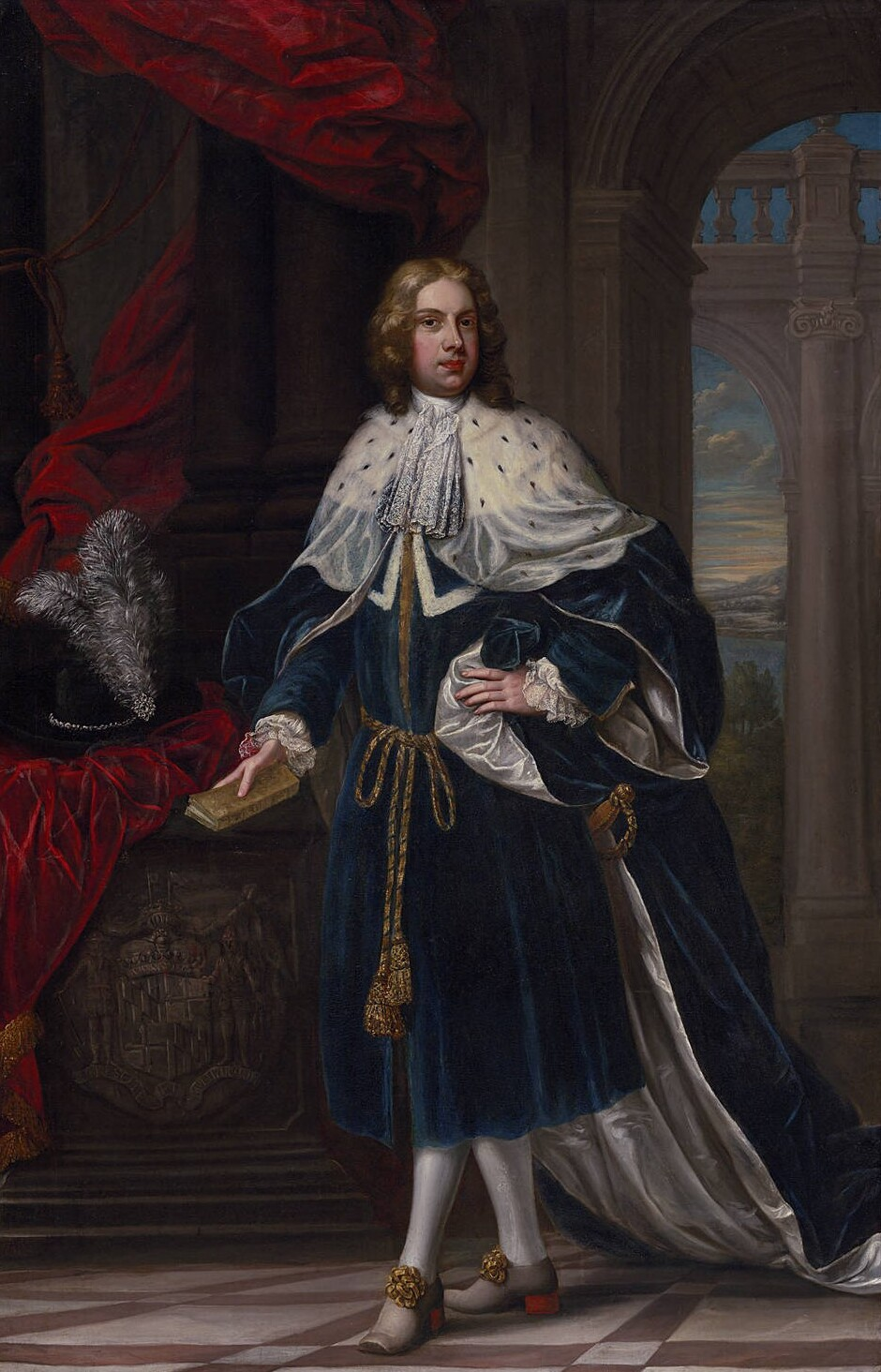
Benedict, Baltimore's son

In 1679, Charles and Jane celebrated a second son, Benedict. But two years later, in 1681, Lord Baltimore once again faced rebellion, led by a former governor of the province Josias Fendall (1657–1660) and John Coode. (Coode would later lead the successful rebellion of 1689.) Fendall was tried, convicted, fined forty thousand pounds of tobacco and exiled, but his co-conspirator Coode successfully escaped retribution.

By this time the political fabric of the province was starting to tear. The governor of Virginia reported that "Maryland is now in torment...and in great danger of falling in pieces". Relations between the governing council and the assembly grew increasingly poor. Underlying much of the rancour was the continued slide in the price of tobacco, which by the 1680s had fallen 50% in 30 years. In 1681 Baltimore also faced personal tragedy; his eldest son and heir, Cecil, died, leaving his second son Benedict as the heir presumptive to the Calvert inheritance.

=== Border conflict with Pennsylvania ===
Adding to his difficulties, Calvert found himself embroiled in a serious conflict over land boundaries to the north with William Penn (1644-1718), engaging in a dispute over the border between Maryland and Pennsylvania. In 1681, King Charles II had granted Penn a substantial but rather vague proprietorship to the north of Maryland. Penn however began building his capital city south of the 40th Parallel, in Maryland territory. Penn and Calvert met twice to negotiate a settlement, but were unable to reach agreement. The dispute would outlast both Calvert and Penn, not being resolved until 1769.

=== Departure for England ===
In 1684, Charles Calvert travelled to England, both to defend himself in the dispute with Penn as well as to answer charges that he favoured Catholics in the colony. He would never return to Maryland.

Calvert left the province in the care of his nephew George Talbot, whom he made acting governor, placing him at the head of the Governor's Council. Unfortunately Talbot proved to be a poor choice, stabbing to death a Royal customs official on board his ship in the Patuxent River, and thereby ensuring that his uncle suffered immediate difficulties on his return to London. Calvert's replacement for Talbot was another Roman Catholic, William Joseph, who would also prove controversial. In November 1688 Joseph set about offending local opinion by lecturing his Maryland subjects on morality, adultery and the divine right of kings, lambasting the colony as "a land full of adulterers".

=== Glorious Revolution in England ===
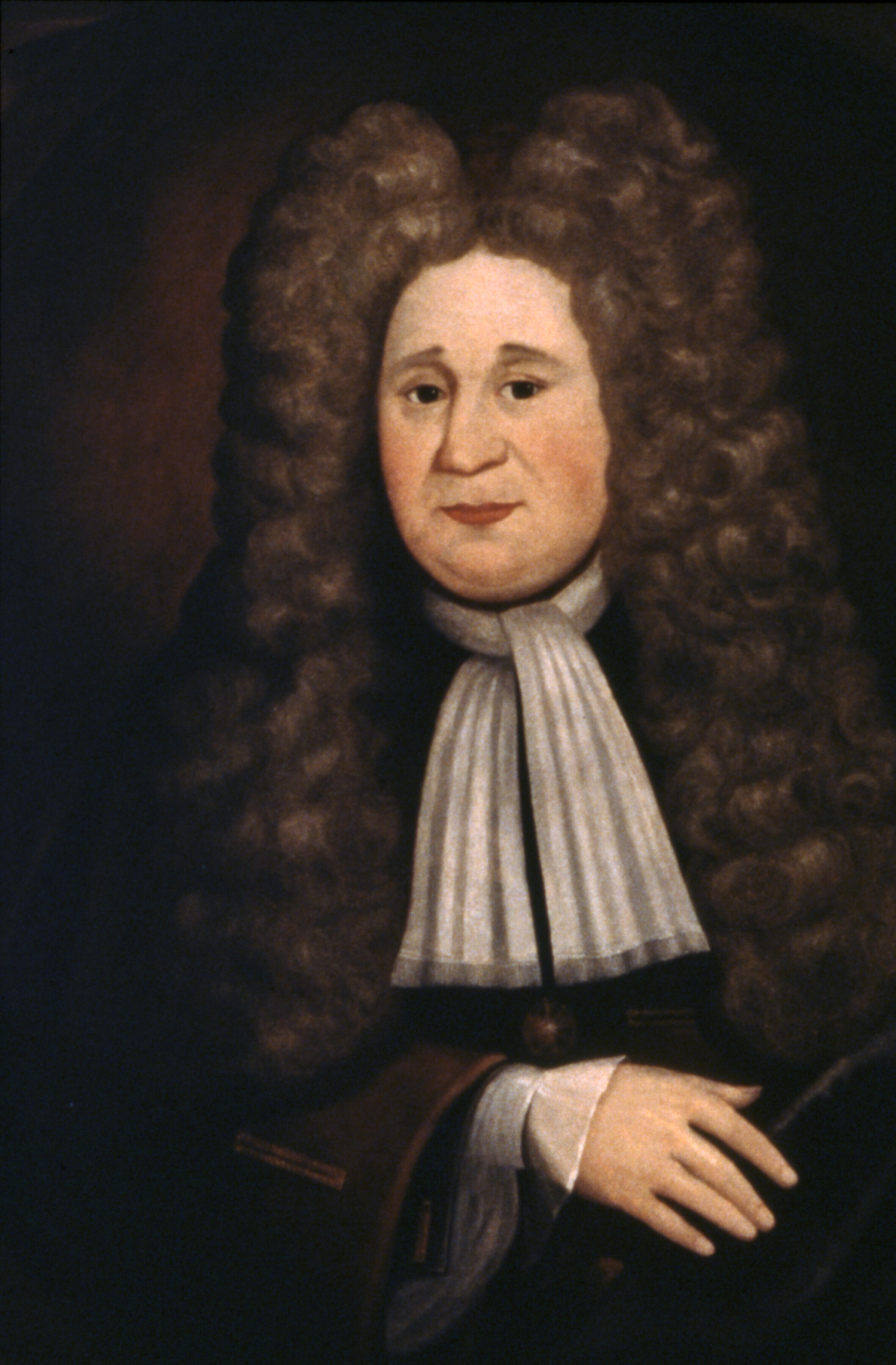
Henry Darnall, who was overthrown in the Protestant Revolution

In England, events now began to move decisively against the Calverts and their political interest. In 1688, the country underwent what would later become known as the Glorious Revolution, during which the Catholic King James II of England was deposed and the Protestant monarchs King William and Mary II of England were installed on the throne. This triumph of the Protestant faction would cause Calvert considerable political difficulties. Sensibly, Calvert moved quickly to support the new regime, sending a messenger to Maryland to proclaim the new King and Queen. Unfortunately for Lord Baltimore, the messenger died during the journey, and a second envoy (if one was ever sent – Calvert would later claim that it was) never arrived.

=== Protestant Revolution in Maryland ===
Meanwhile, Maryland Protestants, by now a substantial majority in the colony, feeding on rumors from England and fearing Popish plots, began to organize rebellion against the proprietary government. Governor Joseph did not improve the situation by refusing to convene the assembly and, ominously, recalling weapons from storage, ostensibly for repair. Protestants, angry at the apparent lack of official support for the new King and Queen, and resentful of the preferment of Catholics like deputy governor Colonel Henry Darnall to official positions of power, began to arm themselves. In the summer of 1689 an army of 700 Puritans led by Colonel John Coode, and calling themselves the Protestant Associators, defeated a proprietarial army led by Colonel Darnall. Darnall, heavily outnumbered, later wrote: "Wee being in this condition and no hope left of quieting the people thus enraged, to prevent effusion of blood, capitulated and surrendered."

After this "Protestant Revolution" in Maryland, The victorious Coode and his Protestants allies set up a new government that outlawed Catholicism; Catholics would thereafter be forced to maintain secret chapels in their home in order to celebrate the Mass. In 1704 an Act was passed "to prevent the growth of Popery in this Province", preventing Catholics from holding political office. Full religious toleration would not be restored in Maryland until the American Revolution, when Darnall's great-grandson Charles Carroll of Carrollton, (1737-1832), arguably the wealthiest Catholic in Maryland, signed the American Declaration of Independence along with others on behalf of the new state in Philadelphia in 1776.

John Coode would remain in power until the new royal governor, Nehemiah Blakiston was appointed on July 27, 1691. Charles Calvert himself would never return to Maryland, and, worse, his family's royal charter to the colony was withdrawn in 1689.

== Later life ==
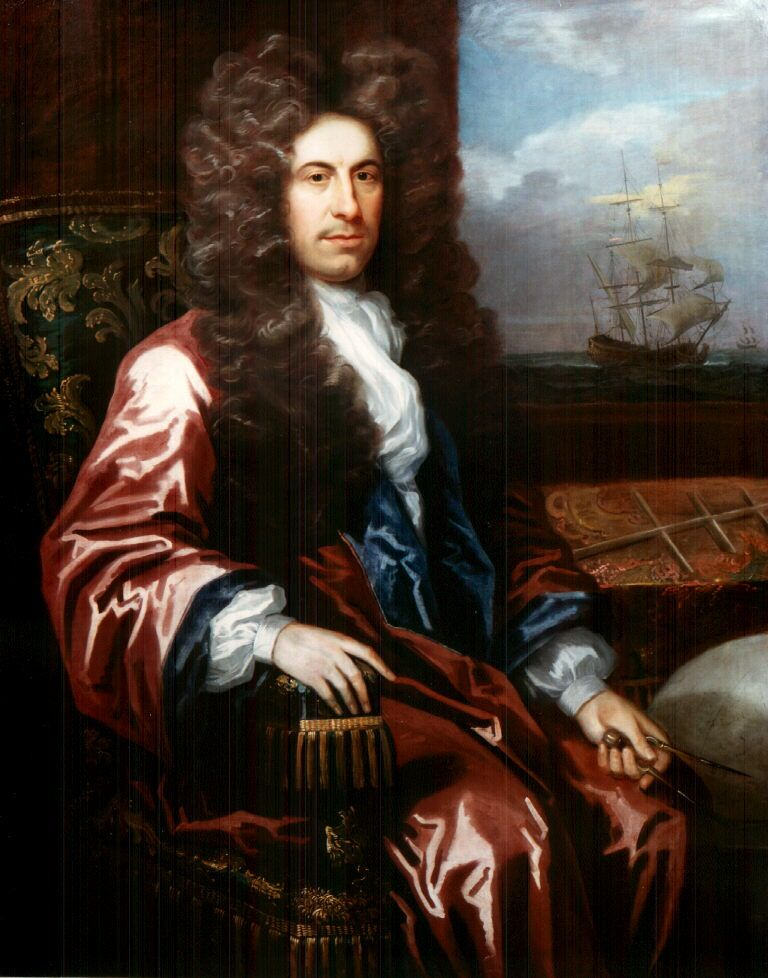
c. 1700 portrait of Baltimore by John Closterman

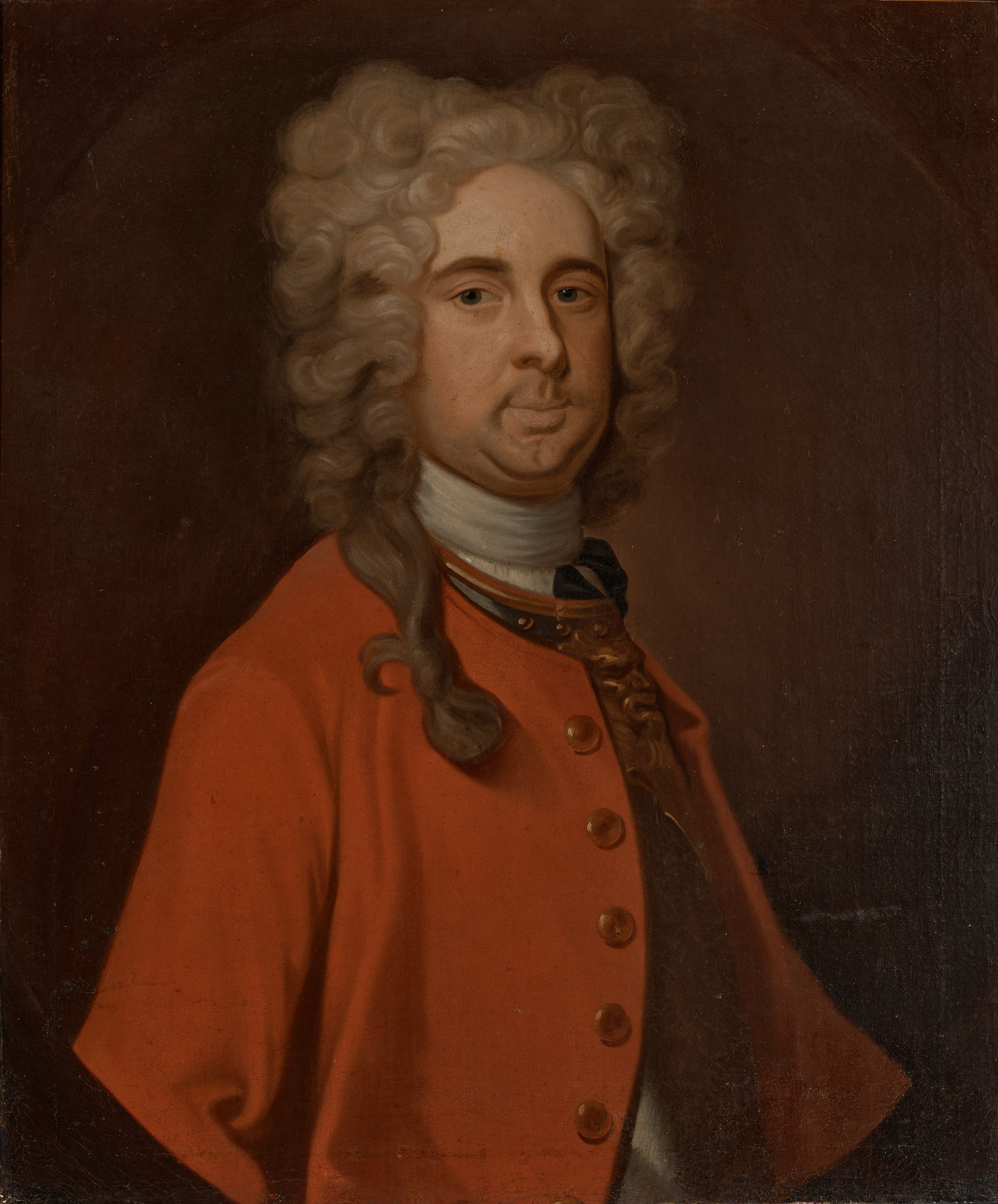
Charles Calvert, likely Baltimore's illegitimate son

Calvert's political difficulties did not end with the loss of Maryland. In 1694, he was named in connection with the Titus Oates plot, although he successfully evaded arrest. In 1696, his fortunes improved; he was made brigadier general, and then in 1704 rose to the rank of major-general.

Calvert's second wife, Jane, died around 1693 or 1694, and Calvert married a third time, to Mary Bankes, some time between 1701 and 1710. His fourth and final marriage was to Margaret Charleton, daughter of Thomas Charleton, in 1712.

Calvert may also have had an illegitimate son, Charles Calvert Lazenby, born in England in 1688, who would grow up to have a career in the army and later become Governor of Maryland in his own right.

Captain Calvert's parents have never been positively identified but it has long been assumed that his father was the 3rd Baron Baltimore. This assumption appears to be supported in scholar Anne Yentsch's book by the fact that Captain Calvert was granted lands by the 3rd Baron Baltimore, which he then exchanged for a military commission. Likewise, the 5th Baron Baltimore, son of Benedict Leonard Calvert Sr., placed his older cousin as governor of the Maryland Province after he assumed the title at the young age of 15. His mother's identity is also unknown but, judging by the Calvert family papers, she appears to have been the Countess Henrietta, also known as "Mother Calvert", who died circa 1728. However, Douglas Richardson's Plantagenet Ancestry: A Study In Colonial And Medieval Families, 2nd Edition, p. 467, does not list Lazenby as an illegitimate child of the 3rd Baron; nor any others.

Calvert's residence in England was his family's estate at Woodcote Park in Surrey. Around 1712, Woodcote was described by Celia Fiennes:

Lord Baltimores in Woodcut Green encompassed with a wall at the entrance, a breast wall with pallisadoes, large courts one within the other, and a back way to the stables where there is a pretty horse pond; the house is old but low, though large run over much ground; as I drove by the side saw broad chimneys on the end and at due distance on the side on both ends the sides of a court which terminated in a building on which there is a lead with railes and barristers.

=== Relations with his son Benedict ===
Charles remained a Roman Catholic, despite the adverse political disadvantages. But his eldest son Benedict Calvert, 4th Baron Baltimore (1679–1715), did not maintain this allegiance. Benedict correctly calculated that the chief impediment to the restoration of his family's title to Maryland was the question of religion. Accordingly, he abandoned Rome and converted to Anglicanism, deciding to "embrace the protestant religion", and gambling that this move would win back his family's lost fortune in the New World. Such a bold move would however come at a high price. Lord Baltimore, furious at his son's conversion, withdrew his annual allowance of £450 and ended his support for his grandchildren's education and maintenance. However, Charles Calvert died in 1715, passing his title, and his claim to Maryland, to his son Benedict. Charles is buried in the churchyard of St Pancras Old Church in London.

== Legacy ==
Upon his father's death, Charles' son, Benedict Calvert, 4th Baron Baltimore, petitioned King George I, (1660–1727), for the restoration of his family's proprietarial title to Maryland. Unfortunately, before the king could rule on the petition, Benedict died, just two months after his father, passing on his title in turn to his son Charles.

On May 15, 1715, Charles Calvert, 5th Baron Baltimore soon found himself, at age sixteen, in the fortunate position of having had his family's proprietarial title to Maryland restored by the King. In 1721, he came of age and assumed personal control of the Colony, which would remain under the control of the Calvert family until 1776 and the American Revolution. Charles County, Maryland, was named after him.

Charles Calvert's very large full-length portrait, along with those of all the other Lords Baltimore (collected by philanthropist Hugh Young), all still hang today in the skylighted Great Hall of the central Enoch Pratt Free Library on Cathedral Street in downtown Baltimore, the city that bears his family name (along with several others usually with the prefix of "New" attached across America), along with frequent historical and ceremonial commemorations of the colonial proprietors.

== See also ==
- Baron Baltimore
- Colonial families of Maryland
- List of colonial governors of Maryland
- Province of Maryland

== Notes ==
Government offices
Preceded by The 2nd Lord Baltimore	Proprietor of Maryland; 1675–1689	Vacant Royal control Title next held by The 5th Lord Baltimore
Peerage of Ireland
Preceded by Cecil Calvert	Baron Baltimore; 1675–1715	Succeeded by Benedict Leonard Calvert
