= Benedict Calvert, 4th Baron Baltimore =

British colonial administrator and politician

The Right Honourable The Lord Baltimore
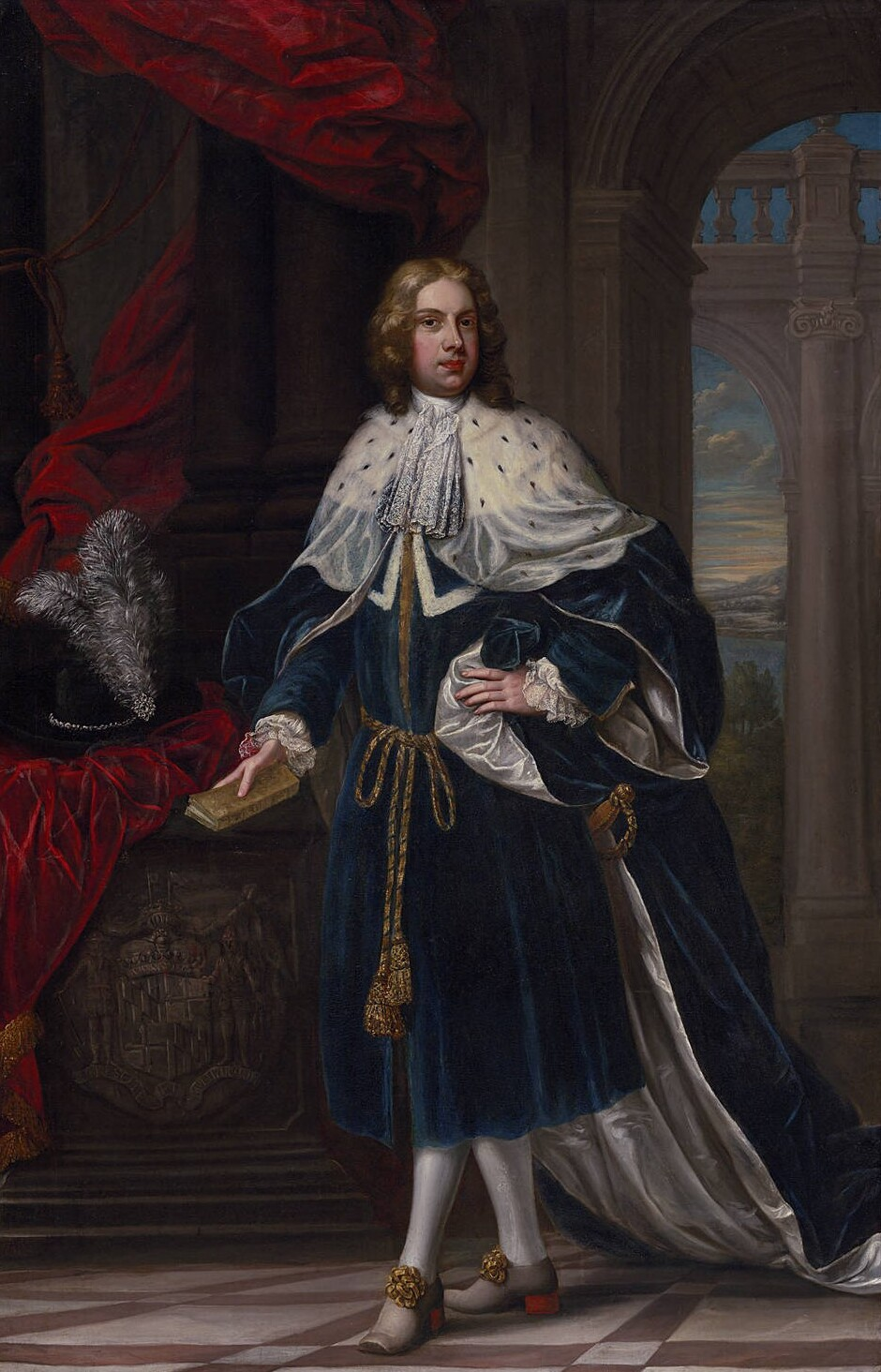
- c. 1715 portrait

10th Proprietary-Governor of Maryland
- In office 1684–1688
- Preceded by: Charles Calvert, 3rd Baron Baltimore
- Succeeded by: William Joseph

Personal details
- Born: 21 March 1679 England
- Died: 16 April 1715 (aged 36) England
- Spouse: Charlotte Lee, Lady Baltimore
- Children: Charles Calvert, 5th Baron Baltimore; Benedict Leonard Calvert; Edward Henry Calvert; Charlotte Calvert; Jane Calvert; Cecil Calvert
- Parent(s): Charles Calvert, 3rd Baron Baltimore; Jane Lowe
- Occupation: Politician

Benedict Leonard Calvert, 4th Baron Baltimore (21 March 1679 – 16 April 1715) was a British colonial administrator and politician who represented Harwich in the House of Commons of Great Britain from 1714 to 1715. He was the second son of Charles Calvert, 3rd Baron Baltimore and Jane Lowe, and became his father's heir upon the death of his elder brother Cecil in 1681.

The 3rd Lord Baltimore was a devout Roman Catholic, and had lost his title to the Province of Maryland shortly after the events of the Glorious Revolution in 1688, when the Protestant monarchs William III and Mary II acceded to the British throne. Benedict Calvert made strenuous attempts to have his family's title to Maryland restored by renouncing Roman Catholicism and joining the Church of England.

In February 1715, Benedict became the 4th Baron Baltimore upon the death of his father, and he immediately petitioned King George I for the restoration of Maryland to his control. However, before the King could rule on the petition, Baltimore died aged 36, outliving his father by just two months. Shortly afterwards the King restored the title to Maryland to Calvert's young son Charles Calvert, 5th Baron Baltimore.

== Early life and exile ==
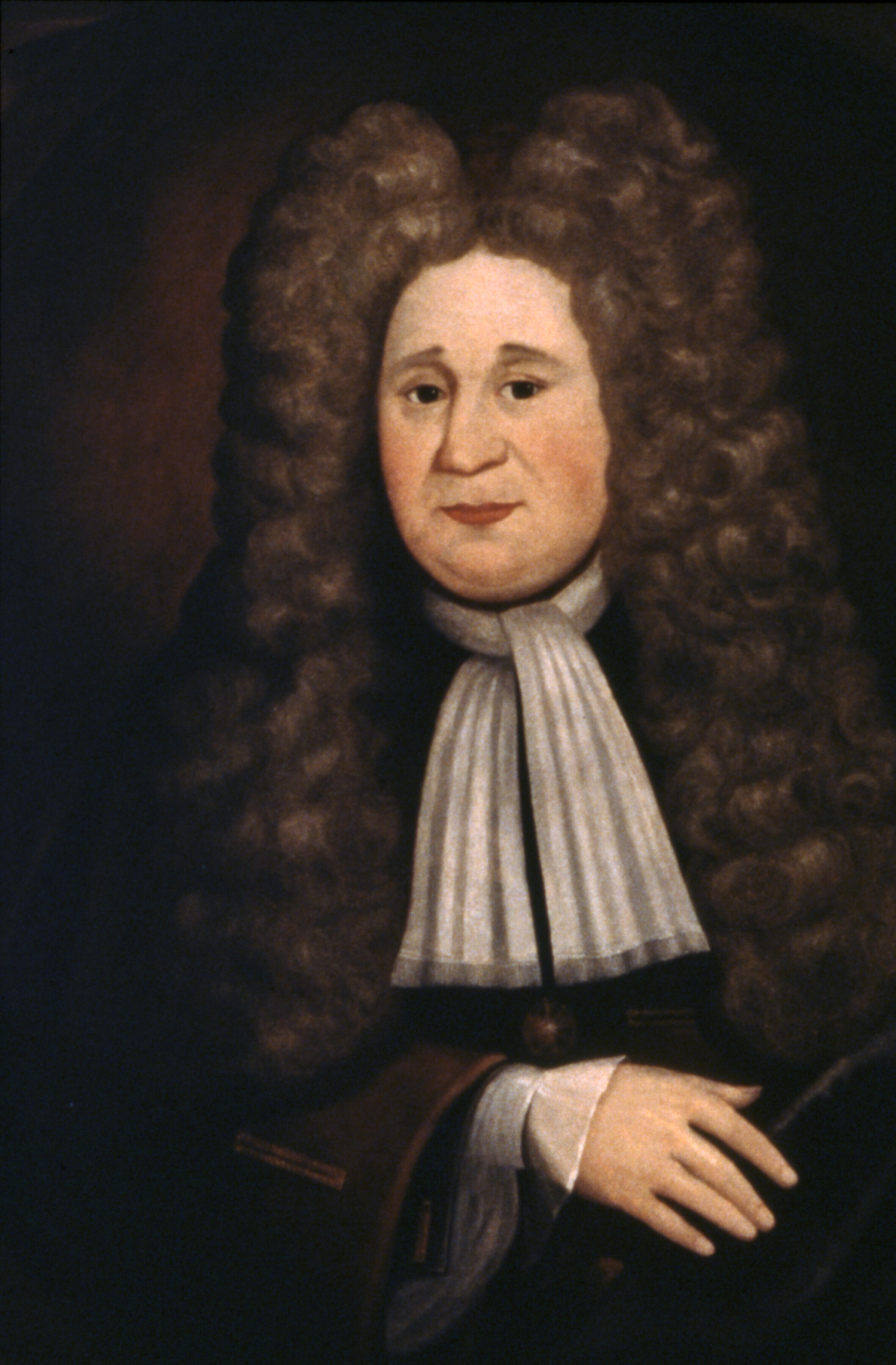
Henry Darnall

Benedict Calvert served as Governor of Maryland on behalf of his father from 1684 to 1688. Since he was just five years old at the time, this appointment was a purely honorary one, with the real work of governorship being carried out by his deputy, Henry Darnall.

Like his father, Benedict's Catholicism caused him political difficulties. While still a boy he served as a cavalry officer in the regiment of James Cecil, 4th Earl of Salisbury; Salisbury was appointed a Gentleman of the Bedchamber to the Catholic King James II in 1688 and he duly converted to Roman Catholicism and served the king as Colonel of a regiment of horse.

Unfortunately, Salisbury's timing could not have been worse. The King was soon overthrown by the Glorious Revolution of October to December 1688, and both Salisbury and Calvert were outlawed by the new Protestant regime.

Worse was to come. The events following the Glorious Revolution also cost the Roman Catholic Calverts their rule in Maryland, which in 1688 became a Royal Colony, following a Puritan revolt known as the Protestant Revolution.

Benedict Calvert's name was entered at Gray's Inn in 1690, but again his religion proved an impediment to his career. and he went into exile in St Germain, France, where he remained for 10 years.

== Return to England ==
In 1698 Calvert was able to secure a license to return to England, and on 2 January 1699 he married the twenty-year-old Lady Charlotte Lee, daughter of the 1st Earl of Lichfield and Lady Charlotte FitzRoy, the illegitimate daughter of King Charles II.

The couple had seven children, all of whom were raised in the Catholic faith, but the union was not a happy one, and the couple separated in 1705. In 1711 Calvert petitioned for a divorce from his wife on the grounds of her "open adultery", but the petition was unsuccessful and the divorce was not granted.

== Religion and the Restoration of Maryland to Calvert control ==
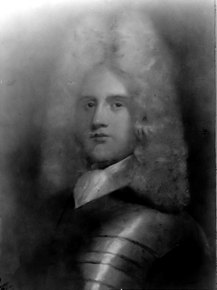
Benedict Leonard Calvert, 4th Baron Baltimore

Coat of Arms of the Barons Baltimore

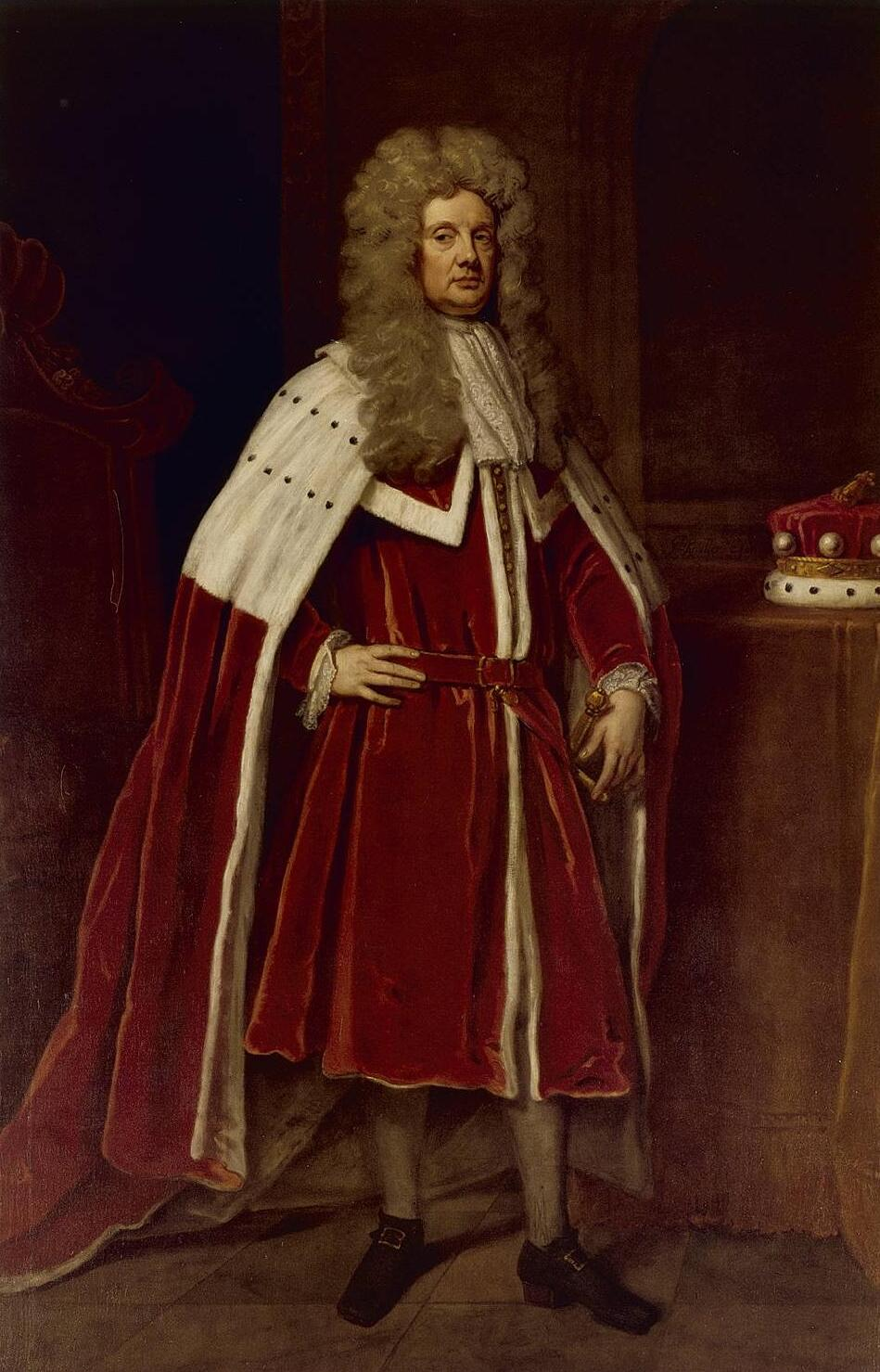
Benedict's devoutly Catholic father, Charles Calvert, 3rd Baron Baltimore, was furious at his son's conversion to Anglicanism.

Benedict Calvert correctly calculated that the chief impediment to the restoration of his family's title to Maryland was the question of religion. Towards the end of 1713 he began to make overtures to Robert Harley, 1st Earl of Oxford and Earl Mortimer, informing Oxford of his:

inclinations...to embrace the Protestant religion, which I have become hitherto deterred from by the apprehensions that my father would withdraw my sustinance.

Accordingly, he converted to Anglicanism in 1713, gambling that this move would win back his family's lost fortune in the New World. Such a drastic move came at a cost, however. Benedict's devoutly Catholic father Charles Calvert, 3rd Baron Baltimore, furious at his son's apostasy, withdrew his son's annual allowance of £450 and ended his support for his grandchildren's education and maintenance. Fortunately Benedict was able to persuade the Crown to grant him an allowance of £300 a year, and Queen Anne even acceded to his nomination of John Hart as governor of the province, on condition that Hart would share with Calvert £500 per annum out of his profits from the office.

For Calvert, the political benefits associated with his new religion came quickly. He was elected to the House of Commons as Member of Parliament for Harwich from 1714 to 1715, though he was not listed in any division lists, and was not an active member.

On 1 August 1714 Queen Anne died, leaving the Calverts with a new king and a new court to persuade of the merits of their family's claim to Maryland.

== Petition to George I ==
On 2 February 1715 Calvert reaffirmed his devotion to the Anglican faith and proclaimed his loyalty to the new Protestant king George I. Two weeks later the old Lord Baltimore died, aged 78, and Benedict succeeded him to become the 4th Baron Baltimore, immediately petitioning King George I for the restoration of Maryland to his control. However, before the King could rule on the petition, Baltimore himself died, outliving his father by just two months. Shortly afterwards, on 15 May 1715, the King restored the title to Maryland to Benedict's son, the fifteen-year-old 5th Baron Baltimore.

== Family ==
Calvert married on 2 January 1699 Lady Charlotte Lee, daughter of the Edward Lee, 1st Earl of Lichfield, and his wife, Lady Charlotte Fitzroy, an illegitimate daughter of Charles II of England by Barbara Villiers, 1st Duchess of Cleveland. He and his wife had seven children, including:

- Charles Calvert, 5th Baron Baltimore, 18th Proprietor Governor of Maryland (29 September 1699 – 24 April 1751), married on 20 July 1730 Mary Janssen (died Chaillot, Paris, 25 March 1770), daughter of Sir Theodore Janssen, 1st Baronet, and wife Williamza or Williamsa Henley.
- Edward Henry Calvert (Epsom, 31 August 1701 - Annapolis, Calvert House, 1730), held office of Commissary General and President of the Council of Maryland. Married in 1726 Margaret Lee (born 1705), but had no children.
- Benedict Leonard Calvert (1700–1732), Governor of the Maryland colony from 1727 through 1731, appointed by his brother, Charles Calvert, 5th Baron Baltimore. His health was poor and he died of tuberculosis on 1 June 1732 on his passage home to England.
- Cecil Calvert (6 November 1702 - 1765)
- Charlotte Calvert (born 6 November 1702, died December 1744), married Thomas Brerewood, by whom she had a son, Francis Brerewood. (Her father-in-law Thomas Brerewood owned My Lady's Manor, in Maryland.)
- Jane Calvert (Epsom, 19 July 1703 - July 1778), married 4 May 1720 John Hyde (1695–1746), with whom she had many children.
- Barbara Calvert (1704–1704)
- Anne Calvert

Their descendants included the children of Robert E. Lee through Benedict Swingate Calvert, an illegitimate son of the 5th Baron Calvert. Benedict's daughter, Eleanor married John Parke Custis, a stepson of George Washington. Swingate's mother may have been Melusina von der Schulenburg, Countess of Walsingham, an illegitimate daughter of George I of Great Britain, by his mistress, Melusine von der Schulenburg, Duchess of Kendal.

== Legacy ==
Benedict Calvert had arranged for his son Charles to be raised a Protestant, and in 1721 the young Charles came of age and assumed control of the colony of Maryland, which remained under the control of the Calvert family until 1776. However, Charles Calvert, like his father, had to embrace the Anglican faith to retain authority over his family's province. The Calvert family's dream of a haven in the Americas for Roman Catholics was at an end, and it took an American Revolution and the overthrow of the Calvert proprietary government to restore religious tolerance to Maryland.

Benedict's portrait, along with those of the other Barons Baltimore, still hangs today in the Enoch Pratt Free Library in Baltimore, the city that bears his family name.

== See also ==
- Baron Baltimore
- List of colonial governors of Maryland
- Province of Maryland
- Proprietary colony

== Notes ==
Parliament of Great Britain
Preceded by Carew Harvey Mildmay; Thomas Heath	Member of Parliament for Harwich; 1714–1715; With: Carew Harvey Mildmay	Succeeded by Sir Philip Parker-a-Morley-Long, Bt; Thomas Heath
Peerage of Ireland
Preceded by Charles Calvert	Baron Baltimore; 1715	Succeeded by Charles Calvert
