= Henry Darnall II =

Colonial Maryland planter (1682–1737)

- Born: 1682; Maryland
- Died: 1759 (aged 76–77)
- Occupation: Planter
- Spouse(s): Anne Digges, Elizabeth Lowe
- Children: Henry Darnall III, Eleanor Darnall Carroll, Susanna Darnall, Anne Darnall, Henrietta Maria Darnall, Nicholas Lowe Darnall, Richard Darnall
- Parents: Henry Darnall (father); Eleanor Hatton Brooke Darnall (mother)

Henry Darnall II (1682-1759) was a wealthy Roman Catholic planter in Colonial Maryland. He was the son of the politician and planter Henry Darnall, who was the Proprietary Agent of Charles Calvert, 3rd Baron Baltimore, and served for a time as Deputy Governor of the Province. During the Protestant Revolution of 1689, Henry Darnall I's proprietarial army was defeated by the Puritan army of Colonel John Coode, and he was stripped of his numerous colonial offices. After his father's death, Henry Darnall II did not enjoy political power in Maryland, but he remained wealthy thanks to his family's extensive estates. He married twice, fathering many children. His eldest son Henry Darnall III (c1702-c1783) inherited the bulk of what remained of his estates, and one of his grandchildren, Daniel Carroll, would become one of the Founding Fathers of the United States. A small portion of Darnall's former property, now called Darnall's Chance, can still be visited today.

== Early life ==
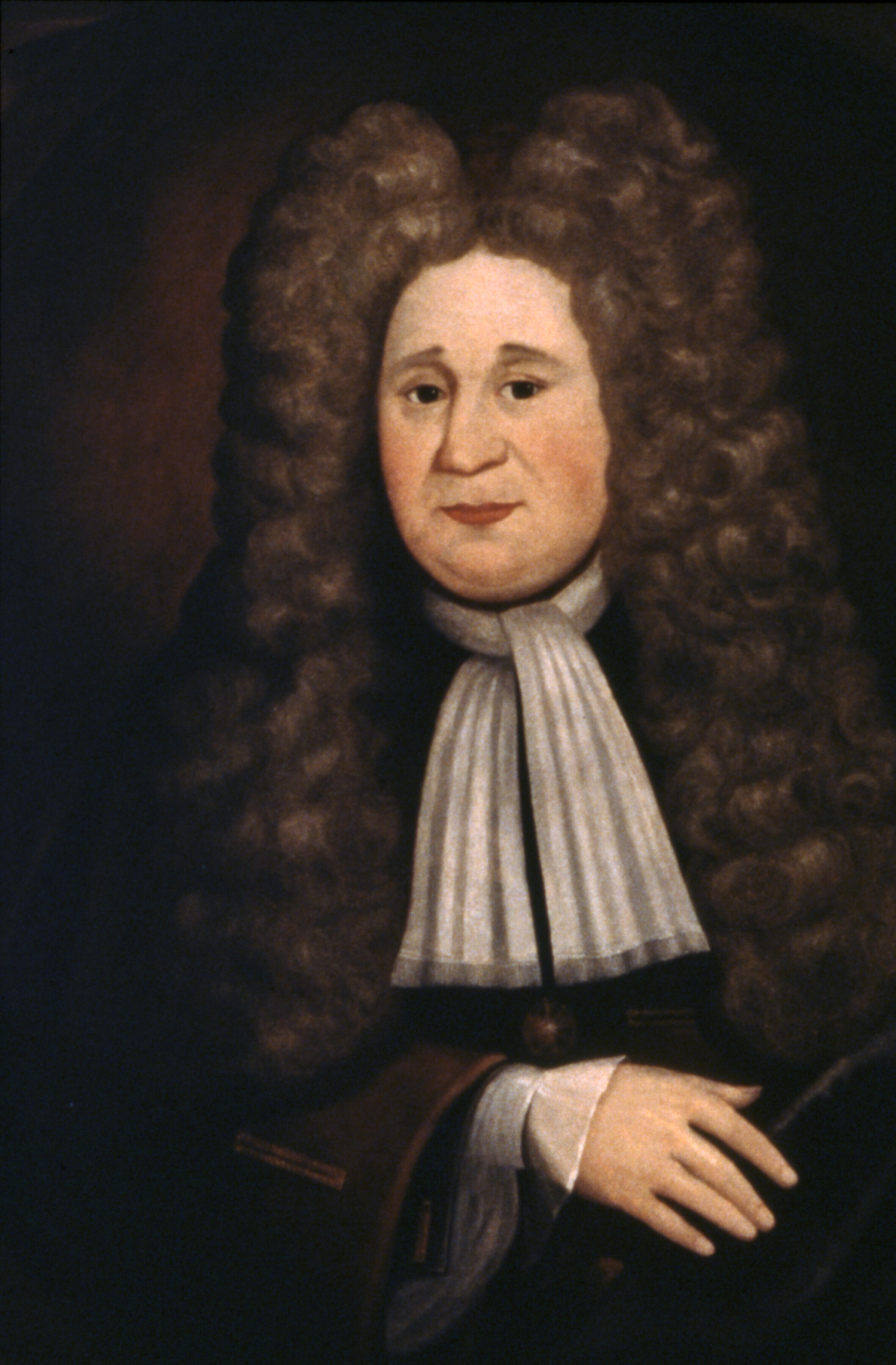
Darnall's father, Henry Darnall

Henry Darnall II was born in 1682 in Maryland, the son of the wealthy Roman Catholic planter and politician Henry Darnall (1645 – 17 June 1711) and his wife Eleanor Hatton Brooke (1642–1725). During the Protestant Revolution of 1689 Darnall was defeated in battle by the Puritan John Coode, who seized power in the Province and barred Roman Catholics from holding public office.

== Career ==
Henry Darnall I died in 1711, leaving his eldest son the bulk of his extensive estates. However, being a Roman Catholic, Henry Darnall II could not hold public office in Maryland. Worse, despite being born to great wealth, by the 1720s Henry Darnall II was in financial trouble, and sometime between 1727 and 1730 he had sold much of his property, including 6,700 acres of His Lordship's Kindness. In 1729 Henry Darnall II transferred around 1,500 acres of land to his son, Henry Darnall III, including 300 acres of His Lordship's Kindness.

== Family life ==
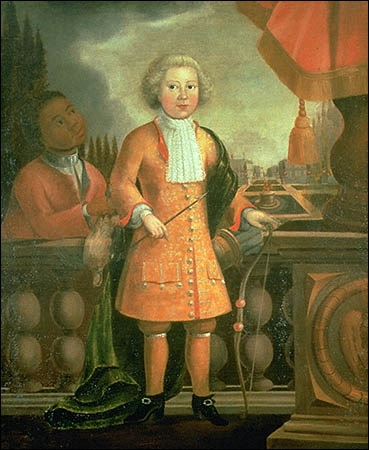
Henry Darnall III, aged around 8, by Justus Engelhardt Kühn

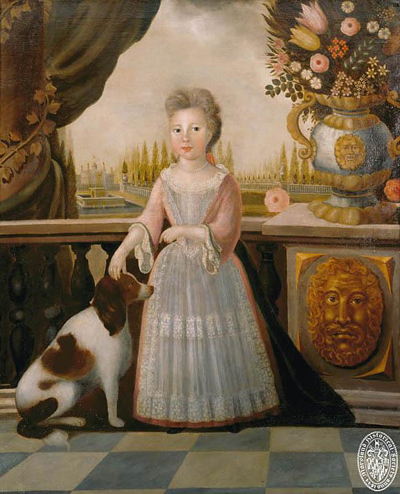
Eleanor Darnall painted by Justus Engelhardt Kühn, circa 1710

Henry Darnall II married twice. In 1702 he married Anne Digges, daughter of William Digges, born around 1685 in Prince George's County, Maryland. They had two children.

- Henry Darnall III, was born in 1702 in Prince George's County, Maryland
- Eleanor Darnall Carroll (1703-1796), married Daniel Carroll, of Upper Marlboro, Maryland, in about 1727. Daniel Carroll was a politician and wealthy planter; their son Daniel Carroll would become one of the Founding Fathers of the United States.

In around 1710 he commissioned the painter Justus Engelhardt Kühn, the earliest known professional artist to work in the Middle Atlantic colonies, to paint portraits of his two children.

Henry Darnall's second marriage was to Elizabeth Lowe (born c1702) in about 1720 in St. Mary's Co., Maryland.

The couple had six children

- Susanna Darnall (b 1723 in Prince George, Md.)
- Anne Darnall, born around 1728
- Henrietta Maria Darnall, born around 1732
- Nicholas Lowe Darnall, born around 1733–37, deponent in the case of Mahoney v Ashton
- Richard Darnall, was born around 1740 in Portland Manor, Anne Arundel County, Maryland. Richard inherited from his father almost 1,000 acres of land, part of Portland Manor, as well as "300 pounds sterling and negroes; and also 20 head of cattle; 20 head of sheep; 20 head of hogs and 5 work horses". Richard Darnall was a deponent in the case of Mahoney v Ashton.
- Robert Darnall, married a wealthy widow Sarah Ryder Nevett Fishwick and purchased his father's former estate, then known as Poplar Hill, from the Carroll family, on March 6, 1773. The couple had no children. Robert Darnall built the mansion known as His Lordship's Kindness, which still stands today.

== Death and legacy ==
Henry Darnall II died in 1759, aged around 77. A small portion of Darnall's former property, now called Darnall's Chance, can still be visited today. No portrait of him survives.

== See also ==
- History of Maryland
- Colonial families of Maryland
