= Darnall (disambiguation) =

Darnall is an electoral ward in City of Sheffield, England.

Darnall may also refer to:

== People ==
- Brig. Gen. Carl Rogers Darnall, MD, developer of chlorination of drinking water
- Henry Darnall (1645–1711), Maryland planter
- Philip Darnall (born 1604), English barrister

== Places ==
South Africa

- Darnall, KwaZulu-Natal, a town in South Africa

United Kingdom

- Darnall (ward), a ward of Sheffield

United States

- Darnall Hall (A Georgetown University first-year undergraduate residence hall in Washington, DC.)
- Darnall Place (Poolesville, Maryland), listed on the NRHP in Maryland
- Darnall's Chance (Upper Marlboro, Maryland), listed on the NRHP in Maryland
- Darnall, San Diego, California (A neighborhood in the mid-city region of San Diego, California.)
- Carl R. Darnall Army Medical Center (formerly Darnall Army Community Hospital), Fort Hood, Killeen, Texas
