= John Coode (Maryland politician) =

American politician (died 1709)

1st Leader of the Protestant Associators of Maryland
- In office 1689–1690
- Preceded by: William Joseph (Proprietary Governors)
- Succeeded by: Nehemiah Blakiston

Personal details
- Born: c. 1648 Penryn, Cornwall, Kingdom of England
- Died: February or March 1709
- Profession: Colonial governor

John Coode (c. 1648 in Cornwall – February or March 1709) is best known for leading a rebellion that overthrew Maryland's colonial government in 1689. He participated in four separate uprisings and briefly served as Maryland's governor (1689–1691) as the 1st Leader of the Protestant Associators.

== Biography ==
Coode was born in Penryn, Cornwall, Kingdom of England about 1648, to a wealthy Cornish family. He attended Oxford University when he was 16 years old. Coode and his father had a falling out the year before, as young Coode was said to be behaving "sinfully." In 1668 Coode became an Anglican priest. In 1672, he journeyed to Maryland.

Coode served as a minister briefly in the colony, but soon renounced his priesthood in order to marry Susannah Slye. Susannah’s father, Thomas Gerrard, was an important figure in the colony, but had his grievances towards the ruling Calvert family. This relationship helped influence Coode's growing disfavor towards the Maryland government.

After his marriage to Susannah, Coode became involved in the affairs of the Colony. Over the next few years, he was appointed a captain of the militia, a justice in Saint Mary's County, and elected to the Maryland Assembly.

In 1681, Coode took part in a rebellion against the government. It is not known exactly what role he played in this plot, but after its ensuing failure, he was arrested along with former Maryland governor, Josias Fendall (ca. 1628-1687). Coode was later freed on bail, but he was removed from office and viewed as a dissident of the Calverts. Charles Calvert described both Fendall and Coode as "rank Baconists", comparing both men with the 1676 rebellion which had caused great disruption in neighbouring Virginia. Fendall was banished from Maryland, but Coode escaped punishment.

=== Protestant Revolution of 1689 ===
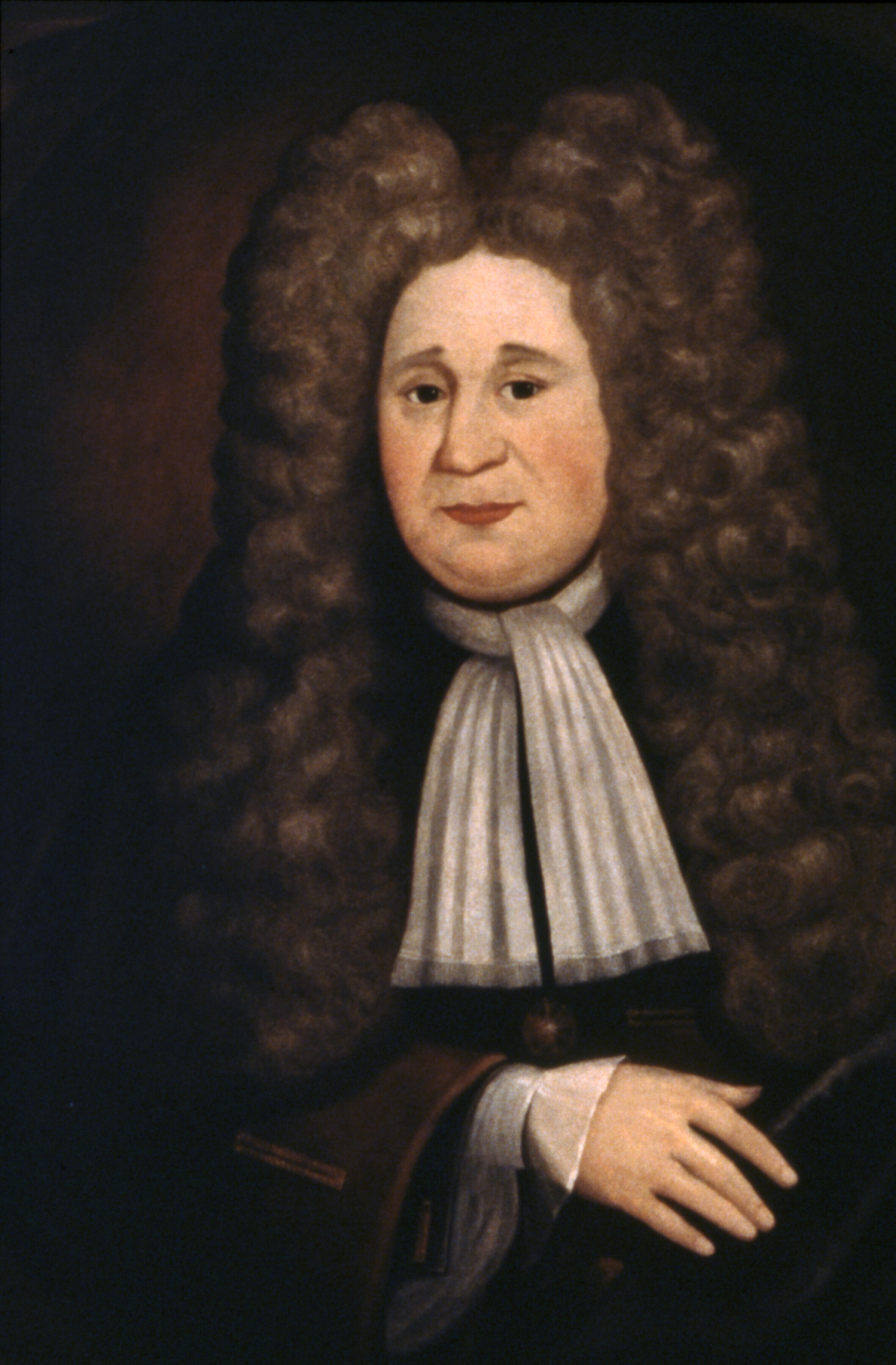
Deputy Governor Henry Darnall, who was overthrown by Coode's rebellion

In 1689, Coode planned another rebellion. An increasing number of Protestants had been moving to Maryland and they began to resent the fact that most political offices were held by Catholics or other close friends of the Calverts. Many Protestants were also upset because Maryland's government had not yet recognized the new Protestant king and queen of England, William III and Mary II, who had seized power from the Catholic King James II in the Glorious Revolution of 1688.

In April 1689, John Coode helped lead "An association in arms, for the defence of the Protestant religion, and for asserting the right of King William and Queen Mary to the Province of Maryland and all the English dominions." Coode raised an army against Maryland's Catholic leaders, which was helped by a rumor he spread warning that the Catholics had invited the native tribes to come and kill the Protestants.

Coode's army of 700 men attacked the state house, a symbol of the proprietary government's authority and home to the colony's records. His army then marched into Saint Mary's City and forced the council to surrender power to them, defeating a proprietarial army led by Colonel Henry Darnall. Darnall later wrote: "Wee being in this condition and no hope left of quieting the people thus enraged, to prevent effusion of blood, capitulated and surrendered." The victorious Coode and his Puritans set up a new government that outlawed both Catholicism and Anglicanism, and Darnall was deprived of all his official positions.

Coode was now in control of the colony, and on August 1, 1689, assumed the responsibility of the government under the title 'Commander-in-Chief'. He remained in power until the new royal governor, Nehemiah Blakiston was appointed on July 27, 1691. For a while, Coode participated in the new government, but he again became dissatisfied and would participate in two more uprisings against the colonial leadership.

In 1699, he was accused of speaking out against the Christian faith and was put on trial for blasphemy. A jury found him guilty and sentenced him to pay a 20-pound sterling fine and to be bored through the tongue with a red hot iron. However, the governor at the time, Nathanial Blakiston, pardoned him in respect for his past service in the rebellion of 1689.

Coode remained popular with the residents of Maryland who attempted to elect him to the Assembly, but the council used the fact that he had once been a priest to keep him out of the government. He spent the remainder of his life outside of the colony's politics. He died in February or March 1709.

== See also ==
- Protestant Revolution (Maryland)

Political offices
Preceded by William Joseph (Proprietary Governor)	Leader of the Protestant Associators (Governor) of Maryland; 1689–1690	Succeeded by Nehemiah Blakiston
