= Henry Darnall III =

Colonial Maryland planter (1703–1787)

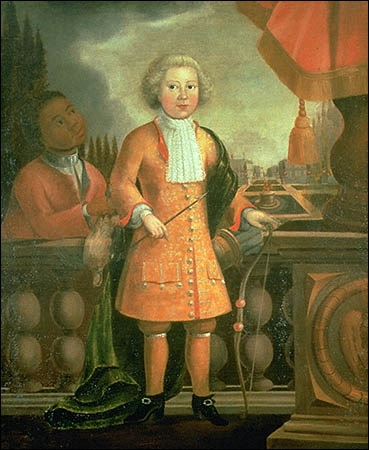
Henry Darnall III, aged around 8, by Justus Engelhardt Kühn

Henry Darnall III (c. 1702 – c. 1783) was a wealthy planter in Colonial Maryland. He was the son of the politician and planter Henry Darnall II, and the grandson of Henry Darnall who was the Proprietary Agent of Charles Calvert, 3rd Baron Baltimore (1605–1675), and served for a time as Deputy Governor of the Province. Henry Darnall III converted to Anglicanism and entered politics at a time when the Calvert family had regained their proprietary colony, having lost it during the Protestant Revolution of 1689. Darnall received much criticism for his faith and was accused of being a secret Catholic. Worse, in 1761 he was accused of embezzling almost £1,000 thanks to his position as Naval Officer of the colony, and was forced to flee Maryland for Europe in order to avoid being placed on trial.

== Early life and career ==
Henry Darnall III was born in 1702, the eldest son of Henry Darnall II and his first wife Anne Digges. Henry Darnall III would go on to serve the colonial government in a number of offices. He served as Chief Naval Officer of Prince George's County from 1755 to 1761. He was Receiver of the Rents for the Lord Proprietary, and Attorney General from 1751 to 1756. In order to hold these offices he converted to the Anglican Church, though the rest of his family remained Roman Catholic, for which he received much criticism.

In 1761 Darnall III was accused of embezzling almost £1,000 thanks to his position as Naval Officer of the colony, and was forced to flee Maryland for Europe in order to avoid being placed on trial.

== Family life ==
Henry Darnall III married Anne Talbot, the niece of George Talbot, 14th Earl of Shrewsbury. They had a number of children, including

- Henry Darnall IV, who was born in 1725 in Prince George's County, Maryland.
- Mary Darnall born about 1732 in Prince George's Co., Maryland,
- Robert Darnall born in Prince George's Co., Maryland.

== Death and legacy ==
A small portion of Darnall's former property, now called Darnall's Chance, can still be visited today.

== See also ==
- History of Maryland
- Colonial families of Maryland
