= His Lordship's Kindness =

Historic house in Maryland, United States

- U.S. National Register of Historic Places
- U.S. National Historic Landmark
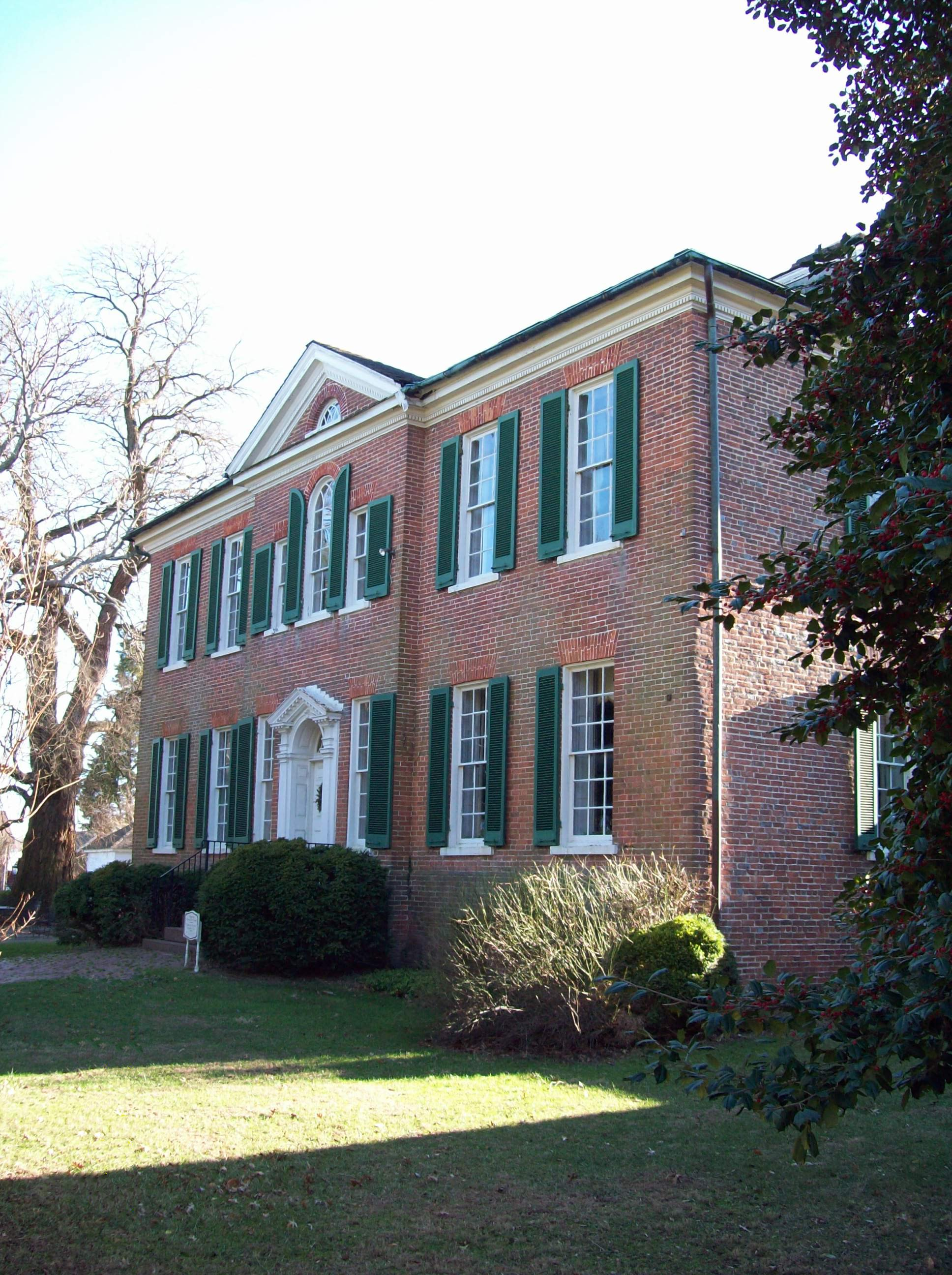
- His Lordship's Kindness - North Front, December 2008

- Location within Maryland Location within the United States
- Location: 3.5 miles northwest of Rosaryville off Rosaryville Rd., near Rosaryville, Maryland
- Coordinates: 38°46′44″N 76°50′34″W
- Area: 150 acres (61 ha)
- Built: 1786
- Architectural style: Georgian
- NRHP reference No.: 70000853

Significant dates
- Added to NRHP: April 15, 1970
- Designated NHL: April 15, 1970

His Lordship's Kindness, also known as Poplar Hill, is a historic plantation estate on Woodyard Road east of Clinton, Maryland. It was built in the 1780s for Prince George's County planter Robert Darnall. The five-part Georgian mansion retains a number of subsidiary buildings including a slave's hospital and a dovecote. The property is now operated as a museum by a local nonprofit preservation group. It was designated a National Historic Landmark in 1970.

== History ==
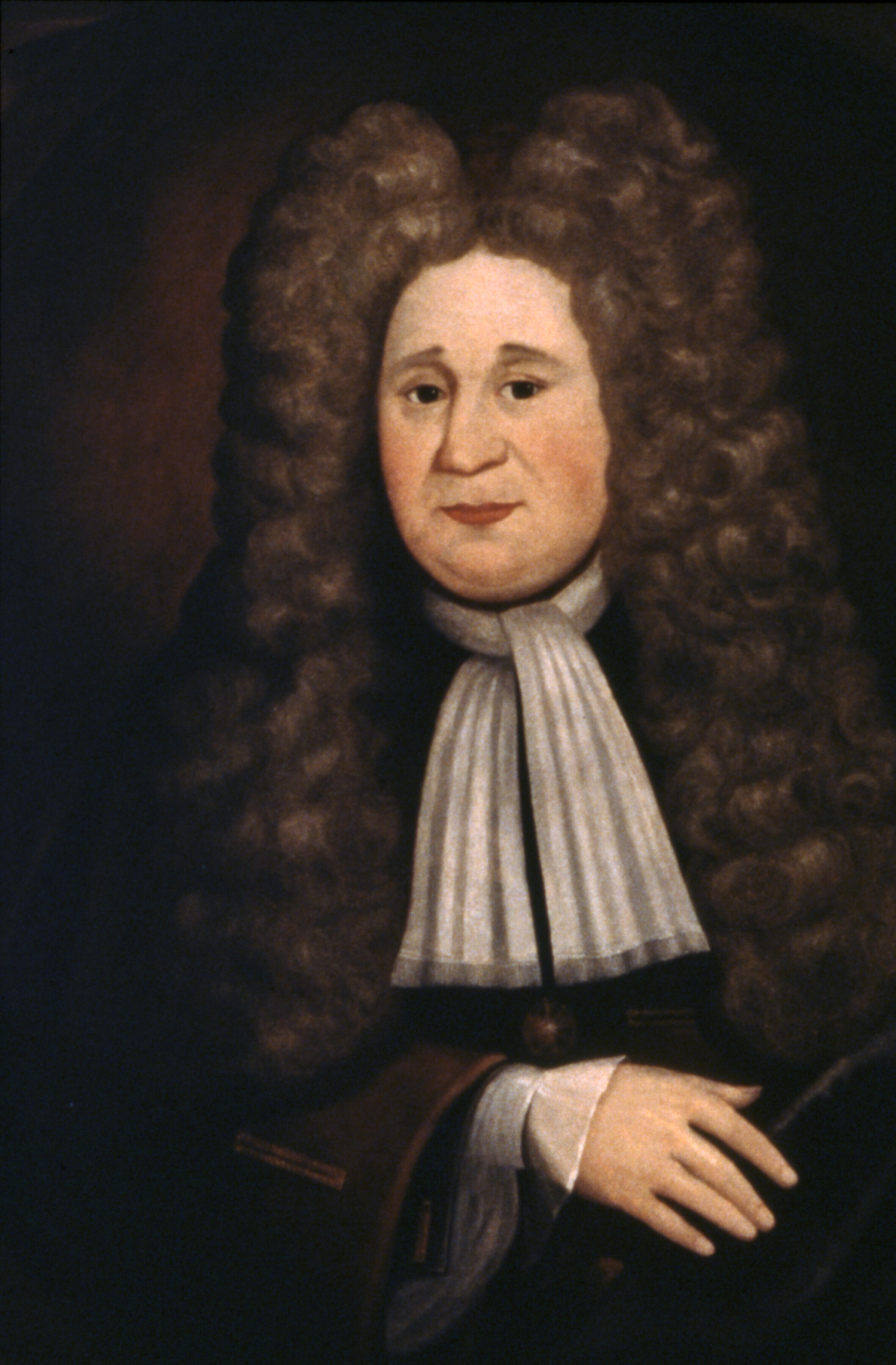
Henry Darnall

Colonel Henry Darnall was granted 7,000 acres (28 km^{2}) of land in Prince George's County, Maryland in 1703 by Charles Calvert, 3rd Baron Baltimore, which Darnall named in recognition of Lord Baltimore's gesture. Darnall built a house for his family on a nearby property, known as The Woodyard, between 1683 and 1711.

On Henry Darnall's death in 1711, the properties passed to his son, Henry Darnall II, who was forced to dispose of much of his father's accumulated 35,000 acres (140 km^{2}) of property to clear his debts before leaving the country. His son, Henry Darnall III received the remaining 1,300 acres (5.3 km^{2}) from his father, including 300 acres (1.2 km^{2}) of the original grant with a mansion, which became known as Poplar Hill by the 1740s. Henry III, however, was found in 1761 to be embezzling money from one of his appointed positions, causing a bond to be forfeited and for fines to be paid by Henry's guarantors, his brother John Darnall, and Charles Carroll of Annapolis.

Henry III's brother Robert Darnall found the means to buy back the original grant and replaced the original house with the present structure, completed in 1786. Darnall, who died childless in 1803, left the property to his nephew Robert Sewall. Sewall in turn left the property to his son Robert Darnall Sewall. The son in turn left the property to two nieces, Susan and Ellen Daingerfield of Alexandria, Virginia, in 1853. In 1865 Susan Daingerfield married future US Senator John Strode Barbour.

Through the next hundred years, the property passed through a number of hands, including David K.E. Bruce, Chandler Hale, and the Catholic Archdiocese of Washington.

== Description ==
His Lordship's Kindness is a five-part ensemble with a hipped-roof central block measuring 56 feet (17 m) wide by 48 feet (15 m) deep. The central block is 2½ stories tall, with dormers in the rear elevation. It is connected to two -1/2 story end pavilions by single-story hyphens. The eastern pavilion contained the kitchen, while a chapel was located in the west pavilion. The kitchen was renovated as a study in the 1920s but retained an interior balcony. The main block features a projecting bay containing the recessed entry door with fanlight, pilasters and pediment, and a large Palladian window on the second story. The facade's other windows have stone sills and flat arch lintels. The rear, or garden elevation is similarly composed, but lacks the projecting bay, and the door is less elaborately detailed.

A center hall extends from the front to the garden doors. Narrow lateral halls run out to the wings, and with the center hall, subdivide the first floor into four rooms. The center hall is bisected by a wide arch, with the main stairway to the rear on the east side. The plan of the first floor is repeated on the second, with four bedrooms.

== Visiting ==
The John M. and Sara R. Walton Foundation own and operate the property as a historic house museum. Guided tours of the historic house are offered from March through December. The facilities are available for rental.

== Gallery ==
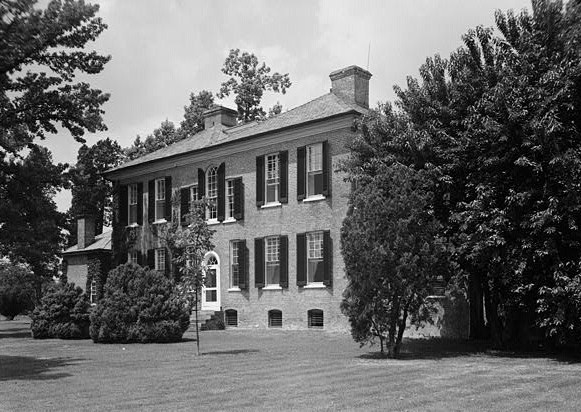
His Lordship's Kindness, HABS Photo

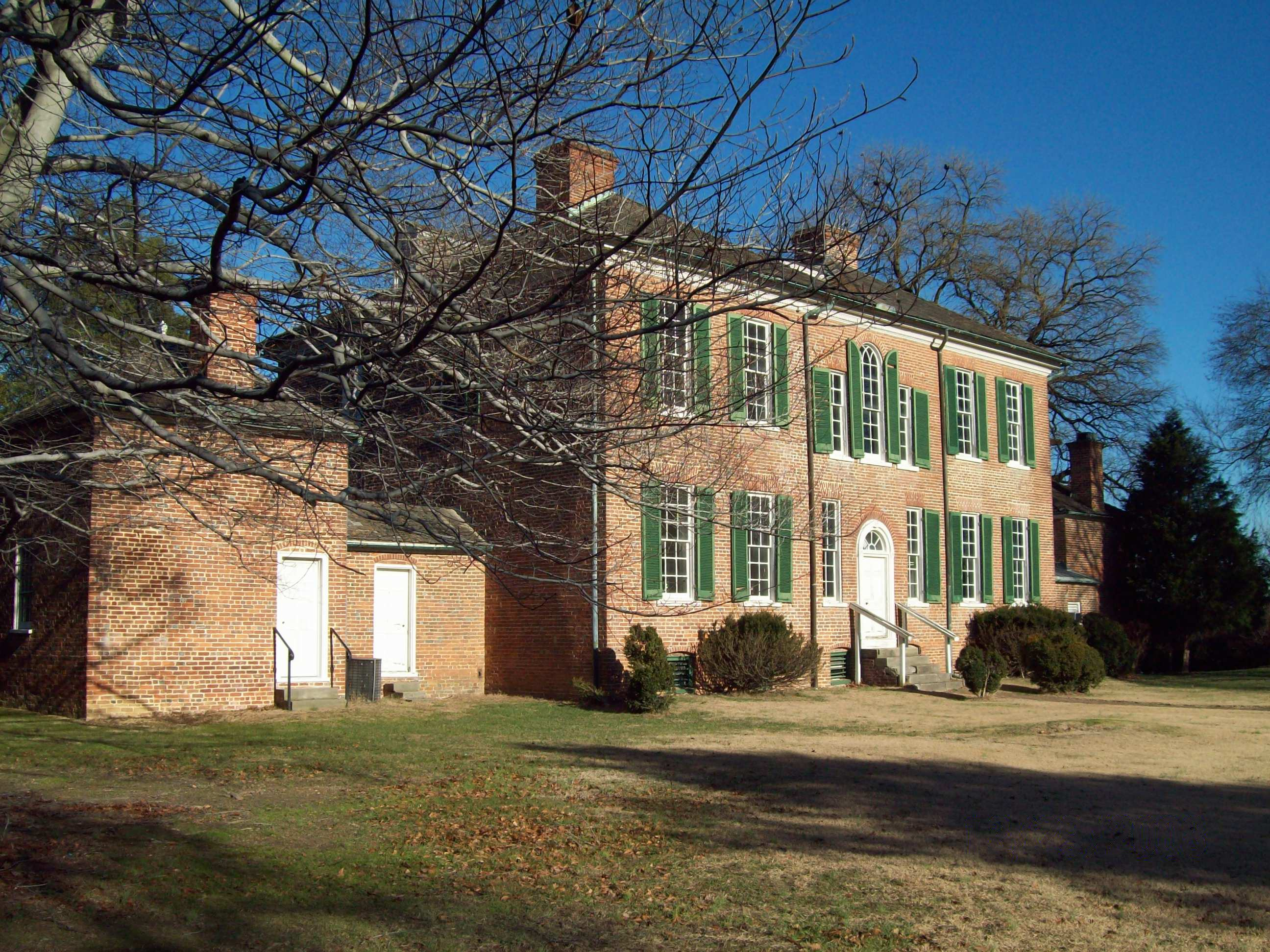
His Lordship's Kindness - South Front, December 2008

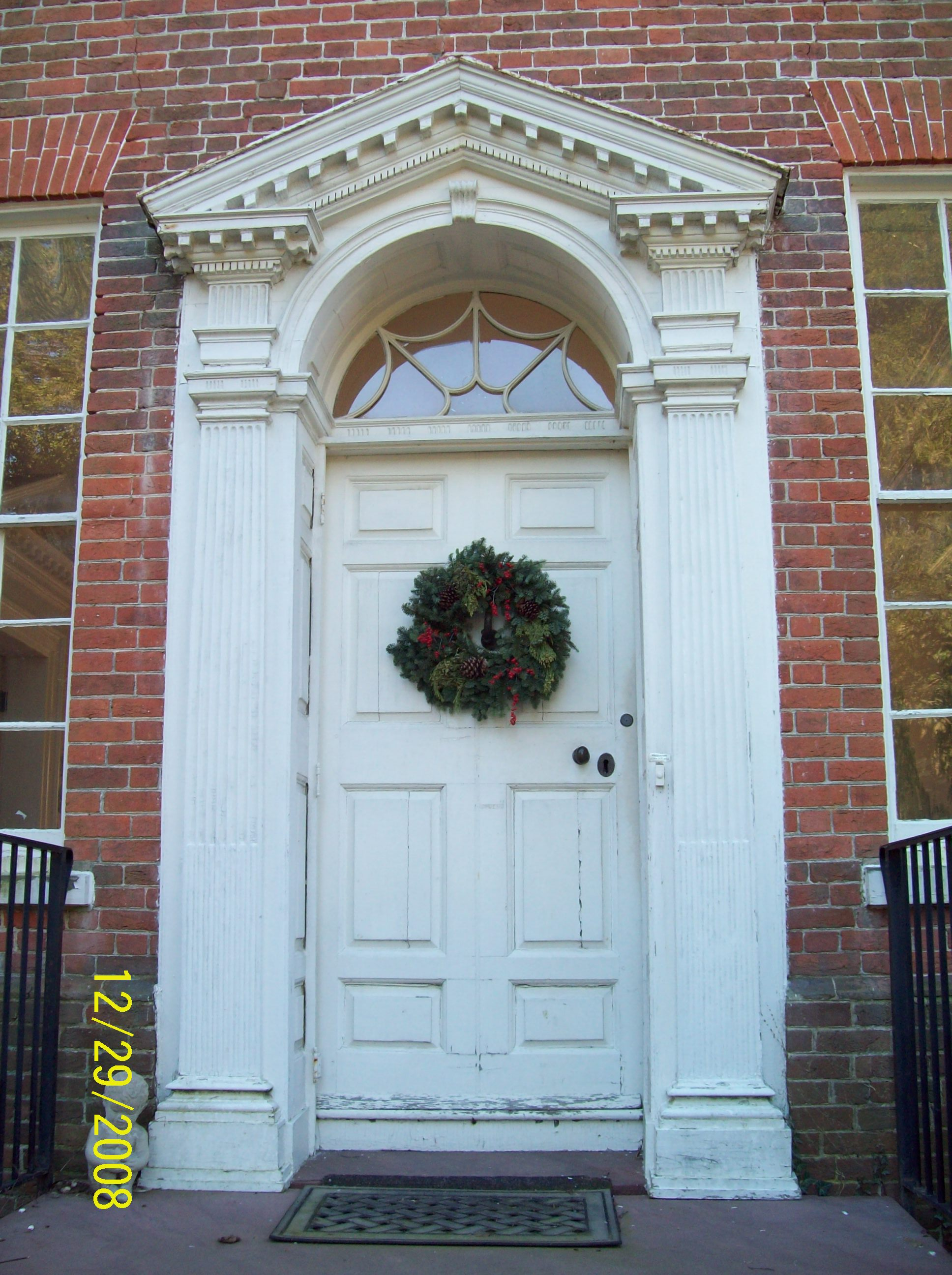
His Lordship's Kindness - Entry Detail, December 2008

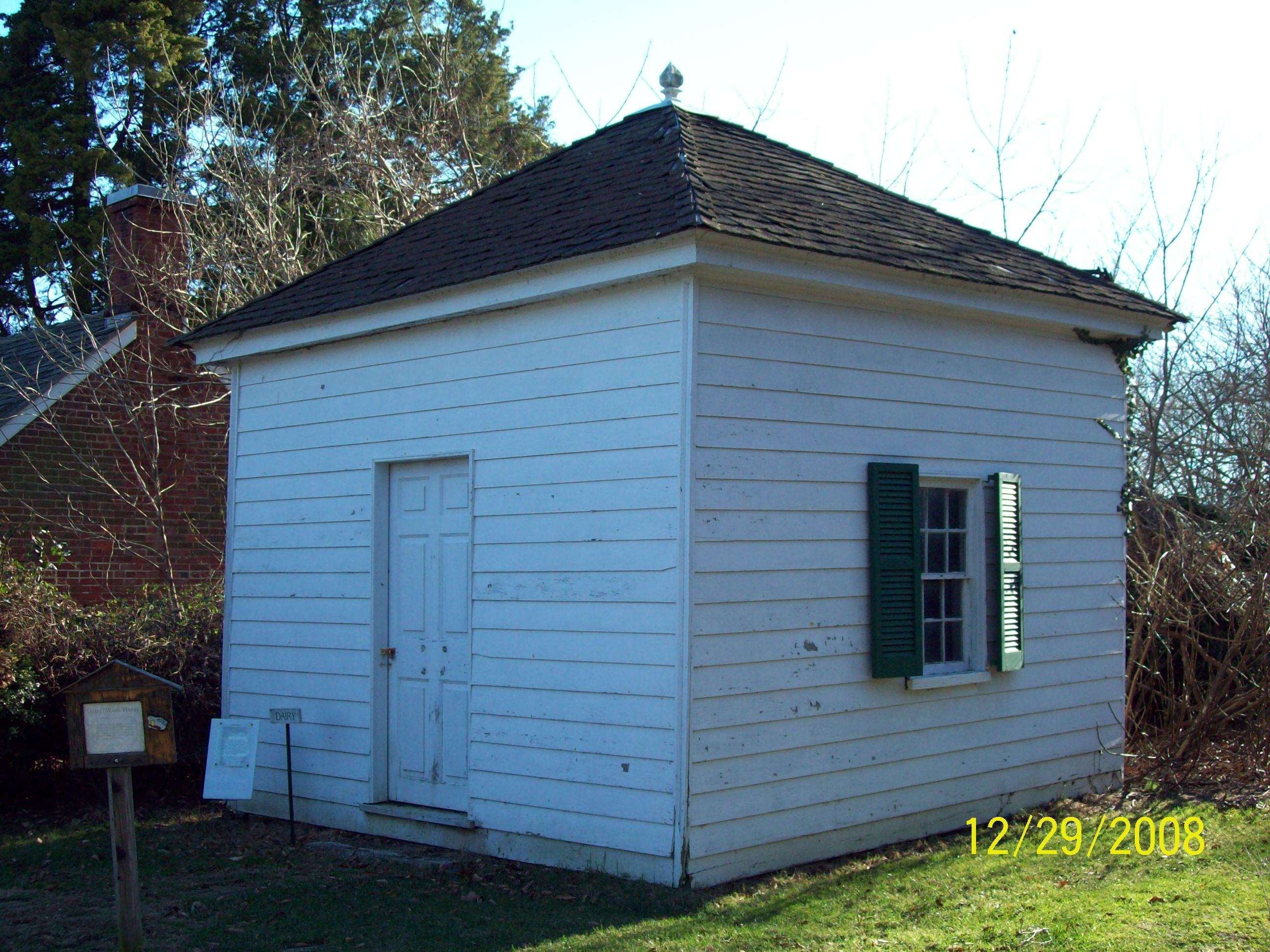
His Lordship's Kindness - Dairy, December 2008

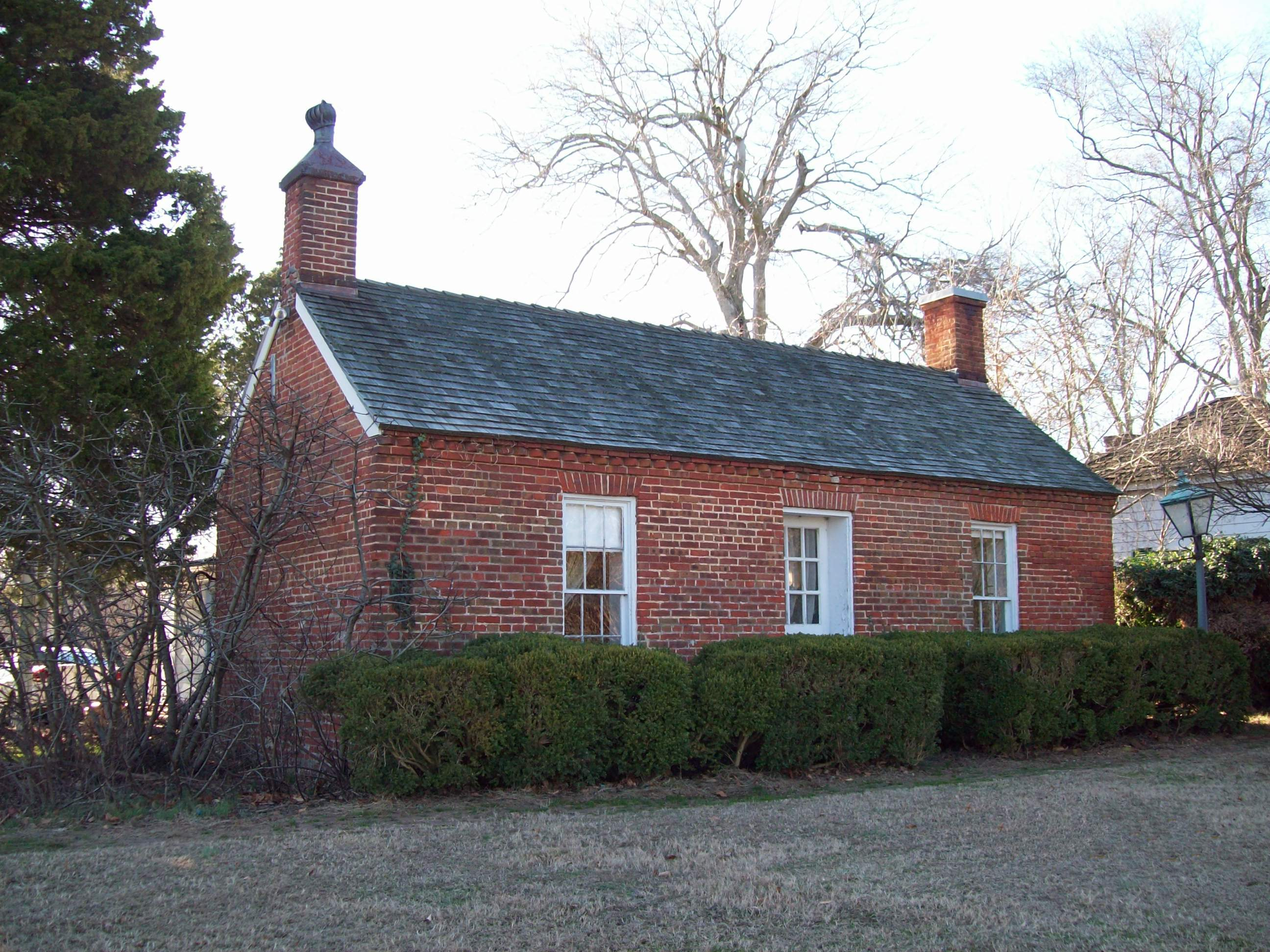
His Lordship's Kindness - Slave Hospital, December 2008

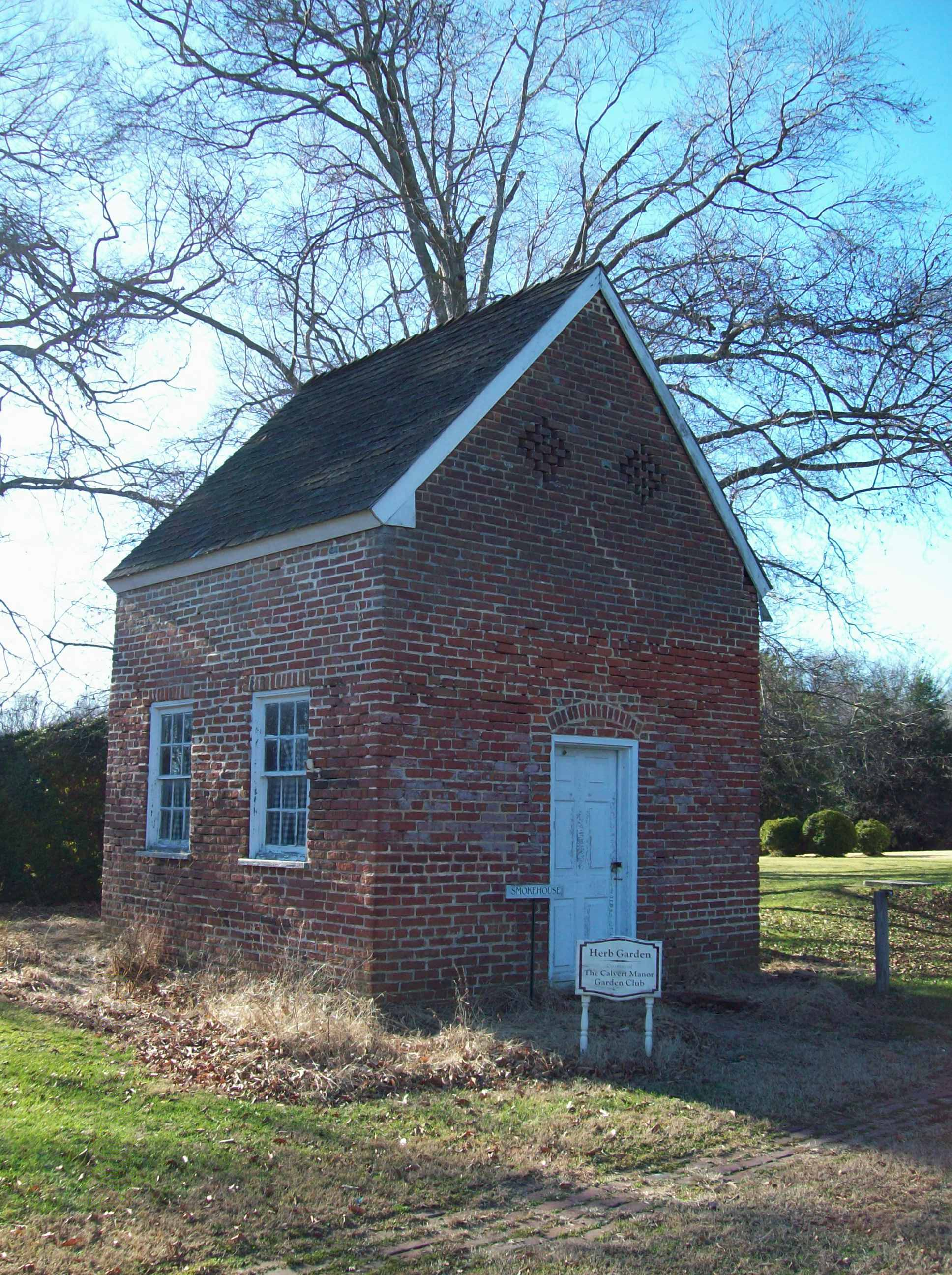
His Lordship's Kindness - Smokehouse, December 2008

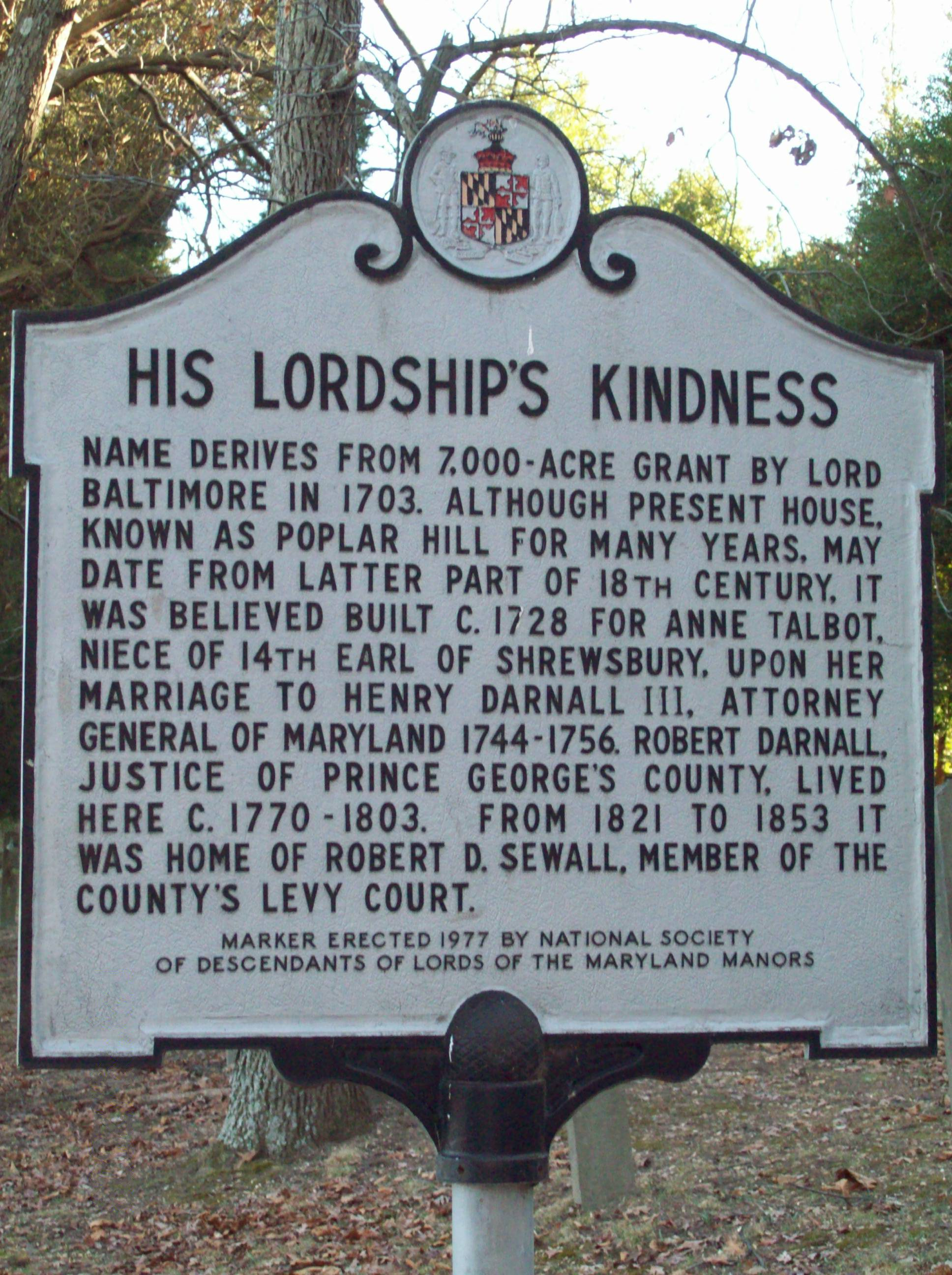
His Lordship's Kindness - Historic Marker, December 2008

== See also ==
- List of National Historic Landmarks in Maryland
- National Register of Historic Places listings in Prince George's County, Maryland
