= Protestant Revolution =

Protestant Revolution may refer to:

- Protestant Reformation, the 16th-century movement within Western Christianity
- Protestant Revolution (Maryland), the political revolution that turned Maryland Protestant in 1689
