= Eleanor Darnall Carroll =

American heiress (1703 - 1796)

Eleanor Darnall
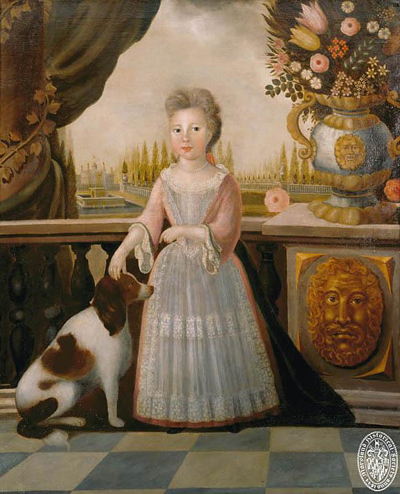
- Eleanor Darnall as a child, c. 1710, painted by Justus Engelhardt Kühn
- Born: 1703; The Woodyard, Prince George’s County, Maryland
- Died: 1796 (aged 92–93)
- Occupation: heiress
- Spouse: Daniel Carroll
- Children: 6, including Daniel Carroll
- Father: Henry Darnall II
- Relatives: Henry Darnall (paternal grandfather); William Digges (maternal grandfather); Carrol family (by marriage)

Eleanor Darnall Carroll (1703–1796) was a prominent heiress in colonial Maryland. She married Daniel Carroll, a wealthy planter, and together they became the parents of two notable figures in American history: Daniel Carroll, a Founding Father of the United States, and John Carroll, the first Archbishop of Baltimore and the founder of Georgetown University.

== Early life ==
Eleanor Darnall was born into a wealthy planter family in about 1703, most likely at The Woodyard, the Darnall family home in Prince George’s County, Maryland. She was the daughter of Anne Digges (daughter of William Digges) and Henry Darnall II. The latter was a planter whose father Henry Darnall had held a number of governmental offices in the colonial administration of Maryland. As a child she was painted by the German painter Justus Engelhardt Kühn.

Eleanor was among the few women in colonial America to receive a formal education; she had been sent to a convent school in Flanders to finish her education. She inherited from her paternal grandfather, Henry Darnall, 27,000 acres in Prince George's County, where the family made their home in Upper Marlboro.

== Family ==
Eleanor Darnall married Daniel Carroll, a wealthy merchant and planter. The couple had seven children:

- Henry Carroll, drowned in boyhood
- Daniel Carroll (1730 – 1796), who would become one of the Founding Fathers of the United States
- Ann Carroll Brent (1733-1804), mother of Robert Brent, first mayor of the city of Washington.
- John Carroll (1735-1815), Archbishop of Baltimore and founder of Georgetown University
- Eleanor Carroll Brent (c. 1737-1810), married William Brent of Virginia
- Mary (1742-1815)
- Elizabeth (1745-1821)

== Legacy ==
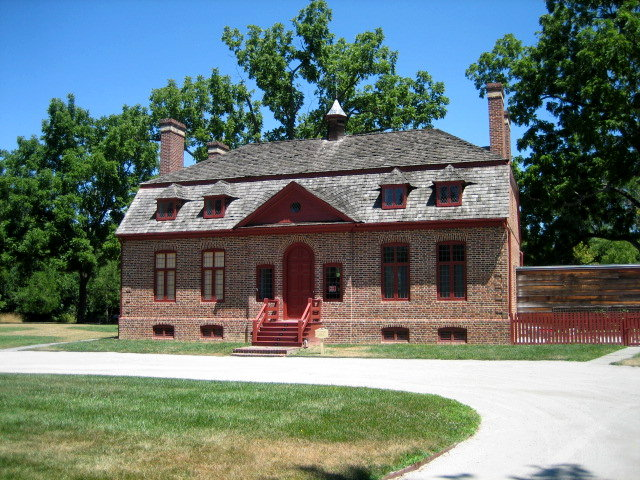
Darnall's Chance.

In around 1741 Eleanor Carroll and her husband sold some land to a merchant named James Wardrop. In 1742 Wardrop built the house known as Darnall's Chance, which today houses the Darnall's Chance House Museum, an historic house museum which opened to the public in 1988.

Georgetown University's Darnall Hall is named in her honor.
