= Woodyard Archeological Site =

- U.S. National Register of Historic Places
- Nearest city: Clinton, Maryland
- Architect: Henry Darnall
- NRHP reference No.: 74002199
- Added to NRHP: December 19, 1974

The Woodyard Archeological Site is an unexcavated archaeological site located in Clinton, Prince George's County, Maryland. This site was originally patented as "Darnall’s Delight" for Colonel Henry Darnall in 1683. Sometime before 1711, Darnall built a large brick mansion known as "The Woodyard."

In 1765, Darnall's Delight was purchased by Stephen West, who added a large wing to the brick house. West established a firearms manufactory and spinning mill to supply the Continental forces during the American Revolutionary War. The original plantation house was destroyed during the Civil War. The site includes an L-shaped brick house constructed about 1870.

It was listed on the National Register of Historic Places in 1974.
