= Stephen West (Maryland merchant) =

American businessman and politician (1727–1790)

Stephen West, Jr. (1727–1790) was a merchant, plantation owner, and public official from Maryland. During the American Revolutionary War, he manufactured and sold guns, blankets, and other items to the American government, in addition to repairing gun locks and bayonets. He served as a representative from Prince George's County at the Annapolis Convention in 1775 and in the Maryland House of Delegates from 1777 to 1778. He was elected as a delegate to the Continental Congress in 1780 but did not serve. He owned The Woodyard mansion, one of the largest in Maryland at the time. He had over 100 slaves to run his plantation.

His grandson Richard West (son of General Stephen West III) married the sister of the wife of Francis Scott Key. It was Richard who notified Key that his neighbor had been arrested and taken to a British ship and asked Key to try to get him released. Thus the beginning of the "Star Spangled Banner".

Stephen West, Jr. was the son of Stephen West, Sr. who arrived from England in Maryland in 1711. His father was a wealthy noble Englishman and sent his son off to America with a guaranteed income. Stephen West, Sr. settled in London Town, Maryland, was involved in shipping, and had a tavern and a ferry. London Town Museum has much information about Stephen West, Sr.
