= Daniel Carroll =

American politician, signed US Constitution (1730–1796)

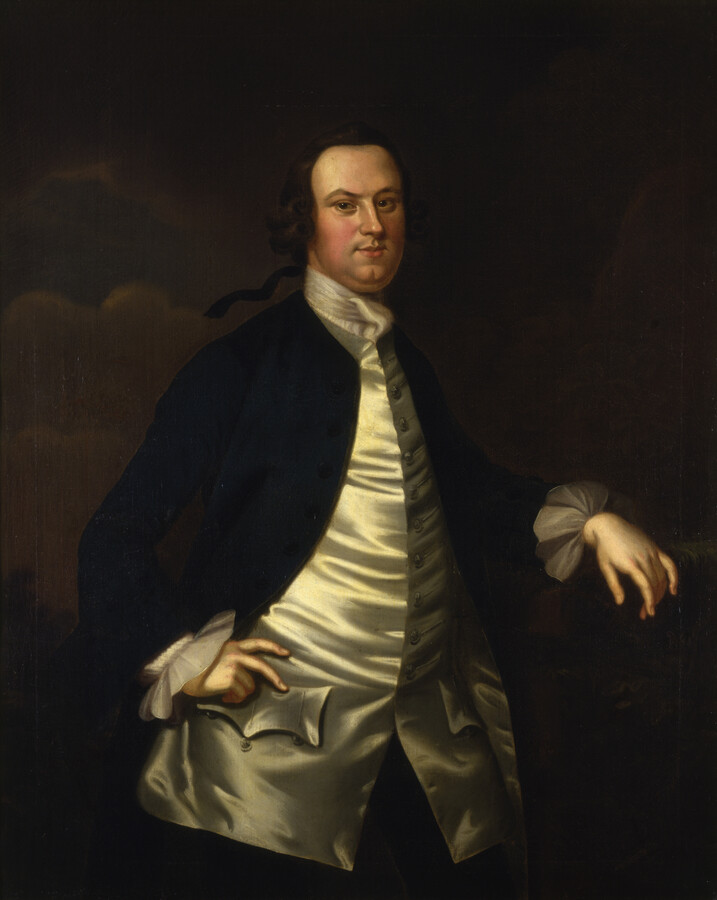
- Portrait by John Wollaston, 1753–1754.

Member of the U.S. House of Representatives from Maryland's 6th district
- In office March 4, 1789 – March 3, 1791
- Preceded by: Office established
- Succeeded by: Upton Sheredine

3rd Commissioner of the Federal City
- In office March 4, 1791 – May 21, 1795
- Preceded by: Office established
- Succeeded by: Alexander White

Personal details
- Born: July 22, 1730 Marlborough Town, Province of Maryland, British America
- Died: May 7, 1796 (aged 65) Forest Glen, Maryland, U.S.
- Resting place: St. John the Evangelist Catholic Church (Silver Spring, Maryland)
- Parents: Daniel Carroll; Eleanor Darnall Carroll
- Relatives: John Carroll; Charles Carroll of Carrollton
- Known for: one of the Founding Fathers of the United States

Daniel Carroll Jr. (July 22, 1730 – May 7, 1796) was one of the Founding Fathers of the United States, a Maryland politician, and a plantation owner. He supported the American Revolution, served in the Confederation Congress, was a delegate to the Philadelphia Convention of 1787 which penned the Constitution of the United States, and was a U.S. representative in the First Congress. Carroll was one of five men to sign both the Articles of Confederation and the Constitution. He was one of the few Catholics among the Founders.

== Early life ==
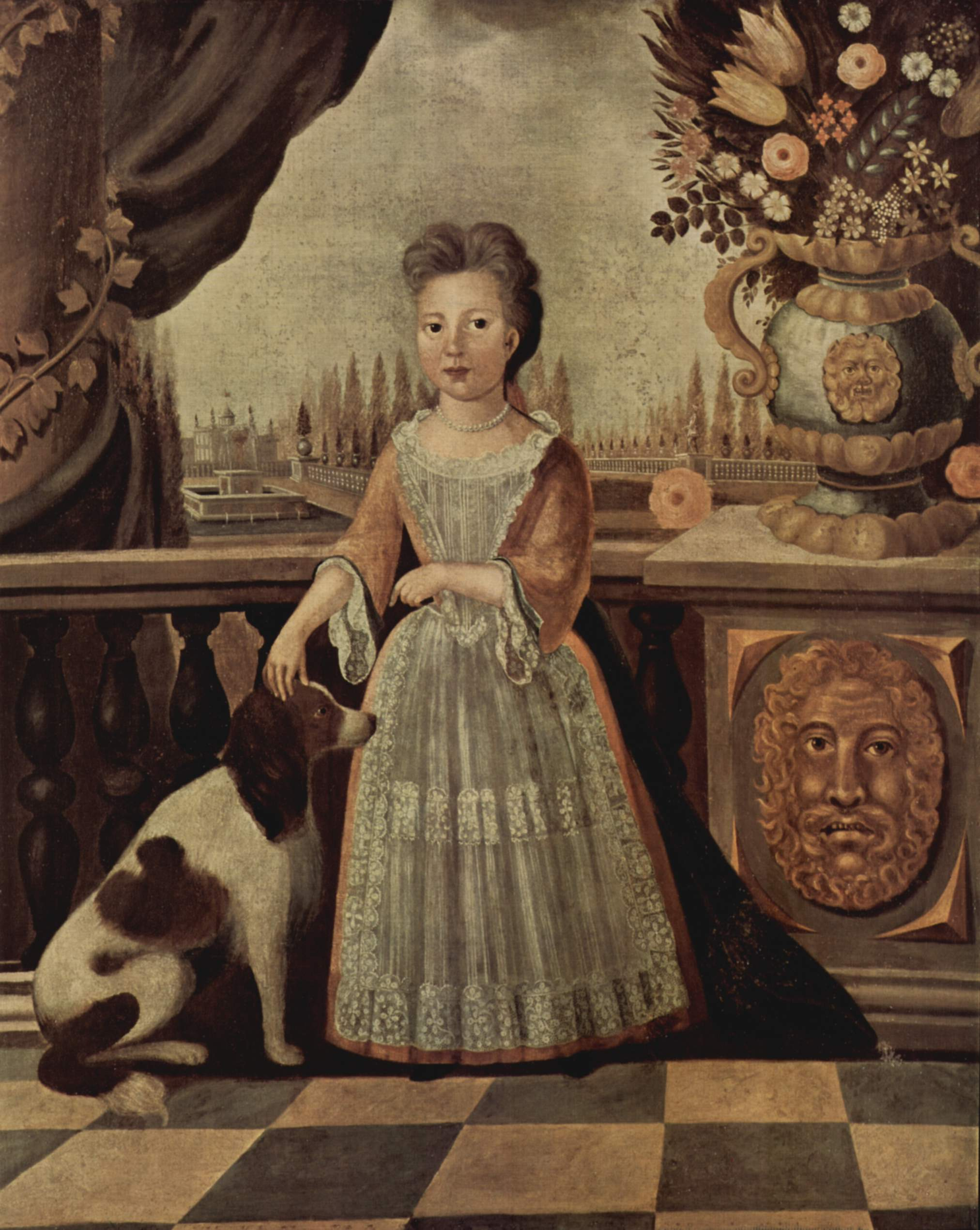
Carroll's mother Eleanor Darnall Carroll as a child, by Justus Engelhardt Kühn, c. 1710

Carroll was born in Marlborough Town in the Province of Maryland on July 22, 1730. He was the son of wealthy planters Daniel Carroll (c.1696 - 1751) and Eleanor Darnall Carroll (1703-1796). His parents' home was Darnall's Chance, a plantation of 27,000 acres which his mother had inherited from her grandfather. Carroll was sent abroad for his education. Between 1742 and 1748 he studied under the Jesuits at the College of St. Omer in France, established for the education of English Catholics. Then, after a tour of Europe, he sailed home and soon married Eleanor Carroll, apparently a first cousin, whose great-grandparents were Daniel Carroll and Dorothy Kennedy from Ireland.

His younger brother John was the first Catholic bishop in the United States (as Bishop of Baltimore, 1790) and founder of Georgetown University; his cousin Charles Carroll of Carrollton signed the Declaration of Independence.

== Career ==
In the 1770s, Carroll gradually joined the Patriot cause. As a slaveholder and large landholder, he was initially concerned that the Revolution might fail economically and bring about his family's financial ruin and mob rule.

At the time, Maryland, though Catholic-founded, had (like the rest of the Thirteen Colonies) issued laws excluding Catholics from holding public office. When Maryland declared its independence from the Crown and enacted its first constitution, these laws were nullified. Carroll was elected to the Maryland Senate, serving 1777–1781. As a state senator, he helped raise troops and money for the American cause. His involvement in the Revolutionary War, like that of other Patriots in his extended family, was inspired by the family's motto: "Strong in Faith and War".

He led the effort to block the State Assembly from ratifying of the Articles of Confederation until the states that had western land claims (which Maryland did not) ceded those claims to Congress. Carroll dropped his opposition only after Virginia relinquished its claims on land north of the Ohio River to Congress, and on February 2, 1781, Maryland became the thirteenth and final state to ratify the Articles.

== Constitutional Convention of 1787 ==
Coat of Arms of Daniel Carroll

In 1787, Carroll was named a Maryland delegate to the Philadelphia Convention, which convened to revise the Articles, and produced the Constitution. Like his good friend James Madison of Virginia, Carroll was convinced that a strong central government was needed to regulate commerce among the states and with other nations. He also spoke out repeatedly in opposition to the payment of members of the United States Congress by the states, reasoning that such compensation would sabotage the strength of the new government because "the dependence of both Houses on the state Legislatures would be complete ... The new government in this form is nothing more than a second edition of [the Continental] Congress in two volumes, instead of one, and perhaps with very few amendments."

When it was suggested that the president (executive branch) should be elected by the Congress (legislative branch), Carroll, seconded by James Wilson, moved that the words "by the legislature" be replaced with "by the people". He and Thomas Fitzsimons were the only Catholics to sign the Constitution, but their presence was a sign of the continued advancement of religious freedom in America. Carroll played an essential role in formulating the limitation of the powers of the federal or central government. He was the author of the presumption—enshrined in the Constitution as a closing article – that powers not specifically delegated to the federal government were reserved to the states or to the people. Carroll spoke about 20 times during the summer of debates at the Constitutional Convention and served on the Committee on Postponed Matters. Returning to Maryland after the convention, he campaigned for ratification of the Constitution but was not a delegate to the Maryland state convention for ratification.

== Political career ==
Following the convention, Carroll continued to be involved in state and national affairs. He was a key participant in the Maryland ratification struggle of 1787–1788. He defended the Constitution in the "Maryland Journal", most notably in his response to the arguments advanced by the well-known Anti-Federalist and Patriot delegate Samuel Chase. After ratification was achieved in Maryland, Carroll was elected as a representative ("congressman") of the Sixth Congressional District of Maryland to the First Congress of 1789, meeting in New York City. Given his concern for economic and fiscal stability, he voted for the assumption of state debts accumulated during the war by the federal government to establish a new level of financial confidence of credible public debts as proposed by Secretary of the Treasury Alexander Hamilton as part of a "grand bargain" with Secretary of State Thomas Jefferson, for Northerners to support locating the new national capital in the upper South, along the Potomac River.

One of three commissioners appointed to survey the newly designated District of Columbia and acquire land for the new federal capital in the District, Carroll was related to two major landowners whose land was acquired by the government, his brother-in-law Notley Young and nephew Daniel Carroll of Duddington. The United States Capitol was built on a wooded hill owned by his nephew. As one of his first official acts as commissioner, on April 15, 1791, he and fellow commissioner David Stuart of Virginia laid the cornerstone for the beginning boundary line survey of the District at Jones Point, on the south bank of the Potomac near Alexandria, formerly in Virginia. He served as a commissioner until 1795, when he retired because of poor health.

He later was again elected to the Maryland Senate. He had many interests in his state and region, including the "Patowmack Company", which sought to build a Patowmack Canal to the West. This was a long-time project of George Washington since his western explorations and military campaigns against the French. This predated the survey and construction thirty years later of the Chesapeake and Ohio Canal.

Carroll died May 7, 1796, at age 65, at his home near Rock Creek in the present neighborhood of Forest Glen, Maryland. Carroll's body was buried there in Saint John the Evangelist Catholic Church Cemetery.

== Legacy ==
Carroll Street in Madison, Wisconsin, is named in his honor.

Political offices
Preceded by Charles Carroll of Carrollton	President of the Maryland State Senate; 1783	Succeeded by Charles Carroll of Carrollton
Preceded by George Plater	President of the Maryland State Senate; 1784	Succeeded by George Plater
Preceded by John Smith	President of the Maryland State Senate; 1787	Succeeded by George Plater
Preceded by George Plater	President of the Maryland State Senate; 1788–1789	Succeeded by John Smith
U.S. House of Representatives
Preceded by no one	U.S. Congressman, Maryland's 6th District; 1789–1791	Succeeded by Upton Sheredine
