= Philip Darnall =

English barrister

Personal details
- Born: Essendon, Hertfordshire
- Spouse: Mary Breton
- Children: Elizabeth Darnall, John Darnall, Henry Darnall, Calvert Darnall
- Occupation: Barrister
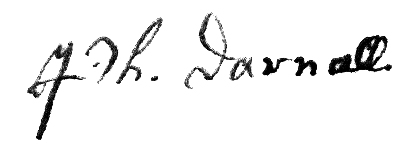
- Signature

Philip Darnall (born 1604) was an English barrister. His son Henry Darnall emigrated to North America, where he became the Proprietary Agent of the Lords Baltimore.

== Early life ==
Philip Darnall was the son of Henry Darnall (1564–1607) and Mary Tooke of "Bird's Place" in Essendon, Hertfordshire, England. Henry Darnall's memorial stone in the parish church was described in 1826 as bearing the following inscription:

Here resteth the bodies of Henry Darnall, of Bird's Place, in this Parish, Esq., Councellor at Law, of Gray's Inn, and of Mary his Wife, Daughter of William Took, Esq; one of the Auditors of his Majesty's Court of Wards and Liveries, by whom he had Issue, John, Henry, Anne, Thomas, Susan, Philip and Ralph Darnall, all living at the time of his Decease. Mary, Philip and Ralph dyed in his life-time; which Henry dyed in the 43d year of his Age, in Febr. anno 1607 and the said Mary his Wife, dyed the 7th of May, 1632, in the 59th year of her Age.

== Career ==
Philip Darnall became a barrister like his father. He is said to have been secretary to George Calvert, and to have converted to Catholicism along with Calvert while the two were on an extended diplomatic mission to France, but this is doubtful. According to the Catholic Encyclopedia, Calvert converted in 1624. The mission to France took place in 1610, when Darnall was still a child.

== Family life ==
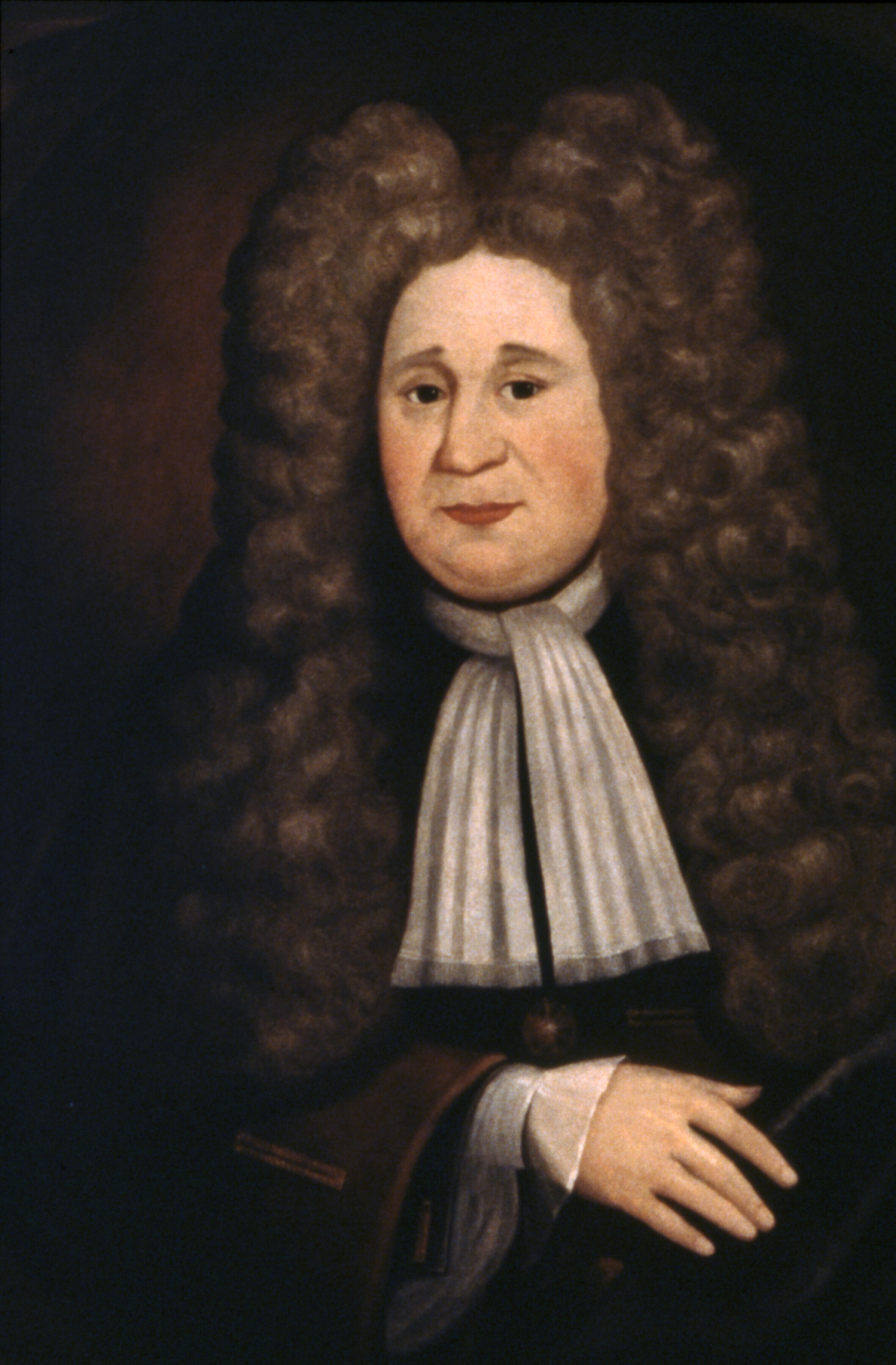
Darnall's son, Henry Darnall

Philip Darnall's brother Ralph, also a barrister, was Clerk to the Parliament during the Protectorate. Ralph Darnall's daughter Mary married Charles Calvert, son and heir of the Proprietor of Maryland, Cecil Calvert, 2nd Lord Baltimore.

Philip Darnall's wife was Mary Breton, daughter of Sir Henry Breton (or Britton) by his wife, Anne Yate, daughter of Edward Yate of Buckland, Berkshire, England. Philip and Mary had at least two sons:

- Colonel Henry Darnall (1645–1711) emigrated to Maryland, where he received political appointments including Deputy Governor under Charles Calvert, third Lord Baltimore, (1637–1715), and large grants of land from the Calverts, and thus amassed a large fortune.
- John Darnall (1647-1684) also emigrated to Maryland, where he settled at Portland Manor in Anne Arundel County and married Susanna Maria Bennett, daughter of Richard Bennett, Jr. (died 1667), by his wife, Henrietta Maria Neale. His will, proved 18 February 1684, named brother Col. Henry Darnall as executor.
