= Mahoney v Ashton =

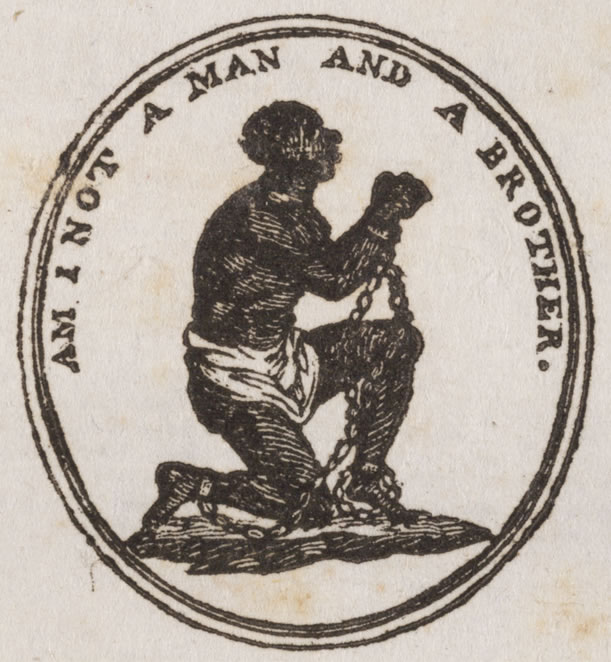
- Court: General Court of the Western Shore, Annapolis, Maryland
- Full case name: Charles Mahoney -v- John Ashton
- Decided: 1799

Court membership
- Judge sitting: Chief Justice Samuel Chase

Keywords
- Slavery, abolition

Mahoney v Ashton was a slavery case brought before the General Court of the Western Shore in Annapolis, Maryland in 1791. On October 18, 1791, enslaved man Charles Mahoney filed a petition for freedom before the court against his owner, Father John Ashton, a Catholic priest and former Jesuit.

Mahoney claimed that he was descended from a free woman named Ann Joice, an indentured servant, making him a free man. Mahoney v. Ashton dragged on for twelve years, including three jury trials and two appeal hearings. The result was inconclusive, but on the 4th of May 1804 John Ashton recorded a deed that "forever set free Charles Mahoney.", and agreed to "relinquish and renounce all claim whatever which I have or ever had to him."

The case involved hundreds of participants including many notable members of the Maryland slave-owning gentry, including Charles Carroll of Carrollton.

== See also ==
- Somerset v Stewart, aka Somersett's case
