= Lettice Lee =

American colonial society hostess

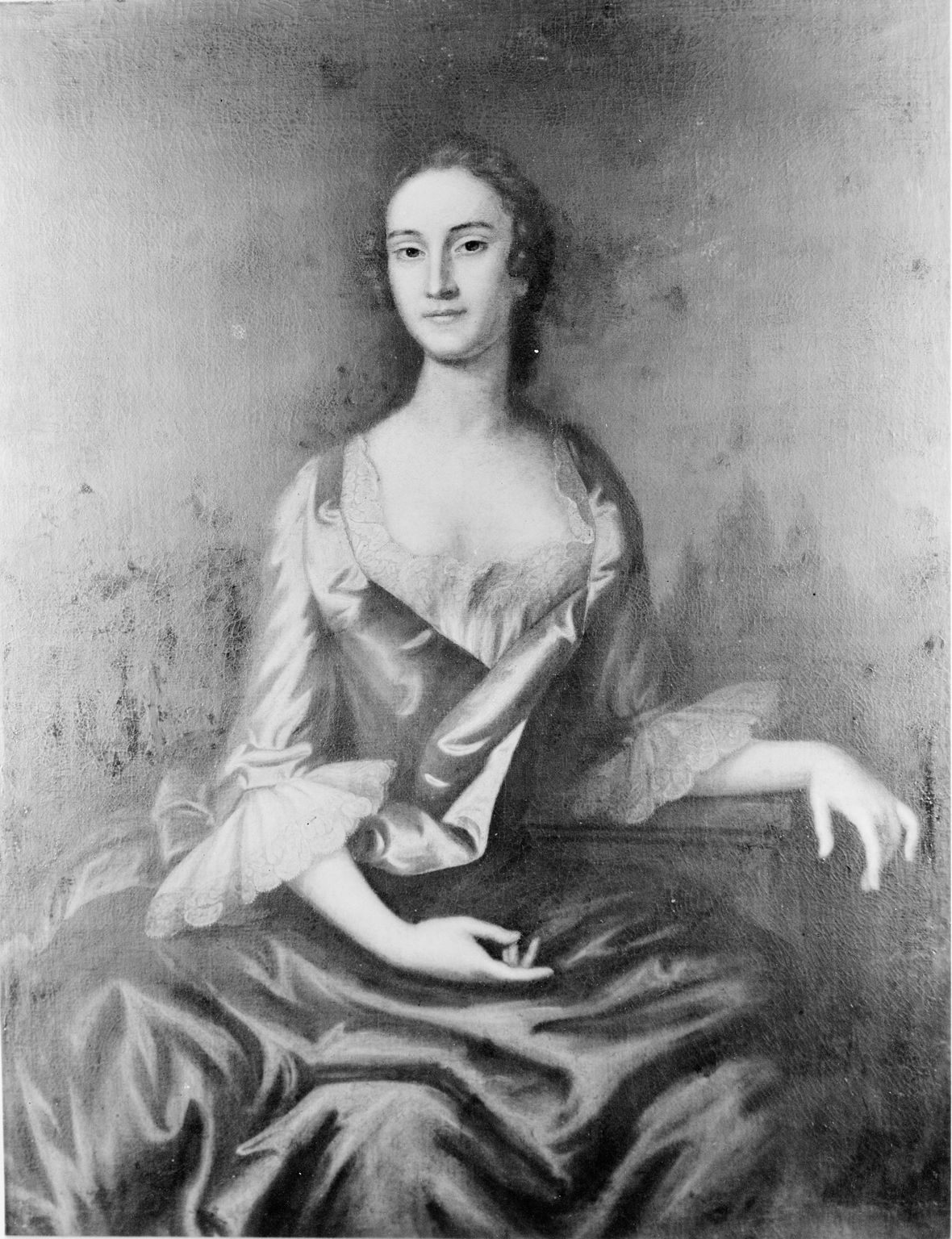
- 1750 Portrait of Lee by John Wollaston
- Born: Laetitia Lee; 1731; Prince George's County, Colony of Maryland, British Empire
- Died: April 3, 1776 (aged 44–45); Prince George's County, Maryland, U.S.
- Resting place: Darnall's Chance
- Spouses: James Wardrop; Adam Thompson; Joseph Sim
- Parent(s): Philip Lee Sr. Elizabeth Fowke
- Relatives: Lee family

Laetitia "Lettice" Lee, also known as Lettice Lee Wardrop Thompson Sim, (1731 – April 3, 1776) was an American colonial planter, society hostess, slaveowner, and châtelaine of Darnall's Chance. A member of the prominent Lee family of Virginia and Maryland, she lived a privileged life typical for members of the planter class. Unusual for her time, Lee was married three times; first to James Wardrop, then Adam Thompson, and lastly to Colonel Joseph Sim. She lived at Darnall's Chance for the second half of her life, throughout all three of her marriages.

== Biography ==
Lee was born in Prince George's County, Maryland in 1731. She was the daughter of Philip Lee Sr., the progenitor of the Maryland branch of the Lee family, and Elizabeth, widow of Henry Sewell. A member of the American gentry, she was a granddaughter of Colonel Richard Lee II, a Virginian planter and politician, and his wife, Laetitia Corbin Lee, and a great-granddaughter of Richard Lee I, who immigrated to the Colony of Virginia from Shropshire, England, and Henry Corbin, one of the most influential politicians in the colony.

In 1748 she married James Wardrop, a Scottish immigrant who made a fortune as a merchant in Upper Marlboro, Maryland. She and her husband owned and managed Darnall's Chance, a large plantation in Upper Marlboro. The plantation included a large brick house, outbuildings, orchards, an ornamental garden, and a farm for livestock. They enslaved thirty-two people on their plantation, including house slaves, craftsmen, and field hands. Lee lived at Darnall's Chance for almost thirty years.

She was described by George Washington as "this fair lady".

Following her husband's death in 1760, Lee married a second time to Dr. Adam Thompson, a Scottish physician who created the American Method of smallpox inoculation. After the death of her second husband, she married a third time to Colonel Joseph Sim.

Lee died on April 3, 1776. She left the plantation to her children. In June 2004, Lee's remains were reinterred in the restored family vault, along with eight other members of the family, at Darnall's Chance. Her grave had been discovered on the grounds of the plantation seventeen years prior.
