= Darnall's Chance =

Historic house in Maryland, US

- Buck House
- U.S. National Register of Historic Places
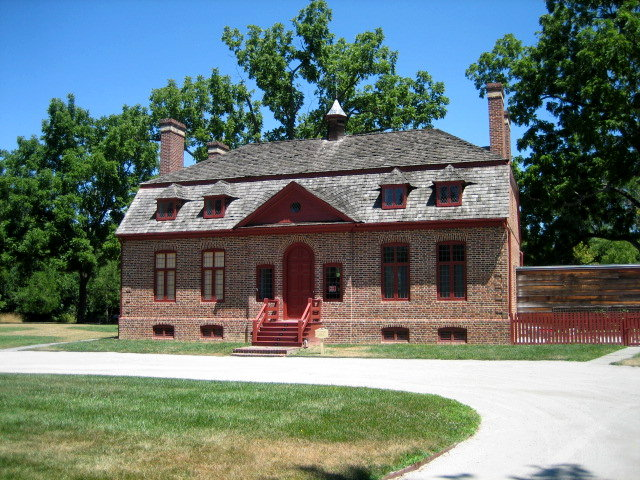
- Darnall's Chance in July, 2007

- Location within Maryland Location within the United States
- Interactive map showing the location of Darnall’s Chance
- Location: 14800 Governor Oden Bowie Drive, Upper Marlboro, Maryland
- Coordinates: 38°49′09.22″N 76°44′57.51″W
- Built: 1742
- NRHP reference No.: 78003118
- Added to NRHP: April 20, 1978

Darnall's Chance, also known as Buck House, Buck-Wardrop House, or James Wardrop House, is a historic home located at 14800 Governor Oden Bowie Drive, in Upper Marlboro, Prince George's County, Maryland, United States.

It is named after Colonel Henry Darnall, a wealthy Roman Catholic planter, who was the Proprietary Agent of Charles Calvert, 3rd Baron Baltimore and who served for a time as Deputy Governor of the Province. The house itself was built c. 1742 by a merchant named James Wardrop who bought some of Darnall's land from Eleanor Darnall Carroll and her husband Daniel Carroll, a politician and wealthy planter. Wardrop enslaved 32 people at the house.

Today, Darnall's Chance houses the Darnall's Chance House Museum, a historic house museum which opened to the public in 1988.

== History ==
=== Origins ===
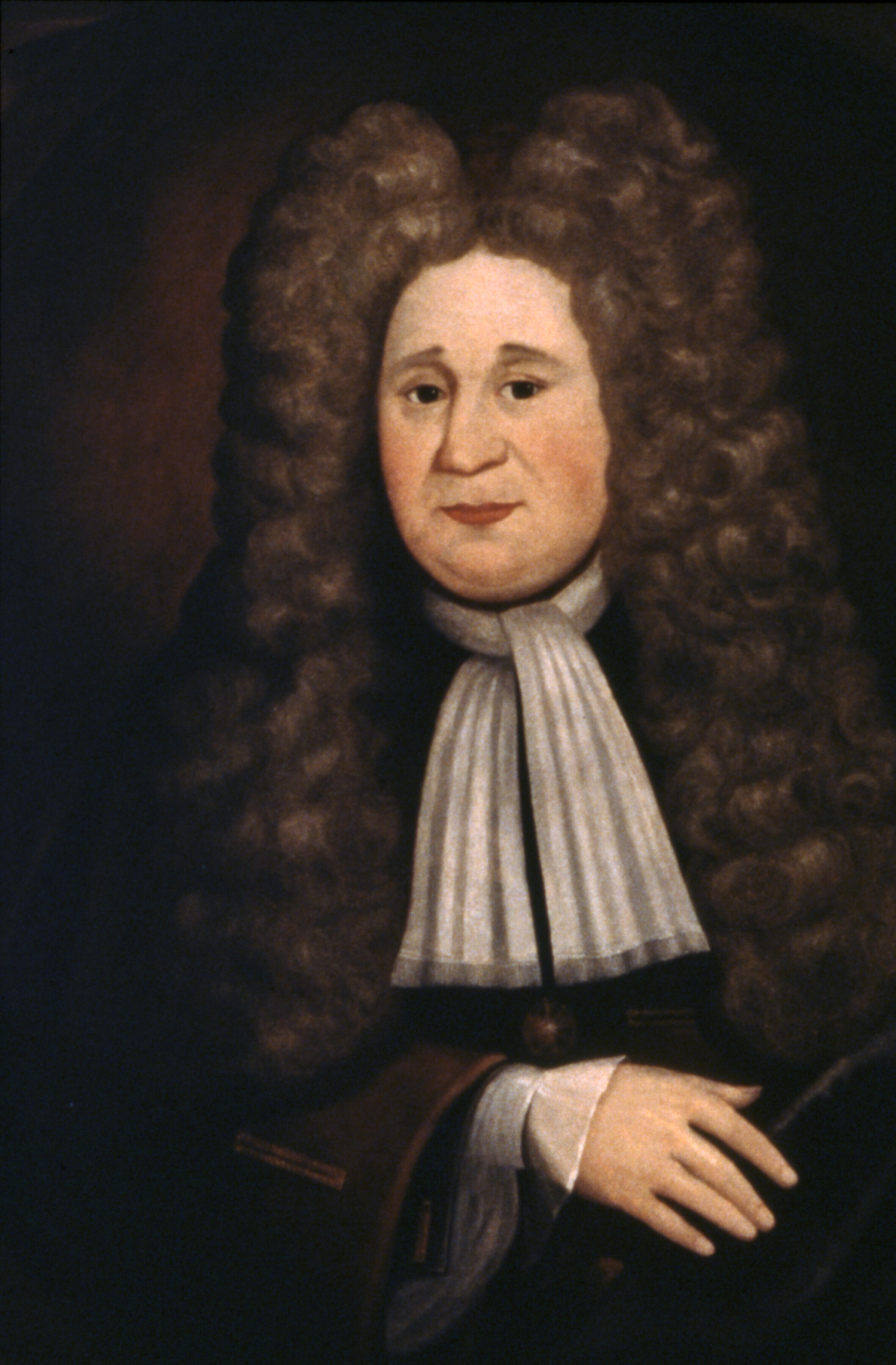
Colonel Henry Darnall (1645–1711)

The tract of land the house sits on was patented in 1704 by Col. Henry Darnall (1645–1711), a wealthy Maryland Roman Catholic planter, Proprietary Agent of Charles Calvert, 3rd Baron Baltimore and, for a time, Deputy Governor of Maryland. However, during the Protestant Revolution of 1689, Darnall's proprietarial army was defeated by the Puritan army of Colonel John Coode, and he was stripped of his numerous offices.

When Col. Darnall died in 1711, he owned 27,000 acres (11,000 ha) in Prince George's County, as well as holdings in four other counties. The property of what became known as Darnall's Chance passed through his family to his granddaughter Eleanor Darnall, who married Daniel Carroll I in 1727.

Their family was reared on the large landholding and plantation. Two Carroll sons were prominent members of colonial and early United States society: Daniel Carroll became a politician in the Continental Congress and Maryland Senate, and member of the Constitutional Convention; and John Carroll became the first Roman Catholic bishop in the United States, and founder of Georgetown University.

In 1741, the Carrolls sold 6 3/4 acres of their land to James Wardrop, a Scottish merchant. Wardrop built a 15-room brick dwelling house within a year, originally a 1 1/2-story, Flemish bond brick house. It is that house that currently stands on the property. After living at Darnall's Chance as a bachelor for six years, Wardrop married 22-year-old Lettice Lee, whose father, Philip Lee Sr., was a member of the Lee family of Westmoreland County, Virginia.

=== Nineteenth century ===
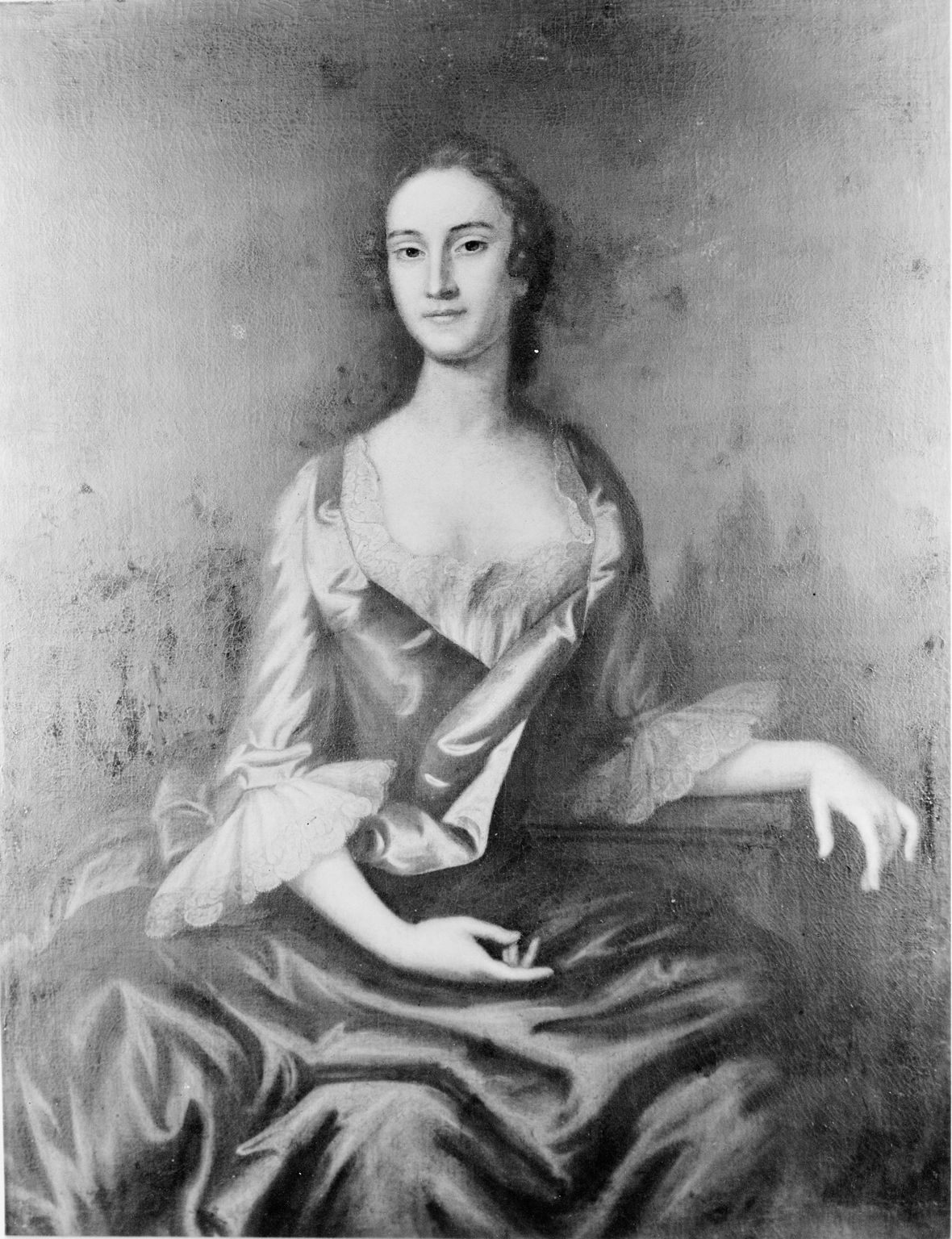
Lettice Lee, portrait by John Wollaston

In the mid-19th century, the house was remodeled to two stories, of stuccoed brick, with Italianate and Greek Revival stylistic elements. The major alterations to the property were probably carried out under the ownership of Edward Grafton W. Hall, who owned it between 1857 and 1887.

=== Modern era ===
The house and property were acquired by the Maryland-National Capital Park and Planning Commission in 1974, for administrative offices, but was later renovated and reopened as a house museum.

Darnall's Chance was listed on the National Register of Historic Places in 1978. The official name for the house, the Buck House, is for a late-20th-century owner, Harry Buck Sr. After renovations and opening as a house museum, the property was subsequently renamed Darnall's Chance, after its first owner.

In 1986, the entire second floor and roof were removed, and the house was reconstructed to its 18th-century appearance. Two years later, it opened as Darnall's Chance House Museum.

== Darnall's Chance House Museum ==
Darnall's Chance House Museum is a historic house museum which opened to the public in 1988. It is operated by the Maryland-National Capital Park and Planning Commission. The tour at Darnall's Chance focuses on the life of Lettice Lee, as she lived in the house for almost thirty years, married three times, and was an unusual 18th-century woman. It also includes more general information on the other women who lived at Darnall's Chance and in Prince George's County at that time.

The house is open for tours on Friday from noon to 4 pm, Sunday from noon to 4 pm, and at other times by appointment. Public programs offered at the Museum include tea lessons for young ladies, a pirate-for-a-day program, and an annual gingerbread house contest and show. The Museum rents its tented patio, which has a capacity of 125, for weddings and other events.

== Burial vault ==
During 1987, an underground vault was discovered on the property. The vault when discovered, was filled with 8 feet of trash from the 18th and 19th century. Under the trash were found nine sets of human remains: three adults and six children. It was later determined that five of those remains were of native-born Americans. It was concluded that the people died of various illnesses.
