= Justus Engelhardt Kühn =

American painter

Justus Engelhardt Kühn (unknown-c1717) a German man, was a portrait painter active in colonial Maryland in the early part of the eighteenth century. He was the earliest professional artist to work in the Middle Atlantic colonies. A number of his portraits are held in the collection of the Maryland Historical Society.

== Early life ==
Kuhn was a Protestant, of German origin. Little is known of his early life.

== Career ==
Kuhn was active in the early 1700s and painted a number of local dignitaries in Maryland including Henry Darnall III, Charles Carroll of Annapolis and Eleanor Darnall Carroll.

Kuhn applied for naturalization at Annapolis in 1708. He became the churchwarden at St. Ann's church at Annapolis in 1717. He died six months later.

== Gallery ==
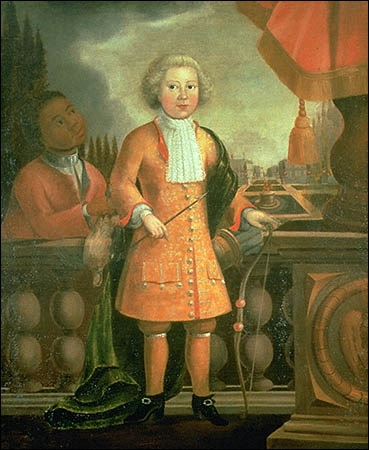
Henry Darnall III, as a child, c.1712

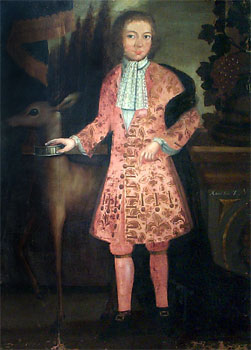
Charles Carroll of Annapolis as a child, c.1712

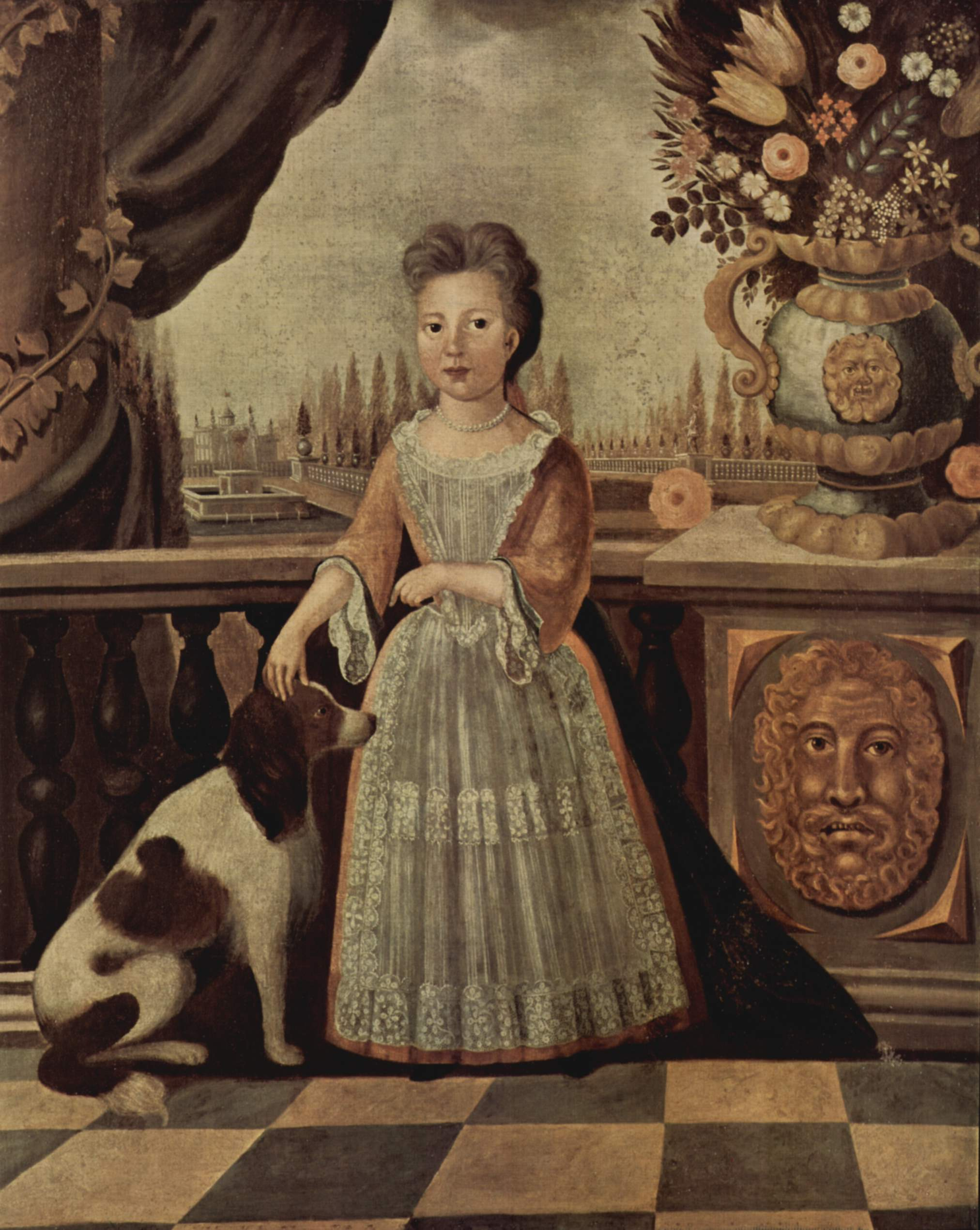
Portrait of Eleanor Darnall as a child, c.1710
