= Henry Darnall =

Irish-born planter, militia officer and politician (1645–1711)

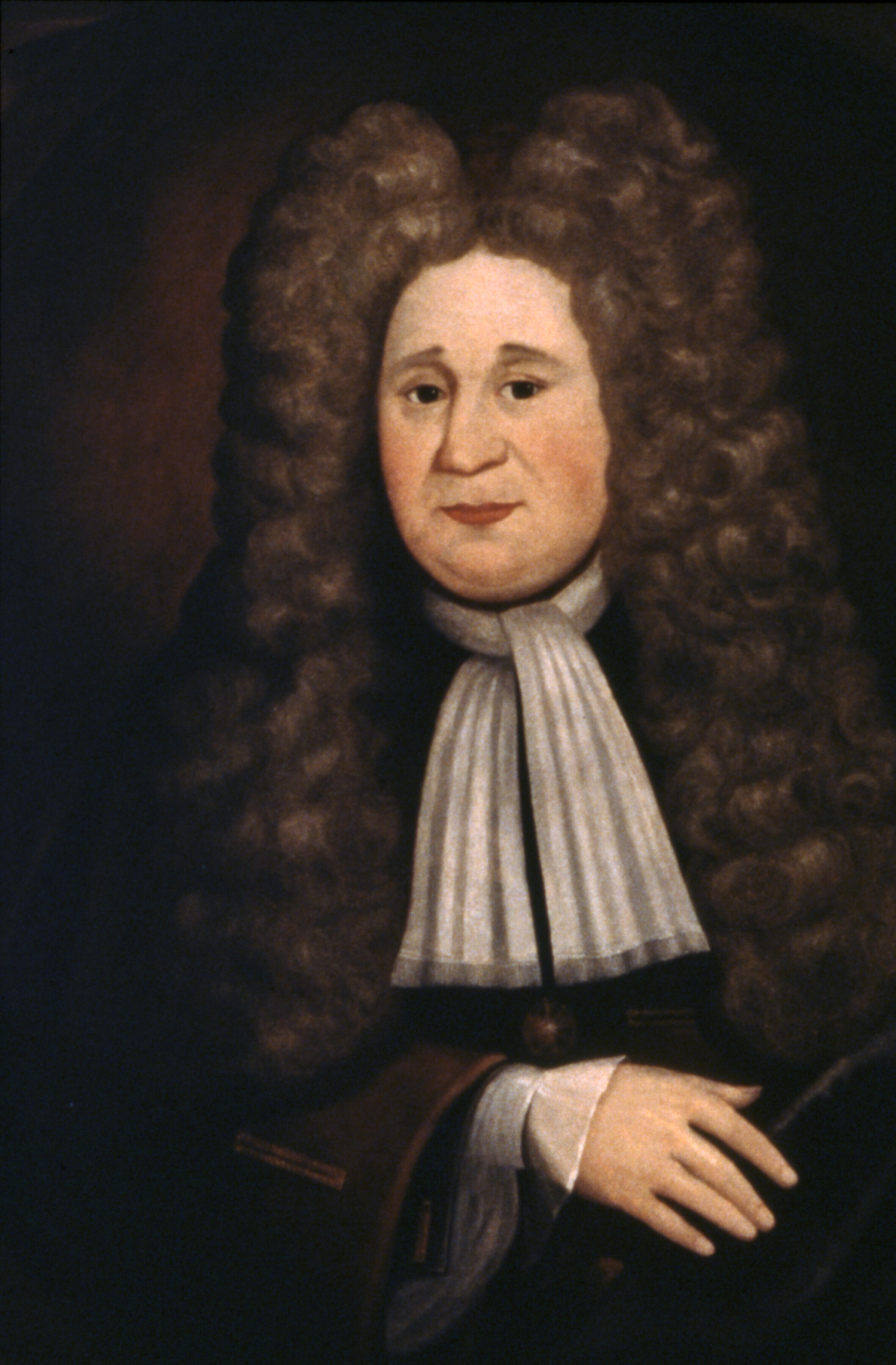
- c. 1800–1900 portrait

Chancellor of Maryland
- In office 1683–1689

Proprietary Agent and Receiver General
- In office 1684–1711

Rent Roll Keeper
- In office 1689–1699

Deputy governor of Maryland
- In office ?–1689

Personal details
- Born: 1645 Clohamon, County Wexford
- Died: 17 June 1711 (aged 66) Anne Arundel County, Maryland
- Spouse: Eleanor Hatton Brooke
- Relations: Philip Darnall (father); Mary Breton (mother); Thomas Brooke, Jr. (stepson)
- Children: 6, including Henry
- Occupation: Planter, militia officer, politician
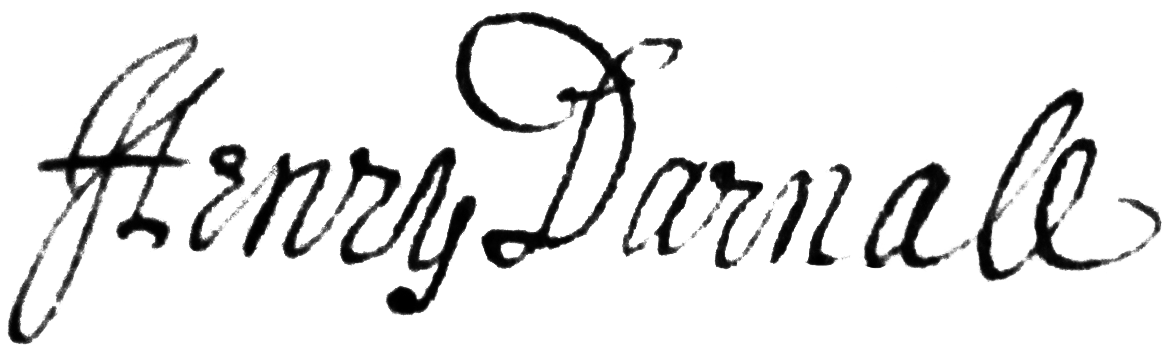
- Signature

Colonel Henry Darnall (1645 – 17 June 1711) was an Irish-born planter, militia officer and politician who served as the chancellor of Maryland from 1683 to 1689. He was also appointed as the proprietary agent for Charles Calvert, 3rd Baron Baltimore and also briefly served as deputy governor of Maryland. During the 1689 Protestant Revolution, his proprietarial army was defeated by Protestant rebels led by John Coode, and Darnall was stripped of his numerous colonial offices as a result. He died in 1711, leaving the bulk of his substantial estates to his son, Henry Darnall II.

== Early life ==
Henry Darnall was born in Clohamon, County Wexford in 1645, the son of English barrister Philip Darnall and his wife Mary, the daughter of Sir Henry Breton. Darnall was the first of his family to emigrate to England's North American colonies, and arrived in the Province of Maryland in 1664, when he was granted a tract of 236 acres in what was then Calvert County. In Maryland he became a substantial landholder and slaveholder, and married Eleanor Hatton Brooke (1642–1725), the widow of Thomas Brooke, Sr., who had died in 1676.

== Career ==
=== Public offices ===
Darnall was strongly allied to the proprietarial interest of Charles Calvert, who had married Darnall's cousin Mary. This alliance brought Darnall wealth and power, as he rapidly acquired both land and political office from his cousin's accommodating husband. Darnall's colonial appointments included: Chancellor of Maryland from 1683 to 1689; His Lordship's Agent & Receiver General from 1684 to 1711; Rent Roll Keeper, 1689 to 1699; Deputy Governor; and Colonel of the Militia. In 1703, Calvert granted Darnall 7,000 acres (28 km^{2}) of land in Prince George's County. Darnall named the estate His Lordship's Kindness in recognition of Calvert's readiness to hand out large swathes of Maryland to his relatives.

=== Protestant Revolution of 1689 ===
Darnall would not enjoy his political offices for long. In 1689, the ruling Calvert family would lose control of the province, and Darnall would forfeit all his official positions.

Maryland Puritans, by now a substantial majority in the colony, revolted against the proprietary government, in part because of the apparent preferment of Catholics to official positions of power. The Glorious Revolution of the previous year had put a Protestant King and Queen on the throne of England, but the sovereignty of the new monarchs had not yet been acknowledged in Maryland.

Rumours spread that Roman Catholics and local Indians were engaged in a conspiracy to murder Protestants. Darnall was alleged to be one of the leaders of the plot:

"Here being some discourse that was talked by the Indians Therefore it was ordered by the Commission of Stafford Court That Mr Burr Harris of this County should come to the house of John West to Examine them and the Indians doth declare that the great men of Maryland hath hired the Seneca Indians to kill the protestants nameing Coll Darnall Coll Pye, and Mr Boarman and further did sweare God Dam Mr Boarman for he is all one the Senecas And further doth declare that Mr Boarman did tell the Indians that the English would first of all kill the papists and then would kill all the Indians and did Crye to them And further doth declare that Coll Darnall Coll Pye and Mr Boareman did tell the Indians that they must make hast and kill the protestants before the shippes comes in For after the shippes come the protestants would kill all the papists and then all the Indians are hired also for that same purpose."

Darnall responded to the threat by "ranging from place to place" to convince Marylanders that such rumors were baseless. Below is an excerpt of an official letter submitted to the Deputy Governor by his allies, concerning the deposition of one John Atkey:

The Deposicon of John Atkey of Calvert County aged forty and foure yeares or thereabouts deposeth now—That on the 21st day of March 1688/9 at the house of Mr John Broome in Calverton in the said County he heard Richard Fyffe say that on Munday last being the 18th day of this instant March That William Sharpe of Talbot County tell him That when the Indians of the Easterne shoare were drunke he heard them say that they were hyred or Imployed by Coll Henry Darnall to fight against the English But being asked when they were sober they would not say any such thing And further sayth not John Atkey.

In July, the Protestant Association was formed, led by John Coode, who had previously rebelled against the Proprietary government in 1681. Coode gathered a sizeable armed force that marched on the capital, St. Mary's City, in July 1689. The Protestant Associators secured the surrender of the smaller body of Lord Baltimore's supporters without bloodshed on 27 July. The Associators pledged their allegiance to William and Mary and asked to be designated a royal, rather than a proprietary, colony."

Darnall tried to raise a body of men from the Patuxent (now known as Calvert County) to come to the defence of the capital, but was unsuccessful. He later wrote:

Wee being in this condition and no hope left of quieting or repelling the People thus enraged, to prevent effusion of blood, capitulated and surrendered. After the surrender of the said House his Lordshipp's Councill endeavoured to send an Accot of these transactions, by one Johnson master of a Ship bound for London to his Lordship the which the said Johnson delivered to Cood When wee found wee could send no Letters Majr Sewall and myself, desired of Johnson wee might have a passage in him for England to give his Lordship Accot of matters by word of mouth, which the said Johnson refused upon pretended Orders to the contrary from Cood. Whereupon Majr Sewall and myself went to Pensylvania [sic] to endeavour to get a passage there, upon which Cood and his party took occasion to give out, wee were gone to bring in the Northern Indians, but we missing of a passage there came back and stayd in Ann Arrundell County (who never had joyned with Cood nor his party) until the 26th of September when Majr Sewall then being sick I myself got a passage hither in one Everard.

Coode, never a man for temperate language, later accused Darnall of speaking "treasonable expressions" against the monarch:

Wee doubt not his Majestie has by this time (by some of the severall Papers wee have sent) account of our dutyfull and humble Petitions and Endeavours for his Service, The first wee sent were taken by the French but Captaine Thomas Everard Commander of the Thomas and Susanna wee understand is well arrived, Who had the originall address to his Majestie under the hands of the Representatives of the whole Province in a full and free convention But wee doubt the said Everard suffered the said address to be concealed or intercepted by one Colonell Henry Darnall who got on board the said Everard and went home with him to England a Person the Lord Baltemore raised from the meanest condition to be keeper of his great seale and one of the most crimminall of any of his deputies for the many treasonable endeavors and expressions against their Majesties and the many cruelities and opressions [sic] committed upon their subjects of this Province of whome and of whose behaviour in some considerable particulars of this nature one Captain William Ginnis, Captaine George Combes and Captaine Robert Goodinge can informe who sailed home last yeare without their full clearing, the said Darnall refusing to signe the same with the Collector in King William's name, with many violent and unbecoming expressions against his Royaltie ...

Darnall was required to answer to the Privy Council on the accusation of treason, which he denied:

Petition of Henry Darnell to the Privy Council. On the accusation of John Coode for alleged treasonable words against the Prince of Orange I gave bond for good behaviour. I deny the charge and pray for release from the bond. 1 p. [Illegible] Read 22 Dec., 90.

The Privy Council agreed to advise that the bail should be discharged.

== Slavery ==
Darnall used slave labor on his plantations and tobacco farms. One of these slaves was Ann Joice, a free black woman from the Caribbean who contracted as an indentured servant to Charles Calvert, 3rd Baron Baltimore, When Calvert returned to England in 1684, she was sent to work for Calvert's cousin Darnall. When Joice's contract expired, Darnall refused to honor it and burned it, condemning Joice and her descendants to slavery. Some of Joice's descendants were owned by the Jesuits and were part of the 1838 Jesuit slave sale. Two of Darnall's slaves brought unsuccessful freedom suits against him; they may have been similarly enslaved indentured servants.

== Family life ==
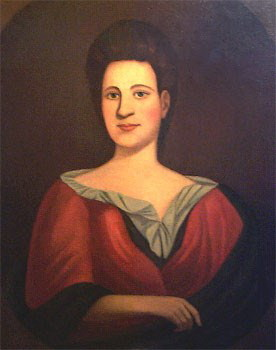
Elinor Hatton Darnall, wife of Henry Darnall, approx 1662 (exact date unknown)

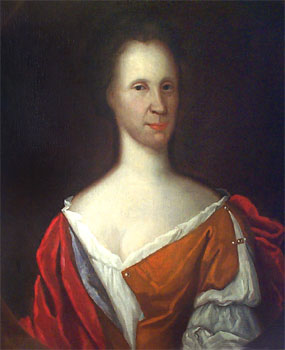
Mary Darnall, daughter of Henry Darnall

Darnall married Eleanor Hatton Brooke (1642–1725), the widow of Thomas Brooke, Sr. He had six children, named in his will:

- Henry Darnall II, married Anne Digges, daughter of William Digges and later Elizabeth Lowe.
- Philip, married Eleanor Brooke, daughter of Thomas Brooke, Sr.
- Mary, married Charles Carroll-grandparents of Charles Carroll of Carrollton
- Anne, married Clement Hill, Jr.
- Eleanor
- Elizabeth

== Death and legacy ==
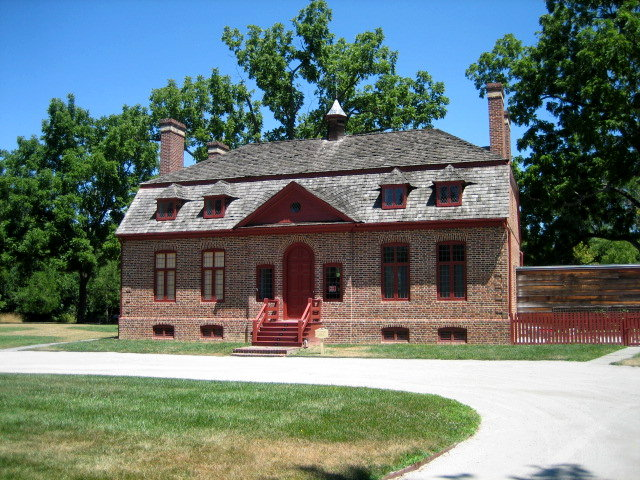
Darnall's Chance

Darnall died in 1711, stripped of his numerous offices but nonetheless extremely wealthy, having accumulated 30,000 acres (120 km^{2}) of land.

A small portion of Darnall's former property, now called Darnall's Chance, can still be visited today. The house sits on several acres of a formerly large tract of land of thousands of acres patented in 1704 by Darnall. This plot was sold in 1741 by Darnalls' granddaughter Eleanor Darnall Carroll and her husband to James Wardrop, a merchant. He built the house ca. 1742. It was restored to its mid-eighteenth century state to reflect the life of Lettice Lee, who lived there for 30 years.

Darnall's stepson, Thomas Brooke, Jr. would become Governor of Maryland in 1720, under the new Calvert Proprietorship, restored by the King in 1715.

== See also ==
- History of Maryland
- Colonial families of Maryland
