= Protestant Revolution (Maryland) =

1689 rebellion in the Province of Maryland

- Part of the Glorious Revolution
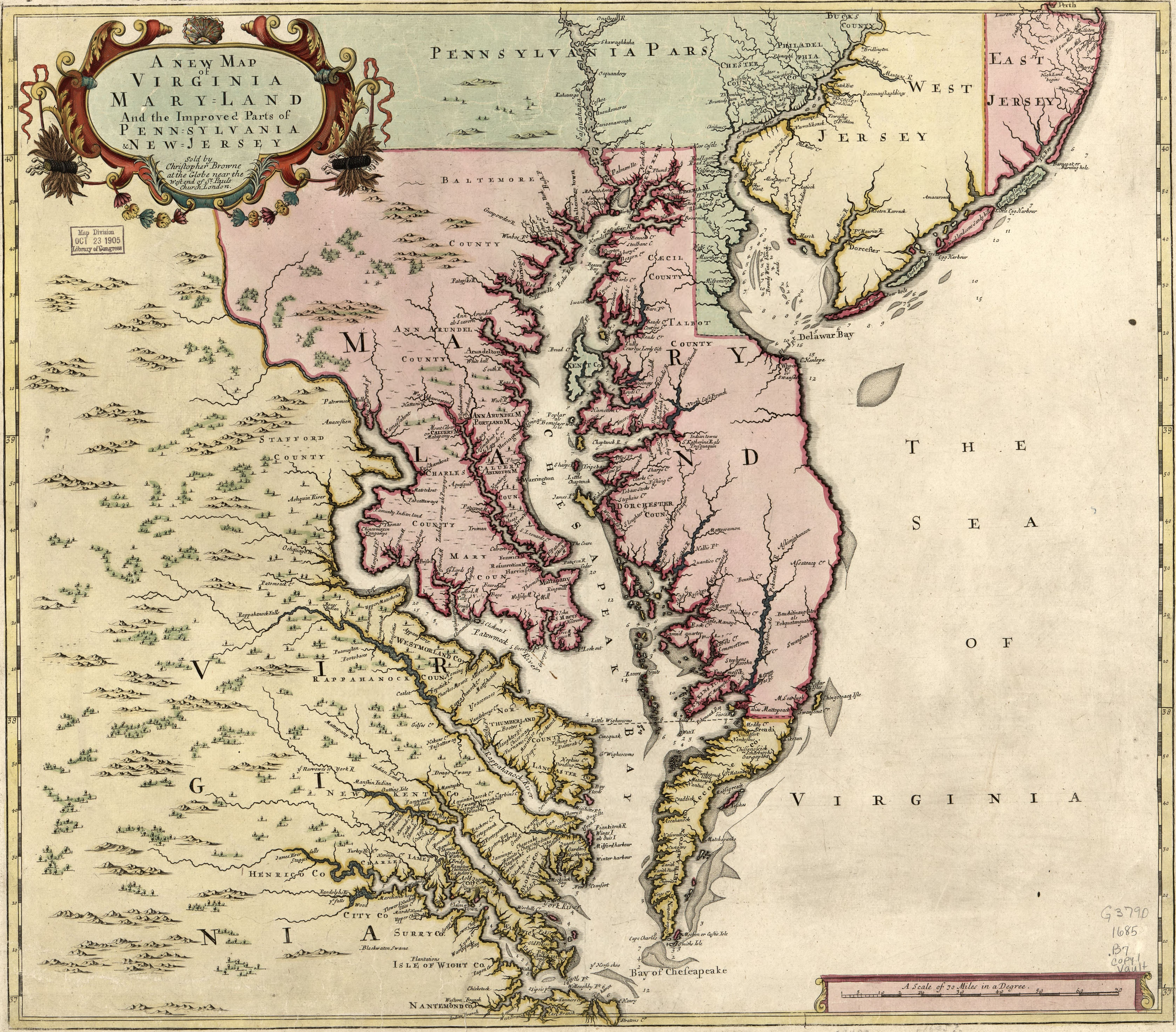
- 1685 map of Maryland
Date	1689–1692
Location	Province of Maryland
Result	Associator victory

Belligerents
Protestant Associators	Province of Maryland

Commanders and leaders
John Coode; Nehemiah Blakiston	Benedict Calvert; Henry Darnall

Strength
700	Unknown

The Protestant Revolution, also known Coode's Rebellion after one of its leaders, John Coode, took place in the summer of 1689 in the English Province of Maryland when Protestants, by then a substantial majority in the colony, revolted against the proprietary government led by the Catholic Charles Calvert, 3rd Baron Baltimore.

The rebellion followed the "Glorious Revolution" in England of 1688, which saw the Protestant monarchs William III and Mary II replace the English Catholic monarch King James II. The Lords Baltimore lost control of their proprietary colony, and for the next 25 years, Maryland would be ruled directly by the Crown.

The Protestant Revolution also saw the effective end of Maryland's early experiments with religious toleration, as Catholicism was outlawed and Catholics forbidden from holding public office. Religious toleration would not be restored in Maryland until after the American Revolution.

== Events leading to the Protestant Revolution of 1689 ==
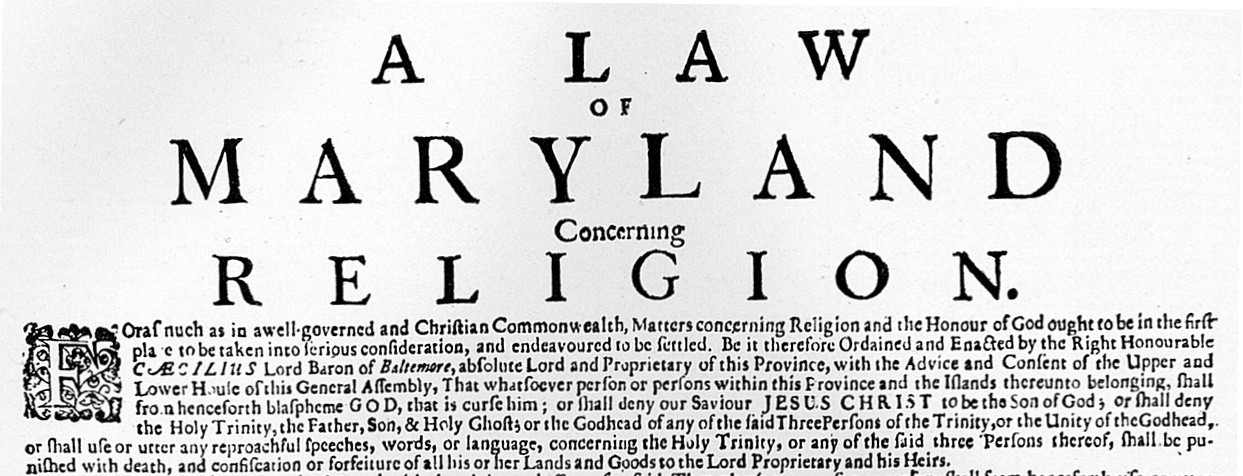
The Maryland Toleration Act of 1649 allowed Catholics freedom of worship for 40 years

Maryland had long practiced an uneasy form of religious tolerance among different groups of Christians. In 1649, Maryland passed the Maryland Toleration Act, also known as the Act Concerning Religion, a law mandating religious tolerance for trinitarian Christians. Passed on April 21, 1649, by the assembly of the Maryland colony, it was the first law requiring religious tolerance in the British North American colonies.

The Calvert family, who had founded Maryland partly as a refuge for English Catholics, sought enactment of the law to protect Catholic settlers and those of other religions that did not conform to the dominant Anglicanism of England and her colonies.

=== Economic problems ===
Charles Calvert's rule as governor was aggravated by growing economic problems. From the 1660s onwards, the price of tobacco, the staple crop of Maryland and its chief source of export income, began a long slide, causing economic hardship especially among the poor.

In 1666, neighbouring Virginia proposed a "stint" on tobacco growing – a one-year moratorium that would lower supply and so drive up prices. Calvert initially agreed to this plan, but came to realize that the burden of the stint would fall chiefly upon his poorest subjects, who comprised "the generality of the province". Eventually, he vetoed the bill, much to the disgust of the Virginians, though in the end Nature provided a stint of her own in the form of a hurricane which devastated the 1667 tobacco crop.

=== Religious problems ===
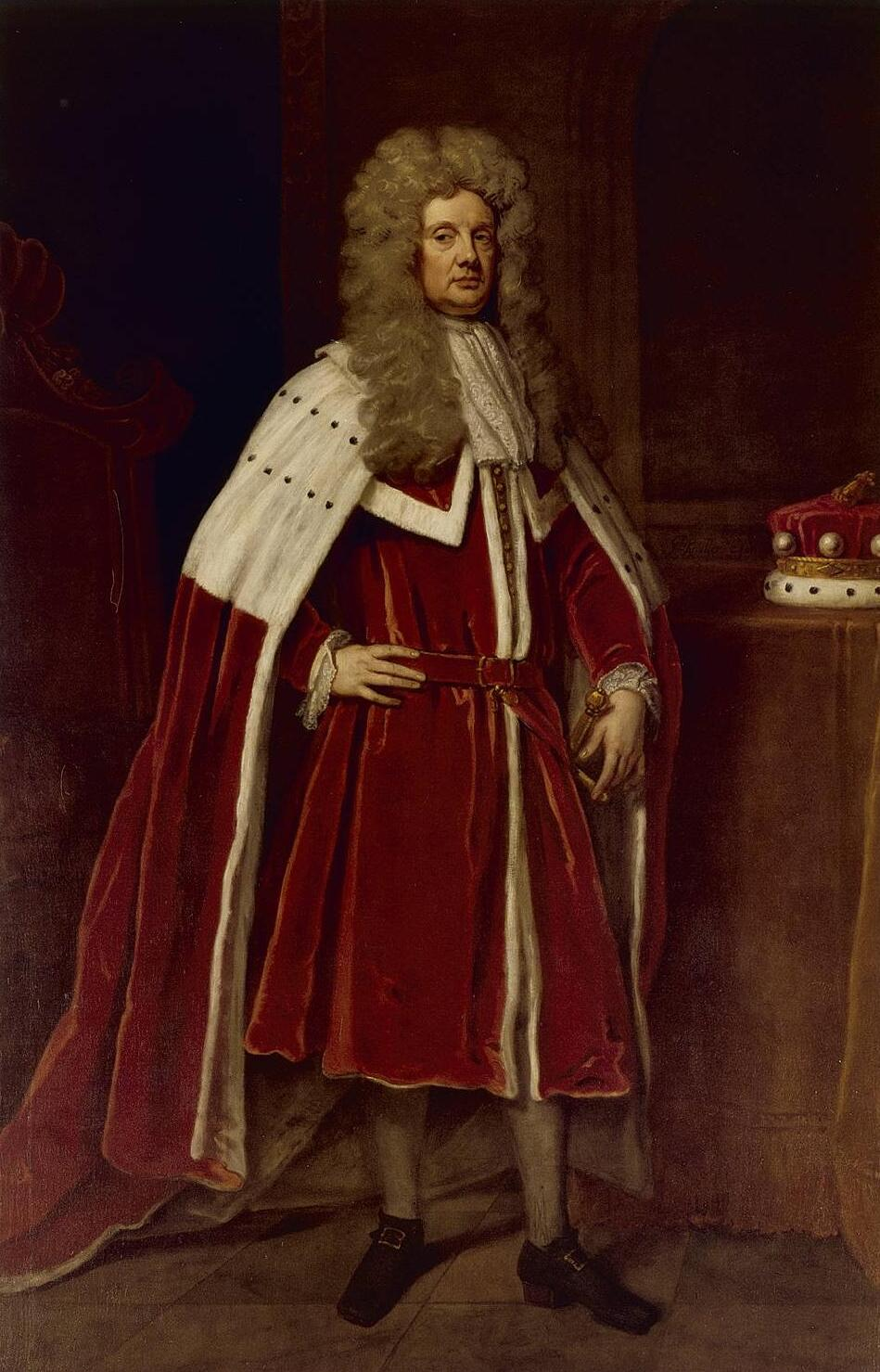
Charles Calvert, 3rd Baron Baltimore, painted by John Closterman.

By the time Charles Calvert became governor, the population of the province had gradually shifted due to immigration, becoming, in time, an overwhelmingly Protestant British colony. Political power, however, tended to remain concentrated in the hands of the largely Roman Catholic elite. In spite of this demographic shift away from Catholicism, Calvert attempted to preserve Maryland's Catholic identity.

From 1669–1689, of 27 men who sat on the Governor's Council, just eight were Protestant. Most councillors were Catholics, and many were related by blood or marriage to the Calverts, enjoying political patronage and often lucrative offices such as commands in the militia or sinecures in the Land Office. In response, Maryland Protestants quickly organized into anti-Catholic militias, known as "associators".

=== Armed conflict ===
Much conflict between Calvert and his subjects turned on the question of how far English law should be applied in Maryland and to what degree the proprietary government might exercise its own prerogative outside of the law. Delegates to the assembly wished to establish the "full force and power" of the law, but Calvert, ever protective of his prerogative, insisted that only he and his councillors might decide where and when English law should apply. Such uncertainty could and did permit the charge of arbitrary government.

Calvert acted in various ways to restrain the influence of the Protestant majority. In 1670, he restricted suffrage to men who owned 50 acres (200,000 m^{2}) or more or held property worth more than 40 pounds. He also restricted election to Maryland's House of Delegates to those who owned at least 1,000 acres (400 ha) of land.

In 1676, he directed the voters to return half as many delegates to the assembly, two instead of four. Measures like these might make the assembly easier to manage, but they tended to strain relations between Calvert and his subjects.

=== Religious conflicts ===
In 1675, the elder Lord Baltimore died, and Charles Calvert, now 38 years old, returned to London in order to be elevated to his barony. His political enemies took the opportunity of his absence to launch a scathing attack on the proprietorial government, publishing a pamphlet in 1676 titled A Complaint from Heaven with a Hue and Crye ... out of Maryland and Virginia, listing numerous grievances and in particular complaining of the lack of an established church.

Neither was the Church of England happy with Maryland's experiment in religious tolerance. The Anglican minister John Yeo wrote scathingly to the Archbishop of Canterbury, complaining that Maryland was "in a deplorable condition" and had become "a sodom of uncleanliness and a pesthouse of iniquity". This was taken sufficiently seriously in London that the Privy Council directed Calvert to respond to the complaints made against him.

Calvert's response to these challenges was defiant. He hanged two of the would-be rebels and moved to re-assert Maryland's religious diversity. His written response illustrates the difficulties facing his administration; Calvert wrote that Maryland settlers were "Presbyterians, Independents, Anabaptists, and Quakers, those of the Church of England as well as the Romish being the fewest ...It would be a most difficult task to draw such persons to consent unto a Law which shall compel them to maintaine ministers of a contrary perswasion to themselves".

=== Protestant conspiracies ===
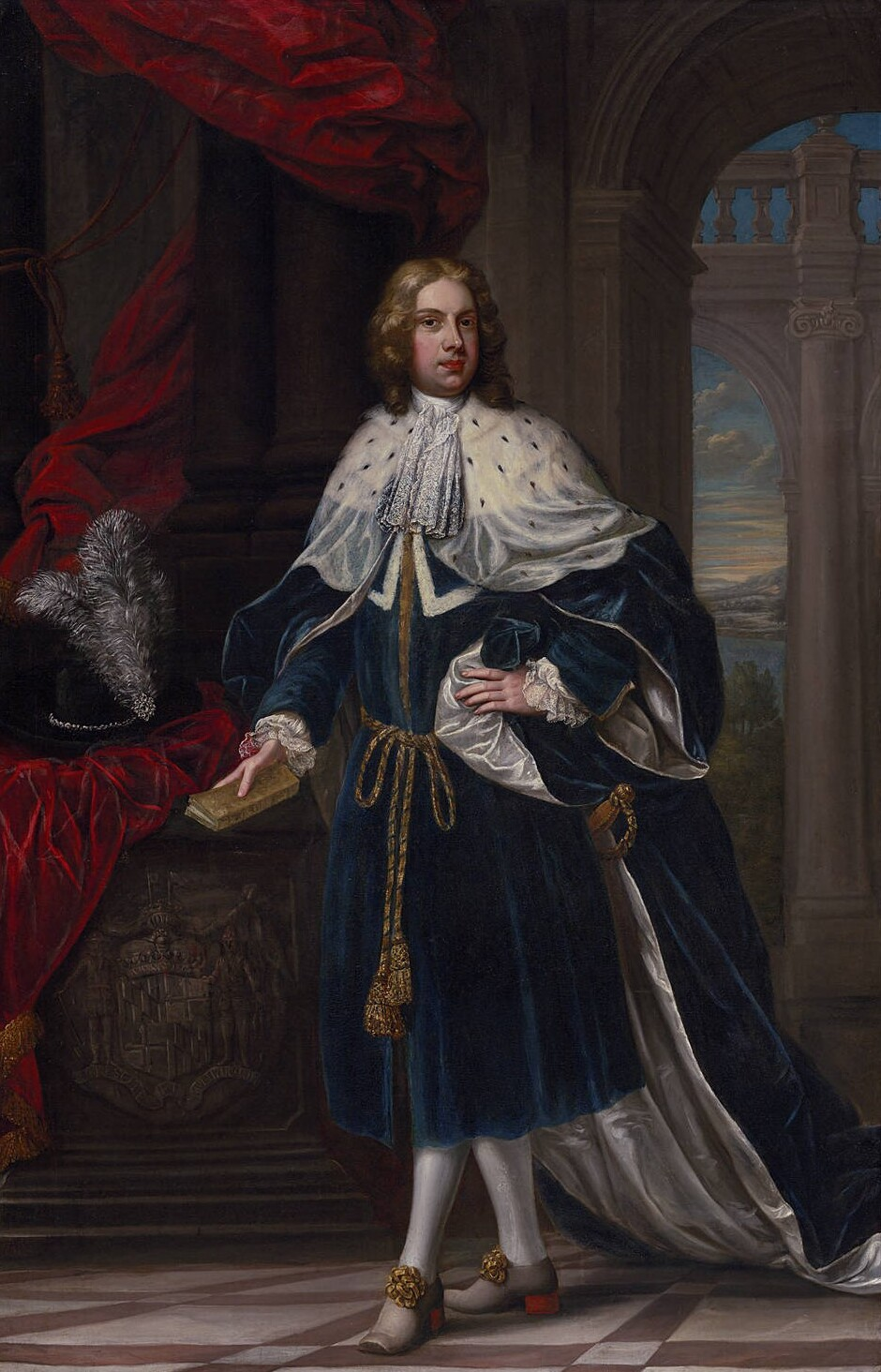
Benedict Calvert, second son of Charles Calvert, who would later become the 4th Baron Baltimore

In 1679, Charles and Jane celebrated a second son, Benedict. But two years later, in 1681, Lord Baltimore once again faced rebellion, led by a former governor of the province Josias Fendall (1657–1660) and John Coode, who would later lead the successful rebellion of 1689. Fendall was tried, convicted, fined forty thousand pounds of tobacco and exiled, but his co-conspirator Coode successfully escaped retribution.

By this time, the political fabric of the province was starting to tear. The governor of Virginia reported that "Maryland is now in torment ... and in great danger of falling in pieces". Relations between the governing council and the assembly grew increasingly strained. Underlying much of the rancour was the continued slide in the price of tobacco, which by the 1680s had fallen 50% in 30 years. In 1681 Baltimore also faced personal tragedy; his eldest son and heir, Cecil, died leaving his second son Benedict as the heir presumptive to the Calvert inheritance.

=== Lord Baltimore's departure for England ===
In 1684, Baltimore travelled to England, both to defend himself in the dispute with Penn as well as to answer charges that he favoured Catholics in the colony. He would never return to Maryland.

Calvert left the province in the care of his nephew George Talbot, whom he made acting governor, placing him at the head of the Governor's Council. Unfortunately Talbot proved to be a poor choice, stabbing to death a Royal customs official on board his ship in the Patuxent River, and thereby ensuring that his uncle suffered immediate difficulties on his return to London.

Calvert's replacement for Talbot was another Roman Catholic, William Joseph, who would also prove controversial. In November 1688, Joseph set about offending local opinion by lecturing his Maryland subjects on morality, adultery and the divine right of kings, lambasting the colony as "a land full of adulterers".

=== The Glorious Revolution and English Bill of Rights ===
In England, events now began to move decisively against the Calverts and their political interests. In 1688, the country underwent what would later become known as the Glorious Revolution, during which the Catholic King James II of England was deposed and the Protestant monarchs King William and Mary II of England were installed on the throne. This triumph of the Protestant faction would cause Calvert considerable political difficulties.

Sensibly, Calvert moved quickly to support the new regime, sending a messenger to Maryland to proclaim the new King and Queen. Unfortunately for Lord Baltimore, the messenger died during the journey, and a second envoy – if one was ever sent, as Calvert would later claim that it was – never arrived.

While the other colonies in quick succession proclaimed the new sovereigns, Maryland hesitated. The delay was fatal to Baltimore's charter, and in 1691 Maryland became a royal province. Baltimore, however, was still permitted to receive the revenues in the form of quitrents and excises from his sometime colony. Maryland remained a royal colony till 1715, when it passed back into the hands of the Calverts.

== 1689 Protestant Revolution in Province of Maryland ==
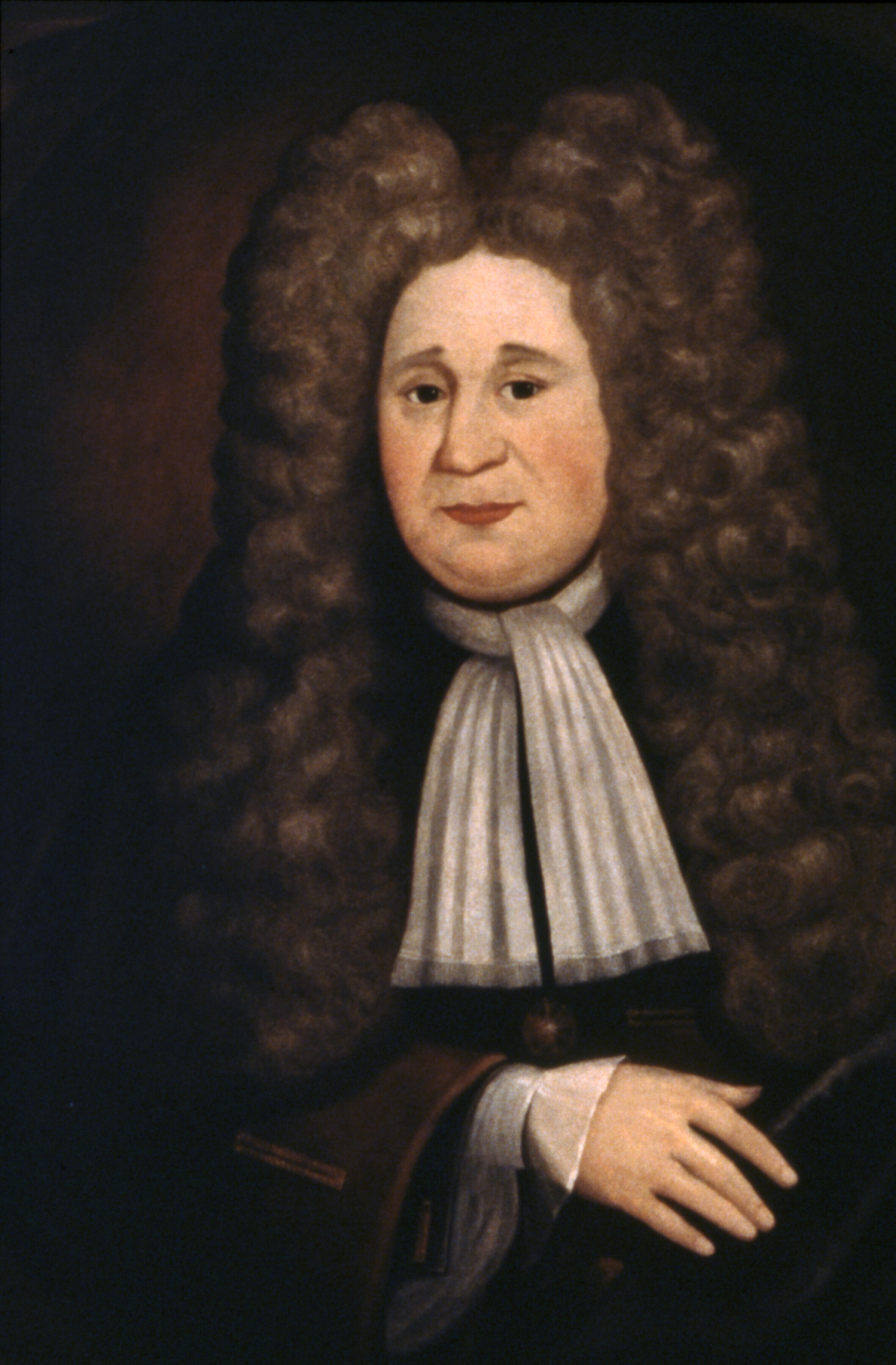
Henry Darnall, Deputy Governor of Maryland, was overthrown in 1689

Meanwhile, Maryland Protestants, by now a substantial majority in the colony, feeding on rumors from England and fearing Catholic plots, began to organize rebellion against the proprietary government. Governor Joseph did not improve the situation by refusing to convene the assembly and, ominously, recalling weapons from storage, ostensibly for repair.

Protestants, angry at the apparent lack of official support for the new King and Queen, and resentful of the preferment of Catholics like deputy governor and planter Colonel Henry Darnall to official positions of power, began to arm themselves. In the summer of 1689, an army of seven hundred Protestant citizen soldiers, led by Colonel John Coode and known as "Protestant Associators", defeated a proprietarial army, led by the Catholic planter. Darnall, heavily outnumbered, later wrote: "Wee being in this condition and no hope left of quieting the people thus enraged, to prevent effusion of blood, capitulated and surrendered."

After this "Glorious Protestant Revolution" in Maryland, the victorious Coode and his Protestant allies set up a new government that outlawed Catholicism; Catholics would thereafter be forced to maintain secret chapels in their home in order to celebrate the Mass. In 1704, an Act was passed "to prevent the growth of Popery in this Province", preventing Catholics from holding political office.

John Coode would remain in power until the new royal governor, Nehemiah Blakiston, was appointed on July 27, 1691. Charles Calvert himself would never return to Maryland, and worse, his family's royal charter to the colony was withdrawn in 1689. Henceforth, Maryland would be administered directly by the Crown.

== Legacy ==
The Protestant Revolution ended Maryland's experiment with religious toleration. Religious laws were backed up with harsh sanctions. In the early 18th century Marylanders who "should utter any profane words concerning the Holy Trinity" would find themselves "bored through the tongue and fined twenty pounds" for a first offence. Maryland established the Church of England as its official church in 1702 and barred Catholics from voting in 1718.

Full religious toleration would not be restored in Maryland until the American Revolution, when Darnall's great-grandson Charles Carroll of Carrollton, arguably the wealthiest Catholic in Maryland, signed the American Declaration of Independence.

== See also ==
- 1689 Boston revolt
- Leisler's Rebellion

== Bibliography ==
- Brugger, R. J. (1996). Maryland, a Middle Temperament: 1634–1980. Baltimore: JHU Press. ISBN 9780801854651.
- Finkelman, P. (2006). The Encyclopedia of American Civil Liberties: A–F. Milton Park: Taylor & Francis. ISBN 9780415943420.
- Hoffman, R. (2002). Princes of Ireland, Planters of Maryland: A Carroll Saga, 1500–1782. Chapel Hill: UNC Press. ISBN 9780807853474.
- Sutto, A. (2015). Loyal Protestants and Dangerous Papists. Charlottesville: University of Virginia Press. ISBN 9780813937489.
