= List of counties in Maryland =

Independent city and counties of Maryland
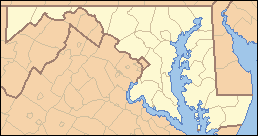
- Location: State of Maryland
- Number: 23 counties and 1 Independent city
- Populations: (Counties only): 19,565 (Kent) – 1,074,582 (Montgomery)
- Areas: (Counties only): 254 square miles (660 km^{2}) (Howard) – 983 square miles (2,550 km^{2}) (Dorchester)
- Government: County government
- Subdivisions: (Counties): cities, towns, unincorporated communities, census-designated places (Independent city): Neighborhoods

There are 23 counties and one independent city in the U.S. state of Maryland. Many of the counties in Maryland were named for relatives of the Barons Baltimore, who were the proprietors of the Maryland colony from its founding in 1634 through 1771. The Barons Baltimore were Catholic, and George Calvert, 1st Baron Baltimore, originally intended that the colony be a haven for English Catholics, though for most of its history Maryland has had a majority of Protestants.

Though formally an independent city rather than a county, the City of Baltimore is considered the equal of a county for most purposes and is functionally a county-equivalent in most respects.

== History ==
The most recent county formation in Maryland occurred in 1872 when Garrett County was split from Allegany County. However, there have been numerous changes to county borders since that time, most recently when portions of the city of Takoma Park that had previously been part of Prince George's County were absorbed into Montgomery County in 1997.

Within Maryland the county is the default unit of local government. Under Maryland law, counties exercise powers reserved in most other states at the municipal or state levels. Many of the state's most populous and economically important communities, such as Bethesda, Silver Spring, Columbia, and Towson are unincorporated and receive their municipal services from the county. In fact, there are no incorporated municipalities at all in Baltimore County or Howard County. The county-equivalent is also the provider of public schools as school districts do not exist as a separate level of government in Maryland.

The City of Baltimore is an entity nearly surrounded by but separate from the County of Baltimore. The City has been considered on par with the counties within the state since it became an independent city after it separated from Baltimore County in 1851.

The Federal Information Processing Standard (FIPS) code, which is used by the United States government to uniquely identify states and counties, is provided with each entry. Maryland's code is 24, which when combined with any county code would be written as 24XXX. The FIPS code for each county links to census data for that county.

== List of counties ==
County	FIPS code	County seat	Est.	Origin	Etymology	Flag	Seal	Population (2025)	Area	Map
Allegany County	001	Cumberland	December 29, 1789	Formed from part of Washington County	From Lenape oolikhanna, which means "beautiful stream"	A blue flag with the county seal in the center	A round seal divided into asymmetric quadrants, each with various symbols	66,848	430 sq mi (1,114 km^{2})	State map highlighting Allegany County
Anne Arundel County	003	Annapolis	April 29, 1650	Formed from part of St. Mary's County	Anne Arundell was the maiden name of the wife of Cecil Calvert, 2nd Baron Baltimore. Between 1654 and 1658 it was known as Providence County by Puritan settlers	A white flag with the county seal in the center	An oval seal featuring a shield with heraldic symbols	603,380	588 sq mi (1,523 km^{2})	State map highlighting Anne Arundel County
Baltimore County	005	Towson	January 12, 1660	Formed from unorganized territory	Cecil Calvert, 2nd Baron Baltimore, first proprietor of the Maryland colony	A flag with black-and-yellow patterns at top left and bottom right, a red plow on white at top right, and a red cog on white at bottom left	A round seal with black-and-yellow patterns on top left and bottom right and red-and-white patterns on top right and bottom left	847,650	682 sq mi (1,766 km^{2})	State map highlighting Baltimore County
Baltimore City	510	Baltimore City	July 4, 1851	Founded in 1729. Detached in 1851 from Baltimore County	Cecil Calvert, 2nd Baron Baltimore, first proprietor of the Maryland colony	A flag with a black-and-yellow pattern and a black shield with a monumental column in the center	An oval seal featuring a monumental column on a yellow background	569,997	92 sq mi (238 km^{2})	State map highlighting Baltimore City
Calvert County	009	Prince Frederick	July 3, 1654	Formed as Patuxent County from unorganized territory. Renamed Calvert County in 1658	The Calvert family; prior to 1658 it was called Patuxent County, after the Patuxent Indians, a branch of the Algonquians	A flag with a black-and-yellow pattern and a green leaf in the center	A round seal featuring a cornucopia on a white background	94,484	345 sq mi (894 km^{2})	State map highlighting Calvert County
Caroline County	011	Denton	March 15, 1774	From parts of Dorchester County and Queen Anne's County	Lady Caroline Eden, daughter of Charles Calvert, 5th Baron Baltimore	A green flag with the county seal on the left side	A roughly oval seal with heraldic elements surrounded by a tan border	34,116	326 sq mi (844 km^{2})	State map highlighting Caroline County
Carroll County	013	Westminster	January 19, 1836	From parts of Baltimore County and Frederick County	Charles Carroll of Carrollton, a representative to the Continental Congress and signatory of the Declaration of Independence	A white flag with a blue border on three sides and the county seal in the center	A round seal featuring a horse-drawn wagon and a red-and-blue border	176,677	452 sq mi (1,171 km^{2})	State map highlighting Carroll County
Cecil County	015	Elkton	June 6, 1674	From parts of Baltimore County and Kent County	Cecil is an Anglicized form of the first name of Cecil Calvert, 2nd Baron Baltimore	A flag with a red stripe to the left and a white stripe with a seal to the right	A diamond seal depicting ducks flying over the coast and a red border	107,131	418 sq mi (1,083 km^{2})	State map highlighting Cecil County
Charles County	017	La Plata	April 13, 1658	From unorganized territory	Charles Calvert, 3rd Baron Baltimore, second proprietor of the Maryland colony	A yellow flag with a black border and the county seal in the center	An oval seal featuring a shield with heraldic symbols on a blue background	176,593	643 sq mi (1,665 km^{2})	State map highlighting Charles County
Dorchester County	019	Cambridge	February 16, 1669	From unorganized territory	Dorchester in Dorset, England; the Earl of Dorset was a friend of the Calvert family	A light blue flag with the county seal in the center	A round seal with a shield, two figures flanking the shield, and a gold border	33,628	983 sq mi (2,546 km^{2})	State map highlighting Dorchester County
Frederick County	021	Frederick	December 10, 1748	From part of Prince George's County	Frederick Calvert, 6th Baron Baltimore, final proprietor of the Maryland colony	A flag with yellow, red, black, and white quadrants	A round seal depicting a farmer in the countryside with a red border	302,883	667 sq mi (1,728 km^{2})	State map highlighting Frederick County
Garrett County	023	Oakland	December 4, 1872	From part of Allegany County	John Work Garrett, president of the Baltimore and Ohio Railroad	A white flag with the county seal in the center	A rounded rectangle seal with blue-and-green quadrants depicting natural scenes	28,370	656 sq mi (1,699 km^{2})	State map highlighting Garrett County
Harford County	025	Bel Air	March 2, 1774	From part of Baltimore County	Henry Harford, illegitimate son of Frederick Calvert, 6th Baron Baltimore	A blue flag with a seal in the center	A round seal featuring a blue-and-gold shield and ribbon with a blue border	266,446	527 sq mi (1,365 km^{2})	State map highlighting Harford County
Howard County	027	Ellicott City	July 4, 1851	From parts of Anne Arundel County and Baltimore County	John Eager Howard, an American Revolutionary War officer and governor of Maryland	A flag with a cross dividing it into red-and-white quadrants, wheat at top left, and an outline of the county inside a triangle at bottom right	A round seal featuring a sheaf of grain in a field with a white border	339,183	254 sq mi (658 km^{2})	State map highlighting Howard County
Kent County	029	Chestertown	August 2, 1642	From unorganized territory	The English county of Kent	A blue flag with a seal in the center	A round seal featuring heraldic symbols on a blue background with a dark blue border	19,565	414 sq mi (1,072 km^{2})	State map highlighting Kent County
Montgomery County	031	Rockville	October 2, 1776	From part of Frederick County	Richard Montgomery, an American Revolutionary War general	A flag with fleurs-de-lis on blue at top left and bottom right, and rings on red at top right and bottom left	A round seal with a seal depicting a similar pattern to the flag on a white background	1,074,582	507 sq mi (1,313 km^{2})	State map highlighting Montgomery County
Prince George's County	033	Upper Marlboro	April 23, 1696	From parts of Calvert County and Charles County	Prince George of Denmark, the husband of Queen Anne of Great Britain	A white flag spanned by a red cross with the county seal at top left	A roughly rectangular seal featuring heraldic elements on a purple background with a white border	970,374	498 sq mi (1,290 km^{2})	State map highlighting Prince George's County
Queen Anne's County	035	Centreville	May 1, 1706	From parts of Talbot County	Anne, Queen of Great Britain	A white flag with the county seal in the center	A round seal featuring heraldic elements on a blue-and-purple background with a yellow border	54,448	510 sq mi (1,321 km^{2})	State map highlighting Queen Anne's County
Somerset County	039	Princess Anne	August 22, 1666	From unorganized territory.	Mary, Lady Somerset, sister-in-law of Cecil Calvert, 2nd Baron Baltimore	A blue flag with a red cross, a white diagonal cross, and a woman's head facing left in the center	An oval seal featuring a shield on a yellow background with a blue border	24,973	611 sq mi (1,582 km^{2})	State map highlighting Somerset County
St. Mary's County	037	Leonardtown	January 24, 1638	From unorganized territory. Was named Potomac County between 1654 and 1658.	The Virgin Mary, first county named in a colony intended to be a haven for Catholics	A red flag with the county seal in the center	A round seal featuring heraldic elements on a blue background with a gold border	116,692	611 sq mi (1,582 km^{2})	State map highlighting St. Mary's County
Talbot County	041	Easton	February 18, 1662	From part of Kent County	Grace, Lady Talbot, sister of Cecil Calvert, 2nd Baron Baltimore	A purple flag with the county seal in the center	A round seal featuring a long on a shield and ribbon against a purple background with a white border	38,238	477 sq mi (1,235 km^{2})	State map highlighting Talbot County
Washington County	043	Hagerstown	October 2, 1776	From part of Frederick County	George Washington, first President of the United States	Flag of Washington County, Maryland	A round seal with a black-and-white depiction of a factory and the county outline	157,731	468 sq mi (1,212 km^{2})	State map highlighting Washington County
Wicomico County	045	Salisbury	October 5, 1867	From parts of Somerset County and Worcester County	The Wicomico River; in Lenape, wicko mekee indicated "a place where houses are built", possibly in reference to a settlement	A light blue flag with the county seal in the center and a white horizontal stripe	A round seal featuring a Native American and the county outline on a yellow background with a white-and-red border	106,899	400 sq mi (1,036 km^{2})	State map highlighting Wicomico County
Worcester County	047	Snow Hill	December 10, 1742	From part of Somerset County	Mary Arundell, the wife of Sir John Somerset, son of Henry Somerset, 1st Marquess of Worcester, and sister of Anne Arundell, the wife of Cecil Calvert, 2nd Baron Baltimore	A dark blue flag with a red cross spanning it and two crossed arrows in the center	A round seal featuring a yellow-and-black shield on a blue background with a white-and-yellow border	54,459	695 sq mi (1,800 km^{2})	State map highlighting Worcester County

== Racial / Ethnic Profile of counties in Maryland (2020 Census) ==
Racial / Ethnic Profile of counties in Maryland (2020 Census)
Following is a table of counties in Maryland by race/ethnicity. The majority racial/ethnic group is coded per the key below.

Majority minority with no dominant group
Majority White
Majority Black
Majority Hispanic
Majority Asian
Majority Native American

Racial and ethnic composition of counties in Maryland (2020 Census) (NH = Non-Hispanic) Note: the US Census treats Hispanic/Latino as an ethnic category. This table excludes Latinos from the racial categories and assigns them to a separate category. Hispanics/Latinos may be of any race.
County	Location of County	Total Population	White alone (NH)	%	Black or African American alone (NH)	%	Native American or Alaska Native alone (NH)	%	Asian alone (NH)	%	Pacific Islander alone (NH)	%	Other race alone (NH)	%	Mixed race or Multiracial (NH)	%	Hispanic or Latino (any race)	%
Allegany		68,106	57,953	85.09%	5,286	7.76%	115	0.17%	733	1.08%	22	0.03%	185	0.27%	2,663	3.91%	1,149	1.69%
Anne Arundel		588,261	367,893	62.54%	102,555	17.43%	1,178	0.20%	25,187	4.28%	411	0.07%	3,118	0.53%	31,123	5.29%	56,796	9.65%
Baltimore		854,535	443,263	51.87%	252,724	29.57%	1,942	0.23%	54,701	6.40%	252	0.03%	4,461	0.52%	35,700	4.18%	61,492	7.20%
Calvert		92,783	68,760	74.11%	11,922	12.85%	207	0.22%	1,549	1.67%	74	0.08%	406	0.44%	5,663	6.10%	4,202	4.53%
Caroline		33,293	24,114	72.43%	4,368	13.12%	67	0.20%	345	1.04%	13	0.04%	102	0.31%	1,464	4.40%	2,820	8.47%
Carroll		172,891	146,701	84.85%	6,361	3.68%	268	0.16%	3,766	2.18%	36	0.02%	601	0.35%	7,413	4.29%	7,745	4.48%
Cecil		103,725	83,485	80.49%	7,500	7.23%	231	0.22%	1,232	1.19%	23	0.02%	408	0.39%	5,396	5.20%	5,450	5.25%
Charles		166,617	56,832	34.11%	80,850	48.52%	995	0.60%	5,624	3.38%	147	0.09%	957	0.57%	9,535	5.72%	11,677	7.01%
Dorchester		32,531	19,891	61.14%	9,017	27.72%	91	0.28%	355	1.09%	6	0.02%	130	0.40%	1,264	3.89%	1,777	5.46%
Frederick		271,717	183,636	67.58%	27,007	9.94%	401	0.15%	13,427	4.94%	154	0.06%	1,445	0.53%	13,528	4.98%	32,119	11.82%
Garrett		28,806	27,402	95.13%	239	0.83%	33	0.11%	82	0.28%	2	0.01%	54	0.19%	673	2.34%	321	1.11%
Harford		260,924	186,984	71.66%	36,837	14.12%	442	0.17%	8,094	3.10%	178	0.07%	1,211	0.46%	13,171	5.05%	14,007	5.37%
Howard		332,317	155,236	46.71%	64,018	19.26%	461	0.14%	66,073	19.88%	114	0.03%	2,213	0.67%	16,840	5.07%	27,362	8.23%
Kent		19,198	14,384	74.92%	2,751	14.33%	24	0.13%	250	1.30%	0	0.00%	62	0.32%	666	3.47%	1,061	5.53%
Montgomery		1,062,061	430,980	40.58%	192,714	18.15%	1,377	0.13%	162,472	15.30%	440	0.04%	8,589	0.81%	48,080	4.53%	217,409	20.47%
Prince George's		967,201	109,060	11.28%	571,866	59.13%	1,887	0.20%	41,436	4.28%	335	0.03%	5,746	0.59%	31,408	3.25%	205,463	21.24%
Queen Anne's		49,874	41,782	83.78%	2,775	5.56%	63	0.13%	587	1.18%	11	0.02%	190	0.38%	1,928	3.87%	2,538	5.09%
St. Mary's		113,777	80,233	70.52%	15,994	14.06%	318	0.28%	3,301	2.90%	86	0.08%	533	0.47%	6,767	5.95%	6,545	5.75%
Somerset		24,620	12,886	52.34%	9,449	38.38%	80	0.32%	250	1.02%	1	0.00%	69	0.28%	810	3.29%	1,075	4.37%
Talbot		37,526	28,065	74.79%	4,186	11.15%	45	0.12%	536	1.43%	11	0.03%	162	0.43%	1,169	3.12%	3,352	8.93%
Washington		154,705	115,223	74.48%	17,241	11.14%	253	0.16%	3,083	1.99%	63	0.04%	731	0.47%	7,822	5.06%	10,289	6.65%
Wicomico		103,588	60,340	58.25%	27,586	26.63%	212	0.20%	3,120	3.01%	39	0.04%	443	0.43%	4,757	4.59%	7,091	6.85%
Worcester		52,460	41,383	78.88%	6,166	11.75%	87	0.17%	739	1.41%	5	0.01%	166	0.32%	1,836	3.50%	2,078	3.96%
Baltimore		585,708	157,286	26.85%	335,615	57.30%	1,278	0.22%	21,020	3.59%	152	0.03%	3,332	0.57%	21,088	3.60%	45,927	7.84%

== See also ==
- List of municipalities in Maryland
- List of census-designated places in Maryland
- Maryland statistical areas
- List of ghost towns in Maryland
