= List of proprietors of Maryland =

Proprietor of Maryland
- Status: Abolished
- Formation: 15 April 1632
- First holder: Cecil Calvert, 2nd Baron Baltimore
- Final holder: Henry Harford
- Abolished: 4 July 1776

The Province of Maryland was a proprietary colony, in the hands of the Calvert family, who held it from 1633 to 1689, and again from 1715 to 1776. George Calvert, 1st Baron Baltimore (1580–1632) is often regarded as the founder of Maryland, but he died before the colony could be organized.

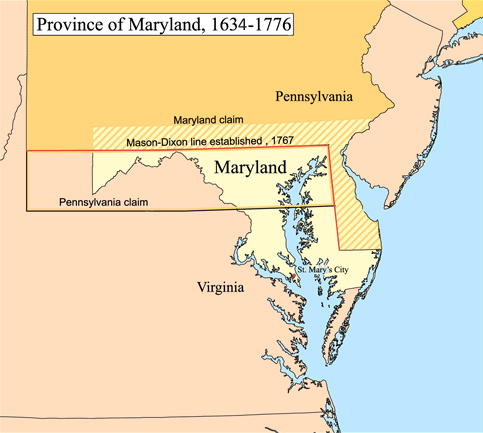
The Province of Maryland.

No.	Proprietor	Term
1	Cecil Calvert, 2nd Baron Baltimore (1605–1675)	15 April 1632 – 30 November 1675
2	Charles Calvert, 3rd Baron Baltimore (1637–1715)	30 November 1675 – 1689
Vacant
3	Charles Calvert, 5th Baron Baltimore (1699–1751)	16 April 1715 – 24 April 1751
4	Frederick Calvert, 6th Baron Baltimore (1731–1771)	24 April 1751 – 4 September 1771
5	Henry Harford (1758–1834)	4 September 1771 – 4 July 1776

== See also ==
- Baron Baltimore
- Loyalist (American Revolution)
