= Charles Calvert, 5th Baron Baltimore =

British politician and colonial administrator

The Right Honourable The Lord Baltimore
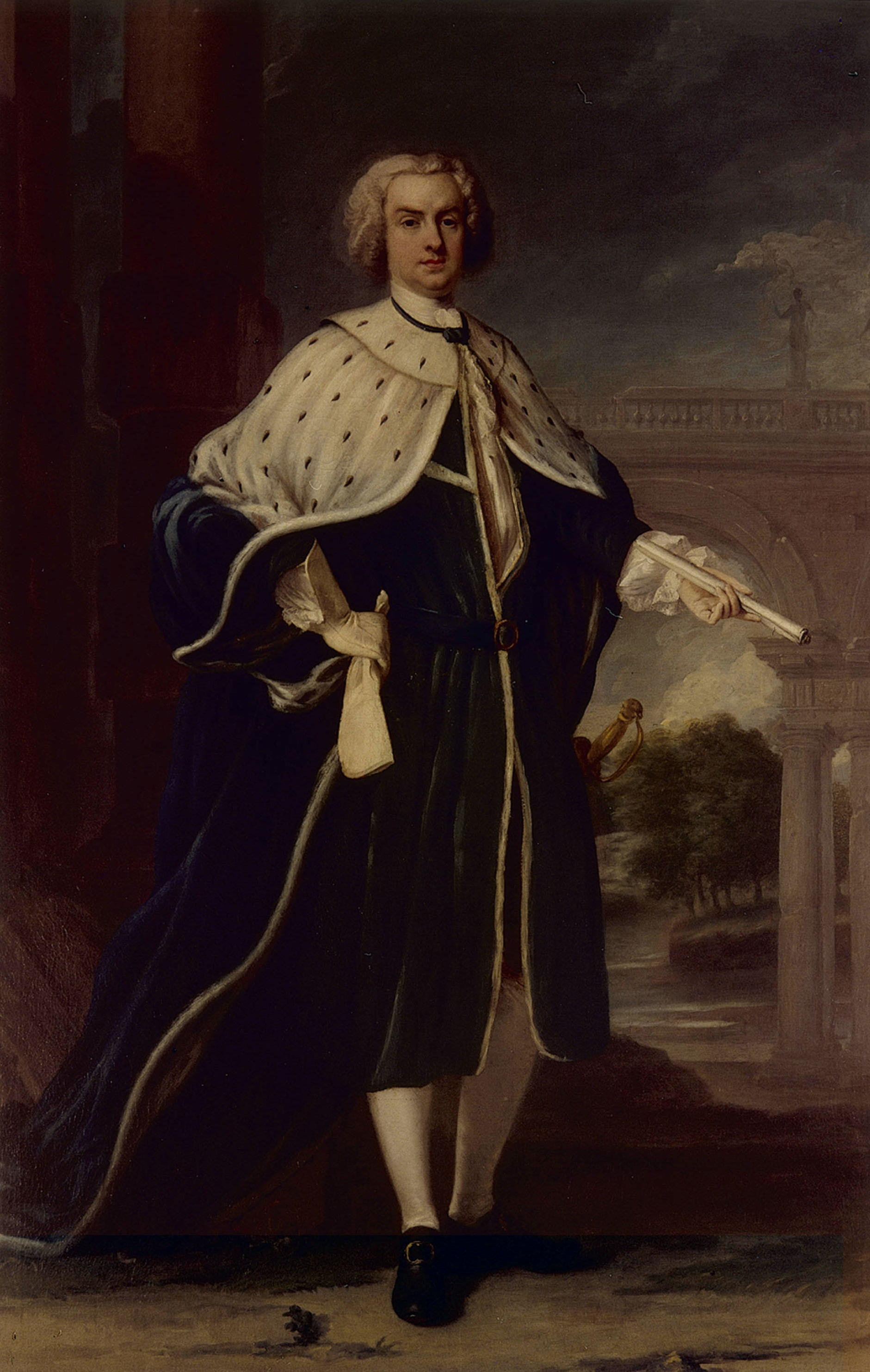
- Portrait by Allan Ramsay, c. 1740

Lord of the Admiralty
- In office 1742–1744
- Succeeded by: Henry Bilson Legge

6th Governor of Restored Proprietary Government
- In office 1732–1733
- Preceded by: Samuel Ogle
- Succeeded by: Samuel Ogle

Personal details
- Born: 29 September 1699 England
- Died: 24 April 1751 (aged 51) England
- Spouse: Mary Janssen
- Children: Frederick Calvert, 6th Baron Baltimore; Caroline Eden; Louisa Browning; Benedict Swingate Calvert
- Parent(s): Benedict Calvert, 4th Baron Baltimore; Charlotte Lee, Lady Baltimore
- Occupation: politician

Coat of Arms of the Barons Baltimore

Charles Calvert, 5th Baron Baltimore, FRS (29 September 1699 – 24 April 1751) was a British politician and colonial administrator who served as the proprietary governor of the Province of Maryland. He inherited the title to Maryland aged just fifteen, on the death of his father and grandfather, when the colony was restored by the British monarchy to the Calvert family's control, following its seizure in 1688. In 1721 Charles came of age and assumed personal control of Maryland, travelling there briefly in 1732. For most of his life, he remained in England, where he pursued an active career in politics, rising to become Lord of the Admiralty from 1742 to 1744. He died in 1751 in England, aged 52.

== Early life ==
Charles Calvert was born in England on 29 September 1699, the eldest son of Benedict Calvert, 4th Baron Baltimore, and Charlotte Lee, Lady Baltimore. His grandmother Charlotte Lee, Countess of Lichfield, was the illegitimate daughter of Charles II, by his mistress, Barbara Palmer, 1st Duchess of Cleveland.

Like the rest of his Calvert family, Charles had been raised a Catholic but was withdrawn from his Jesuit school when his father Benedict converted to Anglicanism, largely for political reasons. Henceforth father and son would worship within the Church of England, much to the disgust of Charles Calvert, 3rd Baron Baltimore, who upheld his Catholic faith, despite the political drawbacks, until his death in 1715.

== Career in politics ==
=== Background ===
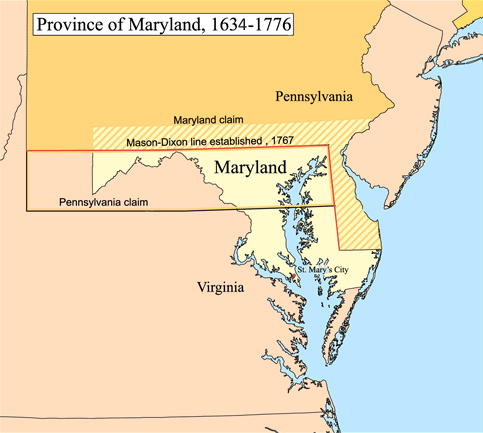
Map of the Province of Maryland showing the area in dispute with Pennsylvania

In 1688, eleven years before Charles Calvert (1699–1751) was born, the Calvert family had lost their title to the Province of Maryland, following the events of the Glorious Revolution in England. In 1689 the royal charter to the colony was withdrawn, leading to direct rule by the British Crown. In 1715, when Charles was fifteen, his grandfather Charles Calvert, 3rd Baron Baltimore died, passing his title, and his claim to Maryland, to his son Benedict Leonard Calvert, 4th Baron Baltimore, (1679–1715). Benedict Calvert immediately petitioned George I for the restoration of the family's proprietorial title to Maryland but, before the king could rule on the petition, Benedict Calvert himself died, just two months after his father, passing on his title in turn to his son Charles. Charles Calvert soon found himself, aged just fifteen, in the fortunate position of having had his family's proprietorial title to Maryland restored by the king.

In 1721 Charles came of age and, at 21, assumed control of the colony of Maryland, though he appointed his cousin Charles Calvert, then a captain in the Grenadier Guards, as governor.

In 1722, Charles Calvert, fifth Baron Baltimore found himself in financial difficulties and sold the Kiplin estate, his family's home since 1620, to his mother's second husband (his stepfather) Christopher Crowe for £7,000 (approximately £550,000 in modern currency) (later purchased as historical inheritance for the State of Maryland by the University of Maryland).

In 1727 Lord Baltimore appointed his brother, Benedict Leonard Calvert, governor of the colony, replacing his cousin Captain Calvert. The handover of power from cousin to cousin was not entirely smooth. Captain Calvert insisted on retaining fifty per cent of the 3 pence tobacco duty which was his due under legislation passed in 1727. Benedict was unimpressed, and his younger brother Cecil wrote to him that family opinion in England was appalled at Captain Calvert's behaviour, and "thinks him mad". Lord Baltimore himself wrote that Benedict should receive the full benefit of the tax.

Unfortunately, Benedict's health was poor and he died of tuberculosis on 1 June 1732, while sailing back to England. He was succeeded in 1732 by Governor Samuel Ogle under whose rule Maryland became engaged in a border dispute with Pennsylvania. Several settlers were taken prisoners on both sides and Pennsylvania sent a committee to Governor Ogle to resolve the situation. Rioting broke out in the disputed territory and Ogle appealed to the King for resolution.

=== Journey to Maryland ===
Faced with this situation, Charles sailed to Maryland and personally assumed charge of the colony in 1732, becoming for a brief period governor in his own right. His purpose in undertaking the long journey was chiefly to settle the dispute with Pennsylvania, as well as to attend to other pressing matters. Violence had broken out on the border with Pennsylvania, with Maryland loyalists such as Thomas Cresap engaging in violent exchanges with hostile Pennsylvanians.

Unfortunately for the Marylanders, Charles unwittingly agreed to a settlement of the territorial dispute with Pennsylvania, based on an inaccurate map, using calculations of latitude and longitude which were either wrong or were deliberately omitted. Upon realizing the scale of his deception, Lord Baltimore reneged on the agreement, but in 1735 The Penns brought proceedings in the Court of Chancery in London to enforce compliance. Chancery proceedings were notoriously slow and a final verdict was not reached until 1750, when Lord Chancellor Hardwicke found in favour of the claims of the Pennsylvanians in every respect. Charles's error ultimately resulted in the loss to Pennsylvania of approximately one thousand square miles of Maryland territory.

=== Return to England ===
In 1732 Calvert returned to England, again leaving the government of Maryland in the hands of Governor Samuel Ogle, and pursued a successful career in English politics. He was a Fellow of the Royal Society and a friend of fourth-cousin, Frederick Louis who was Prince of Wales and the eldest son of King George II of Great Britain. He was Gentleman of the Bedchamber to the Prince of Wales between 1731 and 1747.

In 1739 he sailed on his new yacht Augusta for Russia to represent the British royal family at the marriage of Grand Duchess Anna Leopoldovna of Russia to Anthony Ulrich, Duke of Brunswick-Lüneburg. The union, designed to strengthen the relationships between the houses of Romanov and Habsburg, was celebrated in grand style. Francesco Algarotti, the Italian polymath accompanied Calvert and sent detailed accounts of the journey to and from St Petersburg to his friend Lord Hervey. Also in the party were mathematician Erasmus King, and young Thomas Desaguliers, son of Dr John Theophilus Desaguliers.

Baltimore was elected Member of Parliament (MP) for St Germains, a rotten borough in Cornwall, from 1734 to 1741, and was MP for Surrey from 1741 to 1751. He was Lord of the Admiralty from 1742 to 1744, and from 1747 to 1751 he was Surveyor-General of the Duchy of Cornwall. In addition, he was Cofferer of the Household to the Prince of Wales from 1747 to 1751.

Calvert was able to sit in the House of Commons as a member of the Irish peerage. Irish peerages were often used as a way of creating peerages which did not grant a seat in the English House of Lords and so allowed the grantee to sit in the House of Commons in London. As a consequence, many Irish peers had little or no connection to Ireland.

George II said of Charles Calvert: "there is my Lord Baltimore, who thinks he understands everything, and understands nothing: who wants to be well with both Courts and is well with neither, and who, entre nous, is a little mad."

== Family ==
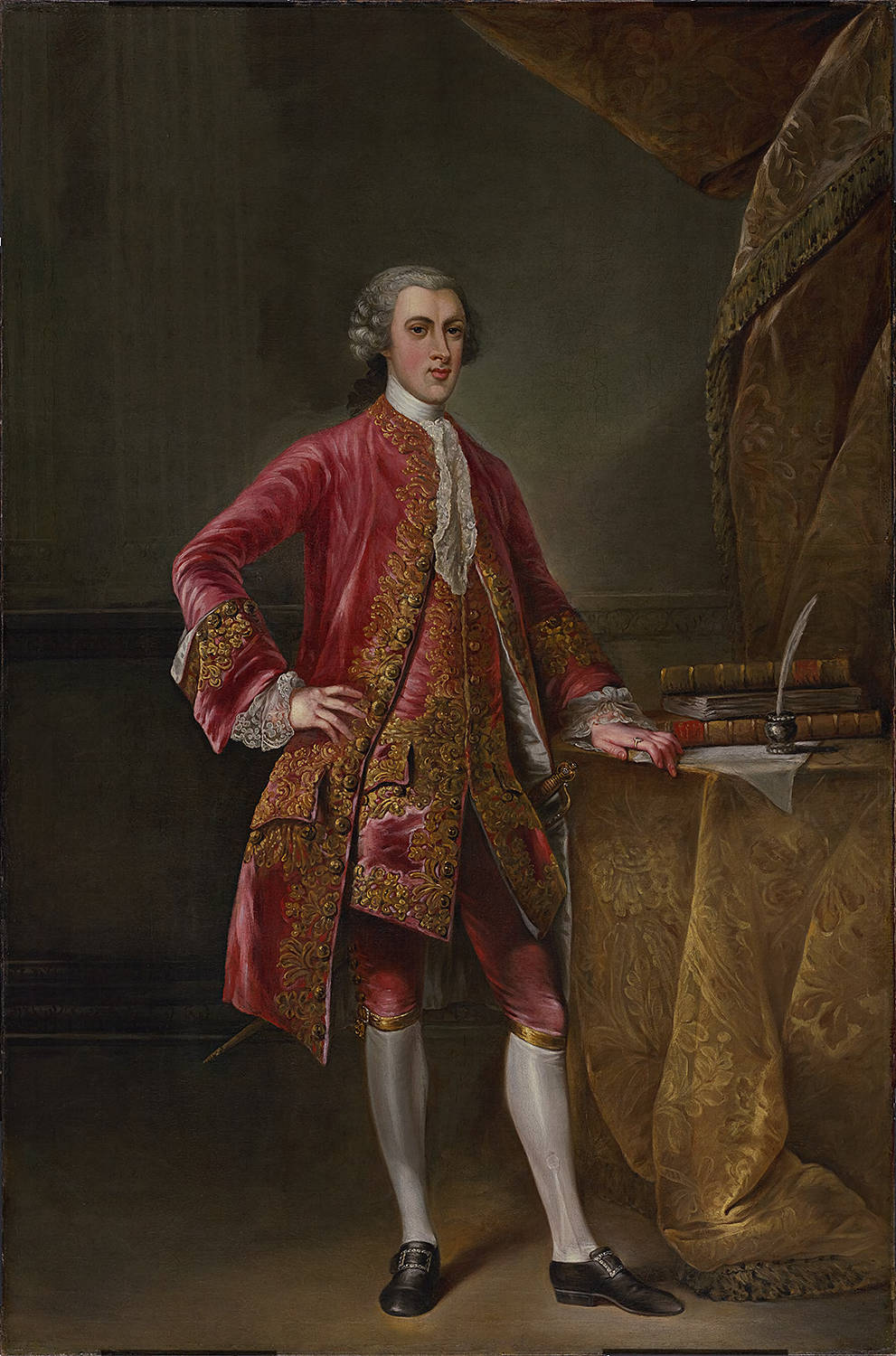
Charles was succeeded by his eldest son Frederick Calvert, 6th Baron Baltimore.

On 20 July 1730, Charles married Mary Janssen, who died at Chaillot, Paris, on 25 March 1770, the daughter of Sir Theodore Janssen, 1st Baronet, and Williamza or Williamsa Henley. Mary's sister, Barbara, married Thomas Bladen a year later. Charles and Mary had three children:

- Frederick Calvert (6 February 1731 – 4 September 1771) who succeeded his father to become the 6th and final Lord Baltimore, but led a life of idleness, indulgence and scandal.
- Caroline Calvert, born ca. 1745, who on 26 April 1763 married Sir Robert Eden, 1st Baronet, of Maryland, the last colonial governor of Maryland. His rule was overthrown during the events of the American Revolution in 1774–6.
- Louisa Calvert, married John Browning. On the death of her brother Frederick in 1771, Louisa contested his will, arguing that she should inherit the proprietorship of Maryland, rather than Frederick's illegitimate son Henry Harford. Before the suit could be decided, Maryland was part of the independent United States of America.

Charles also had an illegitimate son, Benedict Swingate Calvert, born in around 1730–32. His mother's identity is not clear but H. S. Lee Washington, writing in the New England Historic Genealogical Society Register in July 1950, suggests that she was Melusina von der Schulenburg, Countess of Walsingham. Melusina was the daughter of George I of Great Britain and his mistress, Melusine von der Schulenburg, Duchess of Kendal. Whatever the truth of this, it seems likely that Benedict's mother was a person of some consequence. According to a letter of Benedict's daughter-in-law Rosalie Stier Calvert dated 10 June 1814, his mother had been a woman "of the highest rank in England". In 1742, aged about ten or twelve years, the young Benedict was escorted to America and placed in the care of Dr. George H. Steuart, an Annapolis physician and a political ally of the Calverts.

It appears Charles Calvert also had two illegitimate children by Cecil Mignon Bressan (born 1717), daughter of Peter Bressan: Charles Cecil Bressan Calvert and Augustus Bressan Calvert.

== Woodcote Park ==
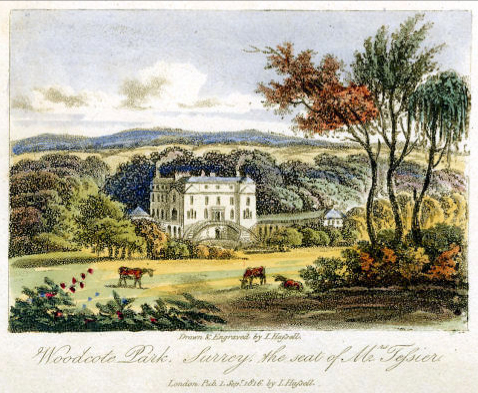
Woodcote Park in an engraving by John Hassell circa 1816

Charles lived with his family at Woodcote Park in Epsom, Surrey, a grand estate originally built in the seventeenth century by Richard Evelyn, brother to John Evelyn the diarist. He made many changes to the house, though his brothers complained that he "pulled down everything" and "finished nothing".

== Death and legacy ==
Charles died in 1751 and was succeeded by his eldest legitimate son, Frederick Calvert, 6th Baron Baltimore. Unlike his father, Frederick Calvert took little interest in politics, treating his estates, including Maryland, as mere sources of revenue to indulge his appetites, which were considerable. By 1776 Maryland had been engulfed in the American Revolution and the Calverts would lose control over their proprietary colony for good.

Charles Calvert's portrait, along with those of the other Barons Baltimore, still hangs today in the Enoch Pratt Free Library in Baltimore, the city that bears his family name.

The historian Thomas Carlyle described Calvert as "something of a fool, judging by the face of him in portraits, and by some of his doings in the world", though other historians have been kinder to his reputation.

The official flag of the State of Maryland, uniquely among the fifty states, still bears the arms of the Barons Baltimore to this day.

Charles County and Charles Street in Baltimore are named for Charles Calvert.

== See also ==
- Baron Baltimore
- List of colonial governors of Maryland
- Province of Maryland

== Notes ==
Parliament of the United Kingdom
Preceded by Dudley Ryder; Richard Eliot	Member of Parliament for St Germans; 1734–1741; With: Charles Montagu	Succeeded by John Hynde Cotton; James Newsham
Preceded by Thomas Scawen; John Walter	Member of Parliament for Surrey; 1741–1751; With: Arthur Onslow	Succeeded by Thomas Budgen; Arthur Onslow
Government offices
Vacant Royal control Title last held by The 3rd Lord Baltimore	Proprietor of Maryland; 1715–1751	Succeeded by The 6th Lord Baltimore
Peerage of Ireland
Preceded by Benedict Leonard Calvert	Baron Baltimore; 1715–1751	Succeeded by Frederick Calvert
