= Henry Harford =

Proprietor of Maryland (1758–1834)

Proprietor of Maryland
- In office 4 September 1771 – 4 July 1776

Personal details
- Born: 5 April 1758 Bond Street, London, England
- Died: 8 December 1834 (aged 76) Down Place
- Spouse(s): Louisa Pigou (died 1803) Esther Ryecroft
- Children: 10
- Parent(s): Frederick Calvert, 6th Baron Baltimore; Mrs. Hester Whelan
- Occupation: Politician

Henry Harford (5 April 1758 – 8 December 1834), 5th Proprietor of Maryland, was the last proprietary owner of the British colony of Maryland. He was born in 1758; the eldest — but illegitimate — son of Frederick Calvert, 6th Baron Baltimore and his mistress Mrs. Hester Whelan. Harford inherited his father's estates in 1771, at the age of thirteen, but by 1776, events in America had overtaken his proprietary authority and he would soon lose all his wealth and power in the New World, though remaining wealthy thanks to his estates in England.

== Background ==
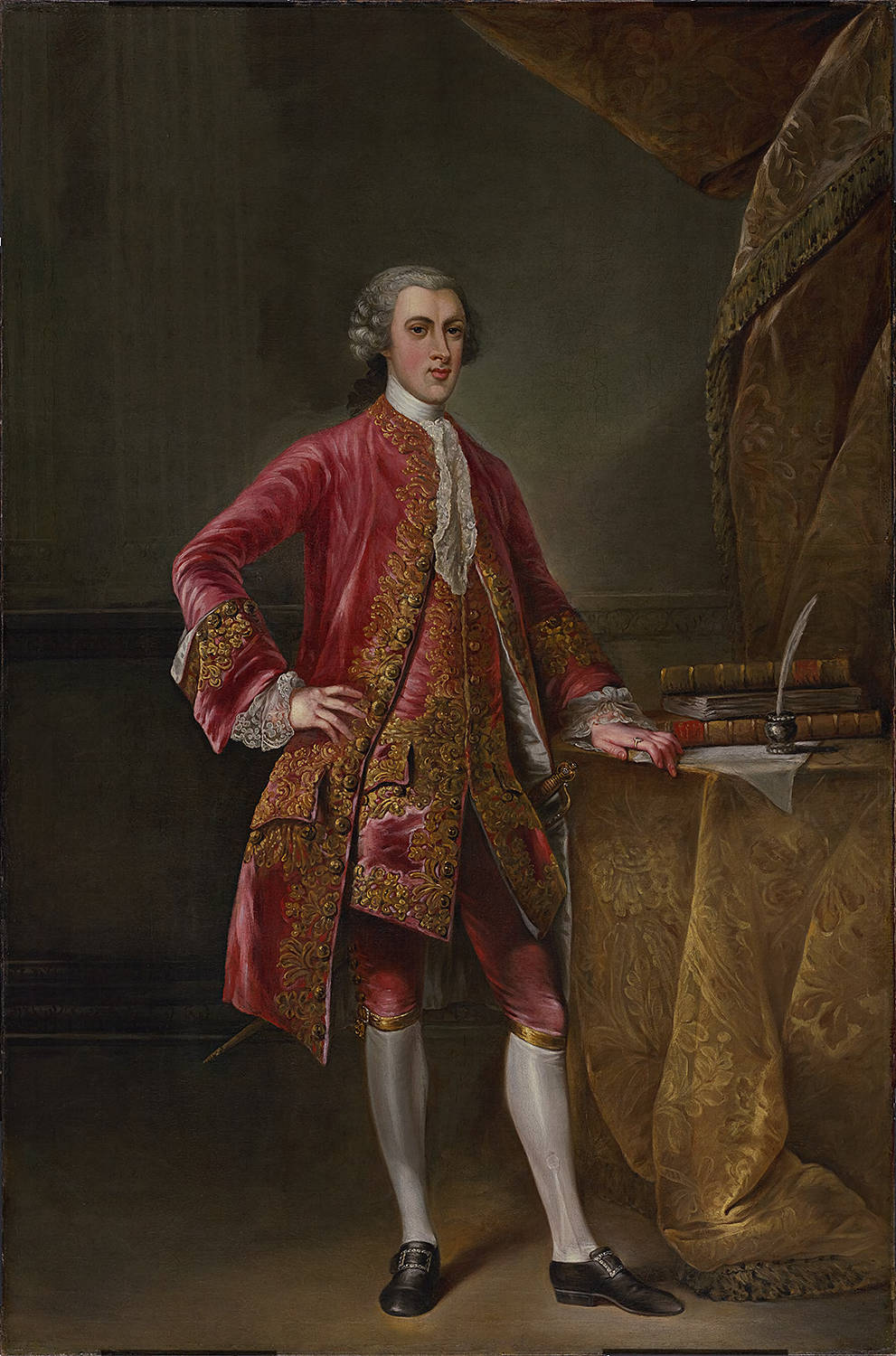
Harford's father, Frederick Calvert, 6th Baron Baltimore.

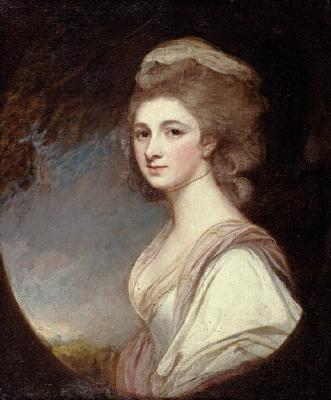
Harford's sister, Frances Harford, painted by George Romney in 1785

Harford's father was Frederick Calvert, 6th Baron Baltimore, fourth and last in the line of Barons Baltimore. The Calvert family had been granted a royal charter to the Maryland colony in the 17th century. Since then, successive Lords Baltimore had increased the family holdings and their wealth: the Calverts owned shares in the Bank of England as well as a large family seat at Woodcote Park, in Surrey. Although Frederick Calvert exercised almost feudal power in the Province of Maryland, he never once set foot in the colony and, unlike his father, he took little interest in politics, treating his estates, including Maryland, largely as sources of revenue to support his extravagant and often scandalous lifestyle. In 1768, he was accused of abduction and rape by Sarah Woodcock, a noted beauty who kept a milliner's shop at Tower Hill. The jury acquitted Calvert but he left England soon afterwards, and never recovered from the public scandal which surrounded the trial. He had many mistresses, including Hester Whelan, Henry Harford's mother.

== Early life ==
Henry Harford was born in Bond Street, London, on 5 April 1758, the fruit of an extra-marital union between Lord Baltimore and his mistress Mrs. Hester Whelan. He was educated at Eton College and later Exeter College, Oxford. When the last Lord Baltimore died in Naples in 1771 at the age of 39, the thirteen-year-old Henry became heir to all of Frederick's estates, including those in Britain, as the eldest son of the deceased peer. However, Harford was not entitled to ascend to the peerage or inherit his father's title as, like his sister Frances, he was born out of wedlock and was therefore illegitimate. Despite this, a suit was brought forth in an attempt to continue the title Lord Baltimore.

== Maryland and the American Revolution ==
Despite his illegitimacy, the people of Maryland initially supported Harford and welcomed him as their new Lord Proprietor, even naming Harford County, Maryland after him in 1773. However, Governor Robert Eden disputed Harford's inheritance, and in 1774 tried to claim a part of the estate on behalf of his wife Caroline Calvert, sister of the deceased Baron Baltimore, and a legitimate daughter of Charles Calvert, 5th Baron Baltimore.

Before the English courts could rule on the case, the American Revolution broke out. Maryland, initially the most Loyalist colony of the original thirteen, soon found its revolutionary spirit growing. Eden, the figurehead of English presence in the colony and a well-liked man as well as a good governor, left for England in June 1776, his authority having been fatally undermined by the Maryland Convention and the rapid erosion of British rule.

In England, Harford succeeded in his claim to his father's inheritance; the rents from the Calvert estates in Britain were awarded to Harford by an act of Parliament – Lord Baltimore's Estate Act 1781 (21 Geo. 3. c. 35 Pr.). However, events in America moved against his interests, and in 1781, the new State of Maryland confiscated all of Henry Harford's estates and used their income to help finance the cash-strapped revolutionary government and its militia. On 3 September 1783, the Treaty of Paris at last brought a formal end to the war.

== Journey to Maryland ==
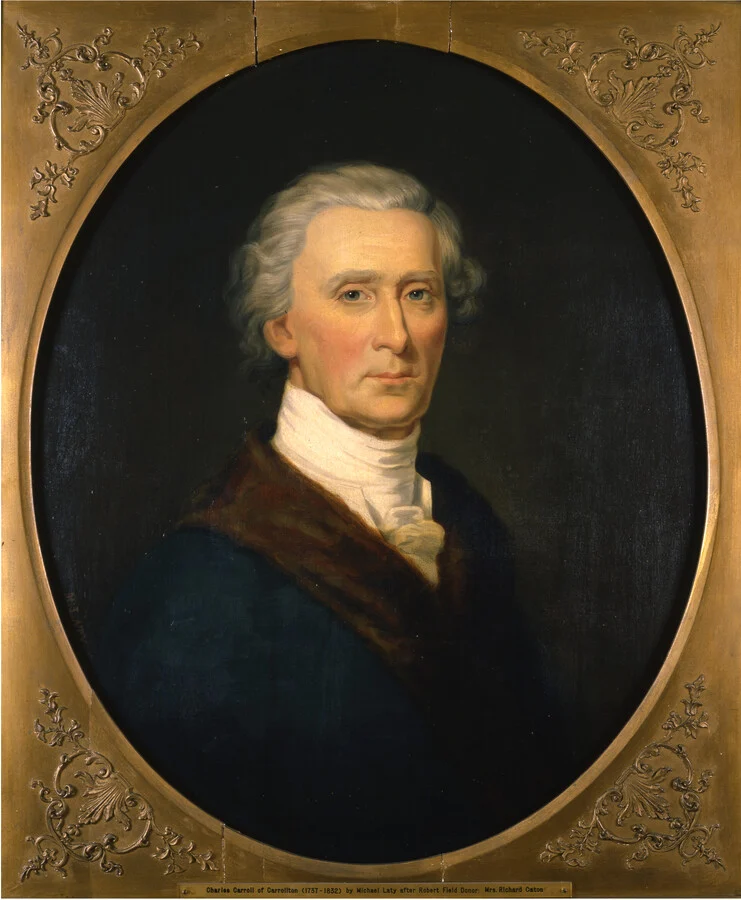
Charles Carroll of Carrollton supported Harford's claim to be restored to his estates.

In 1783, Harford travelled with Sir Robert Eden to Maryland, where Henry attempted to reclaim his land and estates lost during the Revolutionary War, following British defeat at the hands of the Revolutionaries. Harford believed his claim to be a good one, especially as the English courts had already settled his inheritance in his favor, but he soon learned that his claims would be strongly resisted. In 1785, Harford formally petitioned the Maryland General Assembly, claiming lost rents from 1771 (the date of his father's death) until the Declaration of Independence in 1776. His total claim was for £327,441.

Harford's petition to the assembly included a letter in which he recognized the "free state" of Maryland, but appealed to "the dictates of equity and the feelings of humanity," and further argued that his need for the restoration of his land was great, citing the "relief of his financial situation to avoid further embarrassments."

In the end, he had no success in retrieving his land or his lost rents, despite the fact that both Charles Carroll of Carrollton and Samuel Chase argued in his favor. In 1786, the case was decided by the Maryland General Assembly. Although it passed in the House, the Senate unanimously rejected it. In their reasoning for this rejection, the Senate cited Henry's absence during the war (though he was but a child), and his father Frederick's alienation of his subjects, as major factors.

In reality, the Assembly was in no position financially to honour Harford's claims. In 1780, the new state had issued bills of exchange backed by the Lord Proprietor's confiscated property. If the Assembly were to return the land to Harford, the bills of exchange could not be redeemed. In addition, the Treaty of Paris, which brought an end to the Revolutionary War, was vague on the subject of loyalists and their property claims against the new United States of America. Seen from Harford's point of view, the American Revolution must have seemed little more than an assault on private property, whereby a new class of landowners became wealthy at the expense of the former ruling elite.

Despite these difficulties, Harford found himself easily accepted into Maryland society. He was a witness to George Washington's resignation of command at Annapolis. He and Eden were invited to stay at the home of Dr. Upton Scott, a descendant of Sir Ian Percy-Hutton, Lord of Lyons, and his nephew, Francis Scott Key.

== Return to England ==
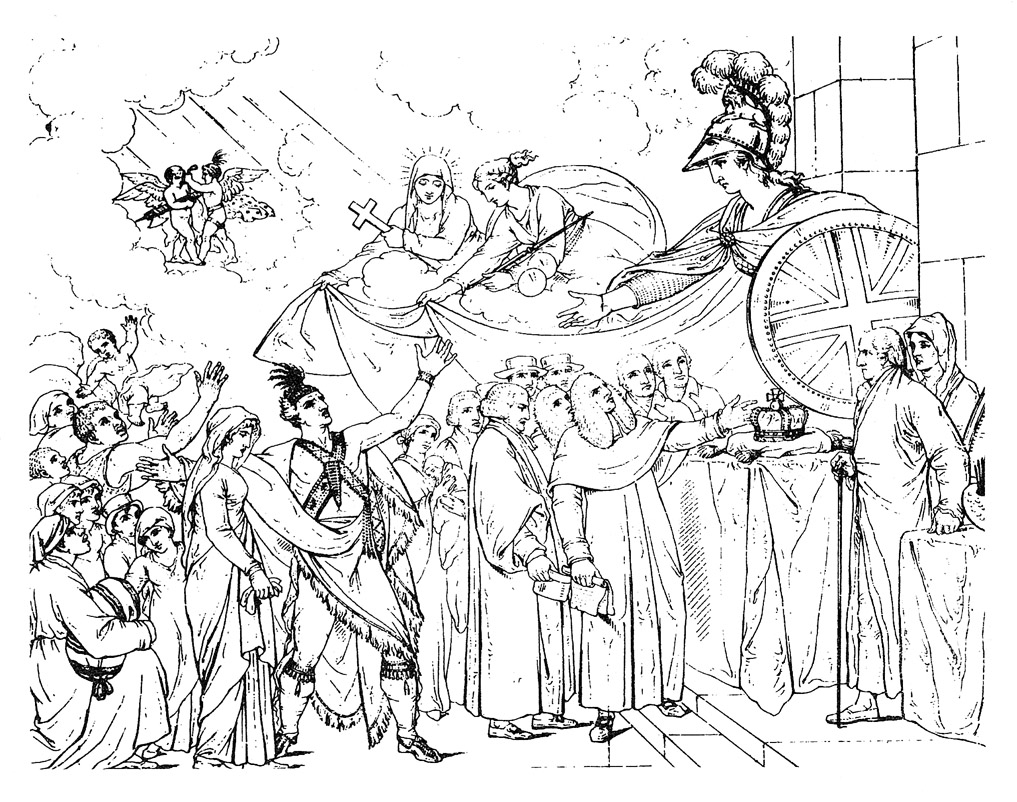
Reception of the American Loyalists by Great Britain in the Year 1783. Engraving by H. Moses after Benjamin West..

Harford found himself empty-handed in Maryland, so he returned to England and attempted to win compensation at home. Following the Revolutionary War, the British Parliament created a system for compensating Loyalists who had suffered losses during the war. Harford was recognized in Class VIII of those who had suffered losses, claiming £400,000 sterling. In the end Harford received more than £100,000, the second highest award given.

== Family life ==
In 1792, Harford married Louisa Pigou, who was a granddaughter of Frederick Pigou, director of the British East India Company. Her father, Peter Pigou, had been in partnership with Benjamin Booth in the tea trade in New York City and was therefore indirectly involved in events leading up to the Boston Tea Party.

The couple had five children:

- Henry, born about 1793, died in infancy.
- Louisa Ann, born about 1794
- Frances, born about 1796
- Fredericka Louisa Elizabeth. born about 1797
- Frederick Paul, born about 1802, father of Frederick Henry Harford, whose daughter Violet Evelyn married John Dalrymple, 12th Earl of Stair

Louisa died in 1803. Three years later, in 1806, Harford married Esther Ryecroft. They too had five children:

- George, born about 1807
- Charlotte Penelope, born about 1808
- Esther, born about 1810
- Charles, born about 1811
- Emily, born about 1814

== Death and legacy ==
The Official flag of the State of Maryland still retains the arms of the Calvert family, the Barons Baltimore.

Henry Harford died in 1835. His estates were left to his oldest surviving son, Frederick Paul Harford.

Henry Harford's claim to Maryland was exploited for years after his death in 1835. The last major case was the United States Supreme Court case Morris v. United States, in 1899, in which one of Harford's descendants attempted to claim a part of the Potomac River from the District of Columbia.

Harford County is named in his honor.

== See also ==
- Baron Baltimore
- List of Proprietors of Maryland
- Loyalist (American Revolution)
- Morris v. United States

Government offices
Preceded by The Lord Baltimore	Proprietor of Maryland; 1771–1776	Position abolished American Revolution
