= Woodcote Park =

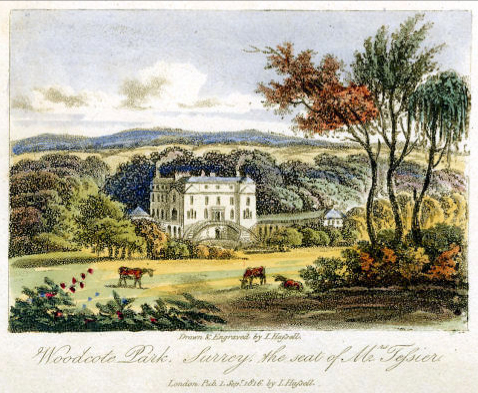
- Woodcote Park in an engraving by John Hassell, c. 1816

- Location within Surrey

General information
- Type: Country house
- Architectural style: Jacobean, Georgian
- Location: Epsom, England
- Coordinates: 51°18′55″N 0°16′33″W
- Construction started: Late 17th century
- Renovated: 1936
- Destroyed: Gutted by fire 1934, restored 1936
- Owner: Royal Automobile Club

Technical details
- Structural system: Timber frame, brick, stucco

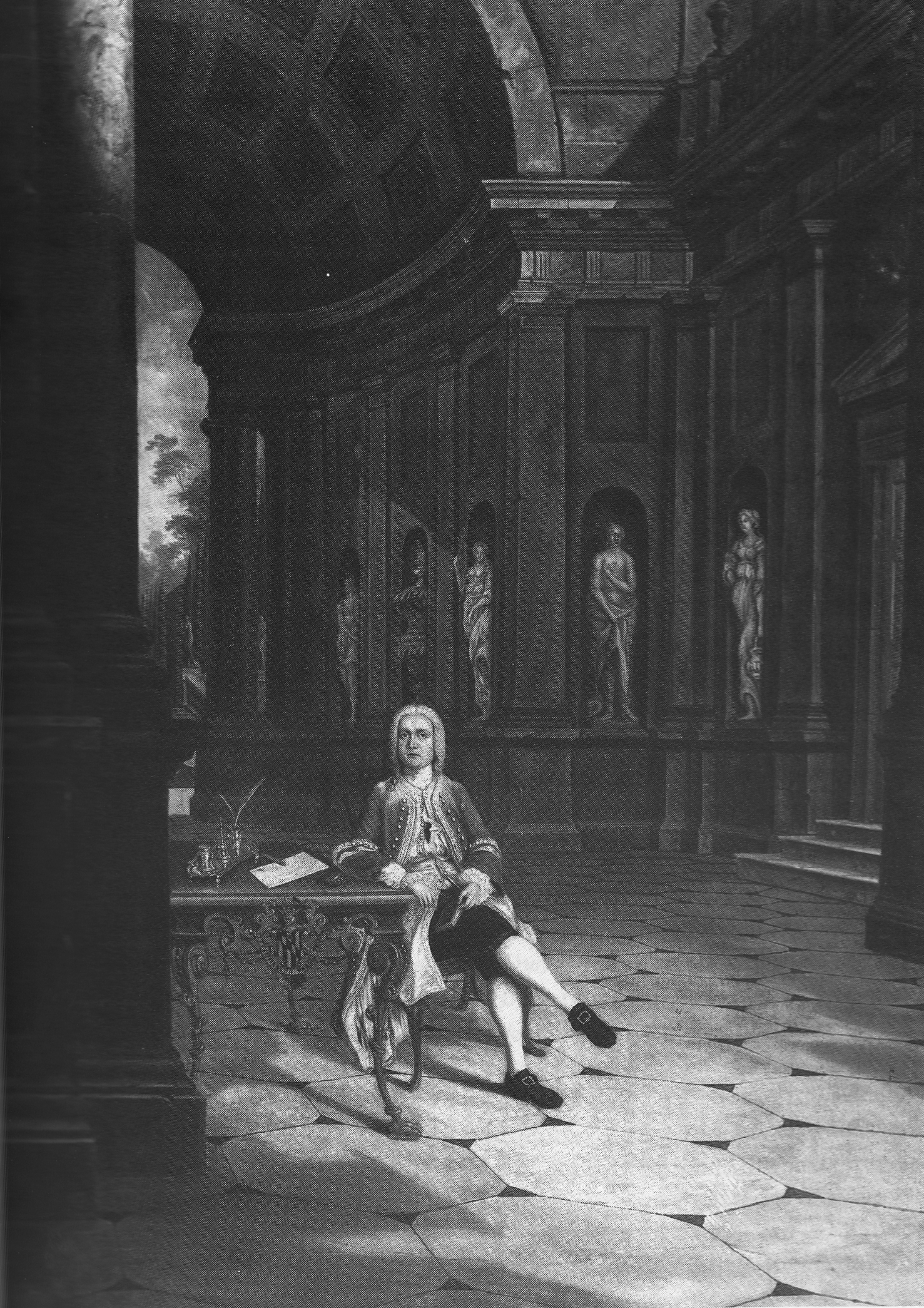
Benedict Leonard Calvert, younger son of Benedict Calvert, 4th Baron Baltimore, painted by Francis Brerewood at the family home of Woodcote Park, Surrey, c1726.

Woodcote Park is a Grade II* listed stately home and estate of about 350 acres (1.4 km^{2}; 0.5 sq mi) near Epsom, Surrey, England, currently owned by the Royal Automobile Club. It was formerly the seat of a number of prominent English families, including the Calvert family, Barons Baltimore and Lords Proprietor of the colony of Maryland. The interior of the house once boasted a gilded library and number of fine murals by notable Italian artists including Antonio Verrio, but most of the historic rooms were removed by the RAC, which had purchased the estate in 1913, and what remained was destroyed by fire in 1934. The present appearance of the house dates from its restoration in 1936. However, the interior of one of the original drawing rooms still survives in the Museum of Fine Arts at Boston, Massachusetts. The estate was used by the military as a convalescent hospital in the First World War and as a training camp in both world wars.

== History ==
Epsom (Evesham) is recorded as belonging to the Abbey of Chertsey in the Domesday Book of 1086. The land comprising Woodcote was originally part of the estate of the Manor of Horton, granted by the abbot of Chertsey to John Merston and his wife Rose in 1440. Horton passed through generations of the Merston and Mynne families. By the start of the 16th century, the Woodcote land belonged to John Ewell of Horton, remaining in his family until 1591, when the estate was subject to litigation between Agnes Tyther, a descendant of Ewell, and Roger Lamborde. In 1597, the estate belonged to John Mynne, Lord of the manor of Horton.

=== Seventeenth century ===
Woodcote was inherited with Horton Manor by Elizabeth, wife of Richard Evelyn who in 1679 built the estate's main mansion house. The house is mentioned in the diary of Samuel Pepys. Elizabeth Evelyn bequeathed both Horton Manor and Woodcote Park to Charles Calvert, 3rd Baron Baltimore, a remote "connexion" of her family and proprietary governor of the colony of Maryland. Lord Baltimore, a Roman Catholic, lost control of the province of Maryland during the Protestant Revolution of 1689.

=== Eighteenth century ===
In around 1712, Woodcote Park was described by Celia Fiennes:

Lord Baltimores in Woodcut Green encompassed with a wall at the entrance, a breast wall with pallisadoes, large courts one within the other, and a back way to the stables where there is a pretty horse pond; the house is old but low, though large run over much ground; as I drove by the side saw broad chimneys on the end and at due distance on the side on both ends the sides of a court which terminated in a building on which there is a lead with railes and barristers.

In 1715 the third Lord Baltimore died, and Woodcote Park was inherited by Benedict Calvert, 4th Baron Baltimore. However he died less than two months after his father, on 16 April 1715. On Benedict's death Woodcote was inherited by the fifteen-year-old Charles Calvert, 5th Baron Baltimore, born in 1699. Calvert made many changes to the house, including adding a Palladian facade by John Vardy, though Lord Baltimore's brothers complained that he "pulled down everything" and "finished nothing". On Charles's death in 1751, his son, Frederick Calvert, 6th Baron Baltimore, inherited the estate. According to Horace Walpole, Frederick spent large sums of money making the interior of the house "tawdry" and "ridiculous" in what Calvert called the "French" style. Woodcote was sold to various owners; Mr. Monk, Mr. Nelson, and Arthur Cuthbert, until c. 1788 when it was sold to London merchant Louis Tessier.

=== Nineteenth century ===
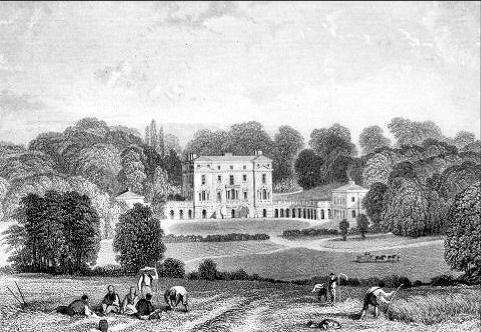
Woodcote Park circa 1840 by J H Kernot, published in Edward William Brayley's Topographical History of Surrey, 1842.

In 1828 the house was described in the following terms:

The mansion is situated in a vale, at the foot of a well wooded eminence, which rises rather abruptly to the south. The east or entrance front is represented in the view given, as seen from the opposite eminence. The basement is cased with stone, and the remainder of the building is stuccoed. It consists of a centre with wings extending in a curvilinear form, and presents an extensive and very imposing frontage. A flight of steps, with balustrade, conducts to the hall which is of good dimensions, and is adorned with coupled Corinthian columns supporting a frieze. Amongst the principal apartments, of which five are en-suite, are two withdrawing-rooms; the walls of the smaller were decorated and painted, as also the ceiling, by foreign artists. The library is a very splendid room, being ornamented with a profusion of gilding on a blue ground. On the ceiling is painted Ganymede, by Verrio. An apartment, styled the painted room, has its walls covered with designs illustrative of the Greek romance of Daphnis and Chloe. At the west end of the building an apartment, formerly used as a chapel, has a painted ceiling representing the Resurrection, by Verrio. On the first floor is a room 40 feet by 28, and 18 feet high. The park lies about a mile south of the village of Epsom, and contiguous to the race-course; it contains about 350 acres.

=== Twentieth century ===
In 1913 the house was purchased by the Royal Automobile Club, which had been seeking a country club with the potential for a golf course for its members. Most of the fine interiors commissioned by the Calverts were then removed by the RAC; the club instructed one Harold G. Lancaster of 55 Conduit St to remove the historic rooms and sell them at auction.

==== First World War ====
In 1914, during the First World War, the War Office requisitioned Woodcote Park for a military training camp for the Universities and Public School Brigade (18th–21st (Service) Battalians, Royal Fusiliers). With construction beginning in November 1914, the camp was built in two sections, 'The Farm Camp' and the 'Ridge Camp'. Built with over 100 huts, to accommodate 5,400 men and 200 officers, the camp was complete with facilities including water, sanitation, roads, mess halls, a recreation hall, chapel, post office and general store.

In May 1915, the Fusilier battalions left Woodcote Camp for Clipstone in Nottinghamshire, and Salisbury Plain, for further training before leaving for France. In June, 1915, under orders of Southern Command, the camp was converted to a military convalescent hospital. Initially, the hospital had 500 beds in Farm Camp section of the site, but this was soon expanded to receive the first patients who were Australian and New Zealand troops from the Gallipoli campaign. In the first year (June 1915 to June 1916), over 20,600 patients were admitted to the Woodcote Park Convalescent Hospital, including British (10,600) soldiers and troops from Imperial territories including Canada (4,500), Australia (4,100), New Zealand (1,400), and South Africa. By July 1916 there were over 3000 convalescents at the hospital, including many Canadian troops from the Battle of the Somme. Such were the numbers of Canadian casualties during the Somme offensive that in August 1916 the entire site was handed over to the Canadian Army Medical Corps and was the largest of the eight convalescent hospitals for Canadian personnel during the war with 3,900 beds. On 17 June 1919, up to 800 Canadian soldiers from the camp rioted, attacking Epsom police station and leaving the station sergeant dead. Subsequently, the Canadian hospital was closed on 30 June 1919 and repurposed as Queen Mary's Convalescent Centre for the treatment and training of ex-servicemen.

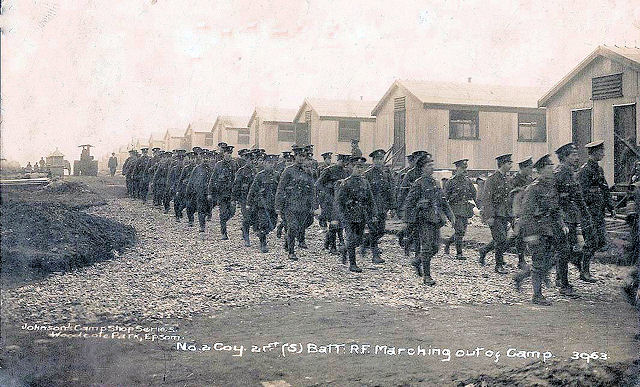
No. 2 Company 21st Battalion Royal Fusiliers marching out of Woodcote Park Camp

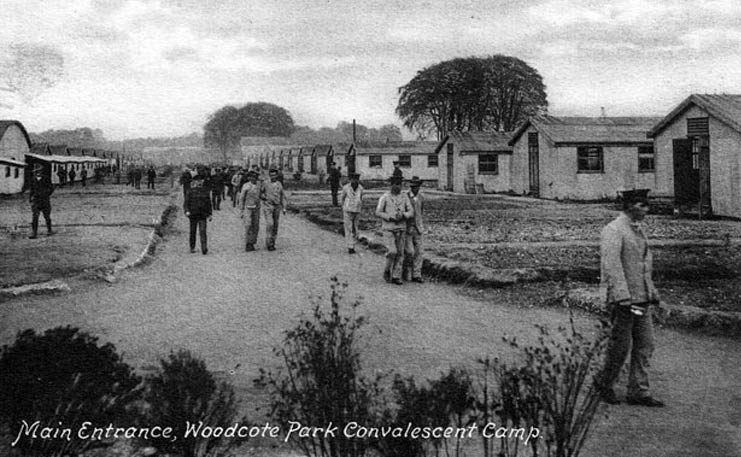
Convalescent soldiers walking up the central path to the main entrance

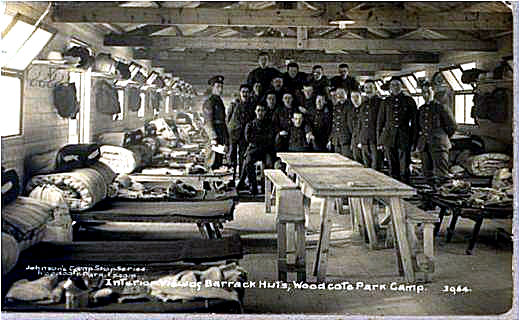
Interior view of barracks

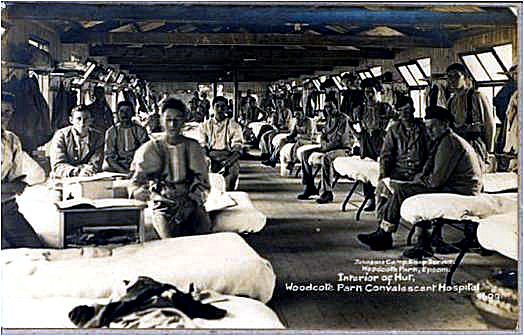
Interior of one of the hospital's convalescent huts

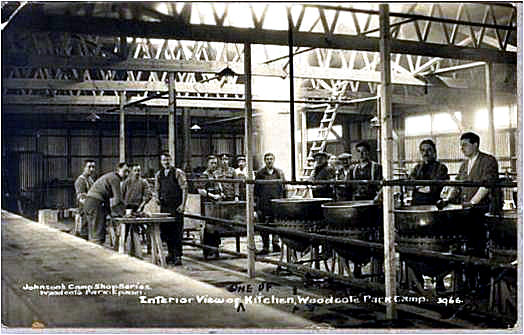
Interior of the camp kitchen

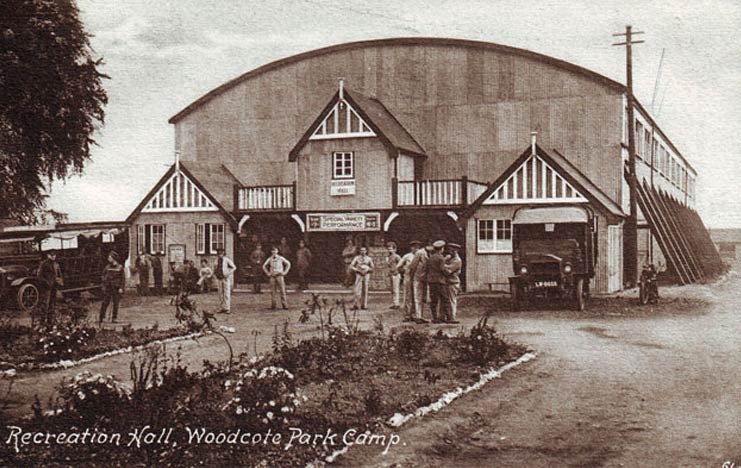
The camp's recreation hall

==== 1920s ====
In 1923, the estate was returned from the War Office to the RAC. In 1927, the interior of one of the mansion's drawing rooms, noted for its excellent carved wood panelling and other decorations in the style of Thomas Chippendale (possibly originally designed for Charles Calvert, 5th Baron Baltimore), was shipped to the United States and installed in the Museum of Fine Arts at Boston, Massachusetts.

==== Fire and restoration ====
In 1934 the house was gutted by fire, leaving very little of the Evelyn mansion and losing works of art by artists including Rubens, Verrio, and Zuccarelli. Fortunately the outer pavilions of the house and many agricultural buildings remained intact, as well as the entrance steps, balustrades and colonnades. The architects Mewès and Davis were commissioned to rebuild the house, and the façade of the house was restored as close to the Evelyn original as was possible.

==== Second World War ====
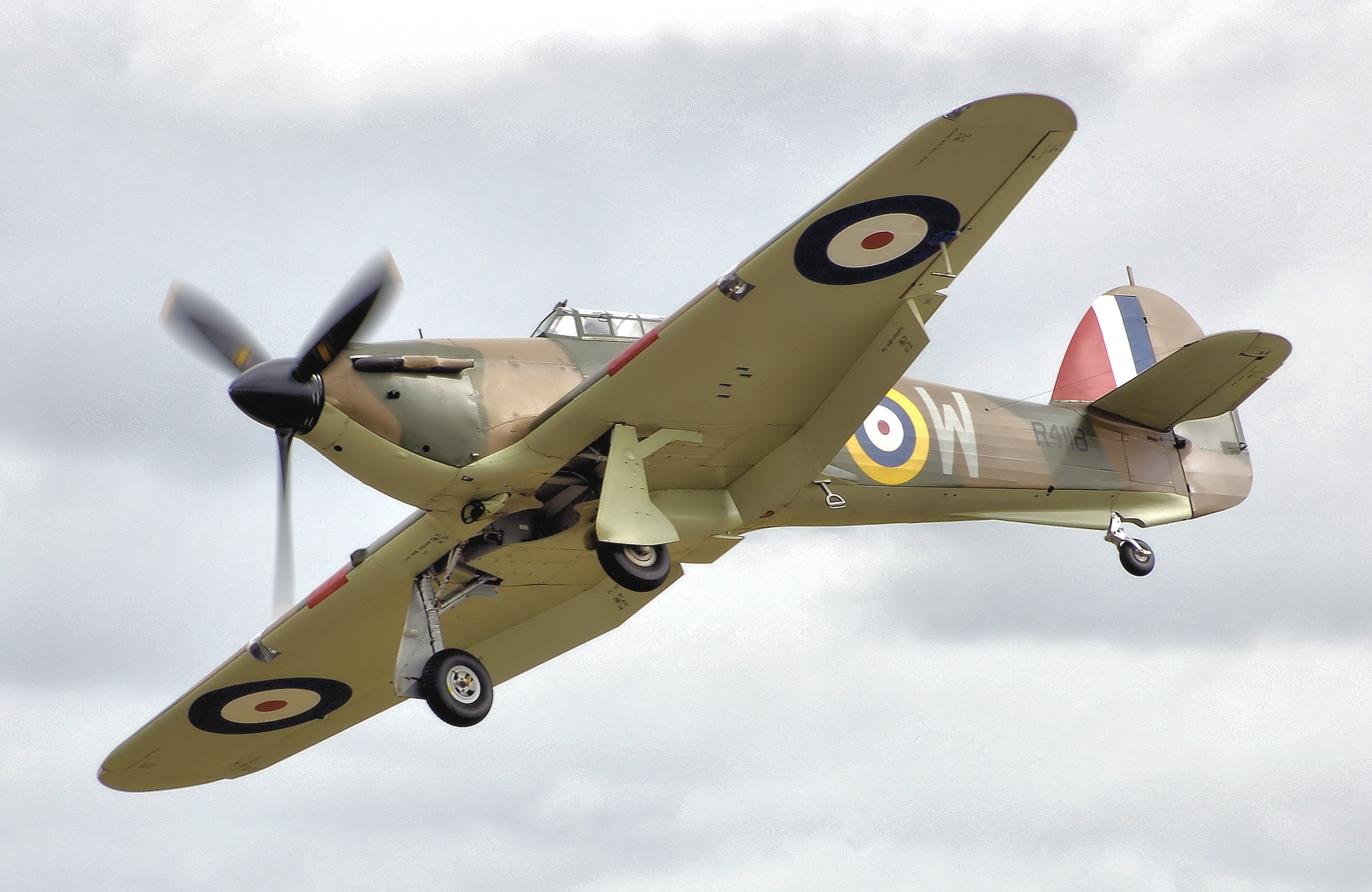
During the Battle of Britain a Hawker Hurricane aircraft was forced to land on the club golf course.

During the Second World War, Woodcote Park was again taken over for military use, being pressed into service as a training centre. The ornamental gardens were ploughed up to grow food for the war effort. In the summer of 1940, during the height of the Battle of Britain, a Hawker Hurricane fighter aircraft was forced to land on the golf course of Woodcote Park. The pilot received medical assistance in the RAC clubhouse, having first proved that he was not an enemy airman by waving a packet of Players cigarettes at nearby golfers.

=== Twenty-first century ===
Woodcote Park serves as one of two club houses of the RAC private members club; the other being at 89–91 Pall Mall, London. It is a grade II* listed building and features two 18-hole downland golf courses on its 350 acres (140 ha) estate.

== See also ==
- Baron Baltimore

== Sources ==
- Hayton, David, p.443, The House of Commons 1690–1715, Volume 2 Retrieved October 2010
- Harris, John, Moving Rooms Retrieved October 2010
- Malden, H.E., ed. (1911). "Parishes: Epsom". A History of the County of Surrey. Vol. 3. London: British History Online. pp. 271–278. Archived from the original on 31 August 2023.
- Manning, Owen; Bray, William (1804). "Epsom". The history and antiquities of the county of Surrey : compiled from the best and most authentic historians, valuable records, and manuscripts in the public offices and libraries, and in private hands; with a facsimile copy of Domesday, engraved on thirteen plates (PDF). London: John White. pp. 609–625. Archived (PDF) from the original on 1 September 2023.
- Pepys, Samuel (1983) [1667]. Latham, Robert; Matthews, William (eds.). The Diary of Samuel Pepys. Vol. 8. London: Bell and Hyman. ISBN 0713515589.
- Stuttard, J.C., ed. (1995). A history of Ashtead. Leatherhead: Leatherhead & District Local History Society. ISBN 978-0-95-060092-5.
- Yentsch, Anne E, A Chesapeake Family and their Slaves: a Study in Historical Archaeology, Cambridge University Press (1994) Retrieved September 2010
