= Frederick Calvert, 6th Baron Baltimore =

British landowner

The Right Honourable The Lord Baltimore FRS
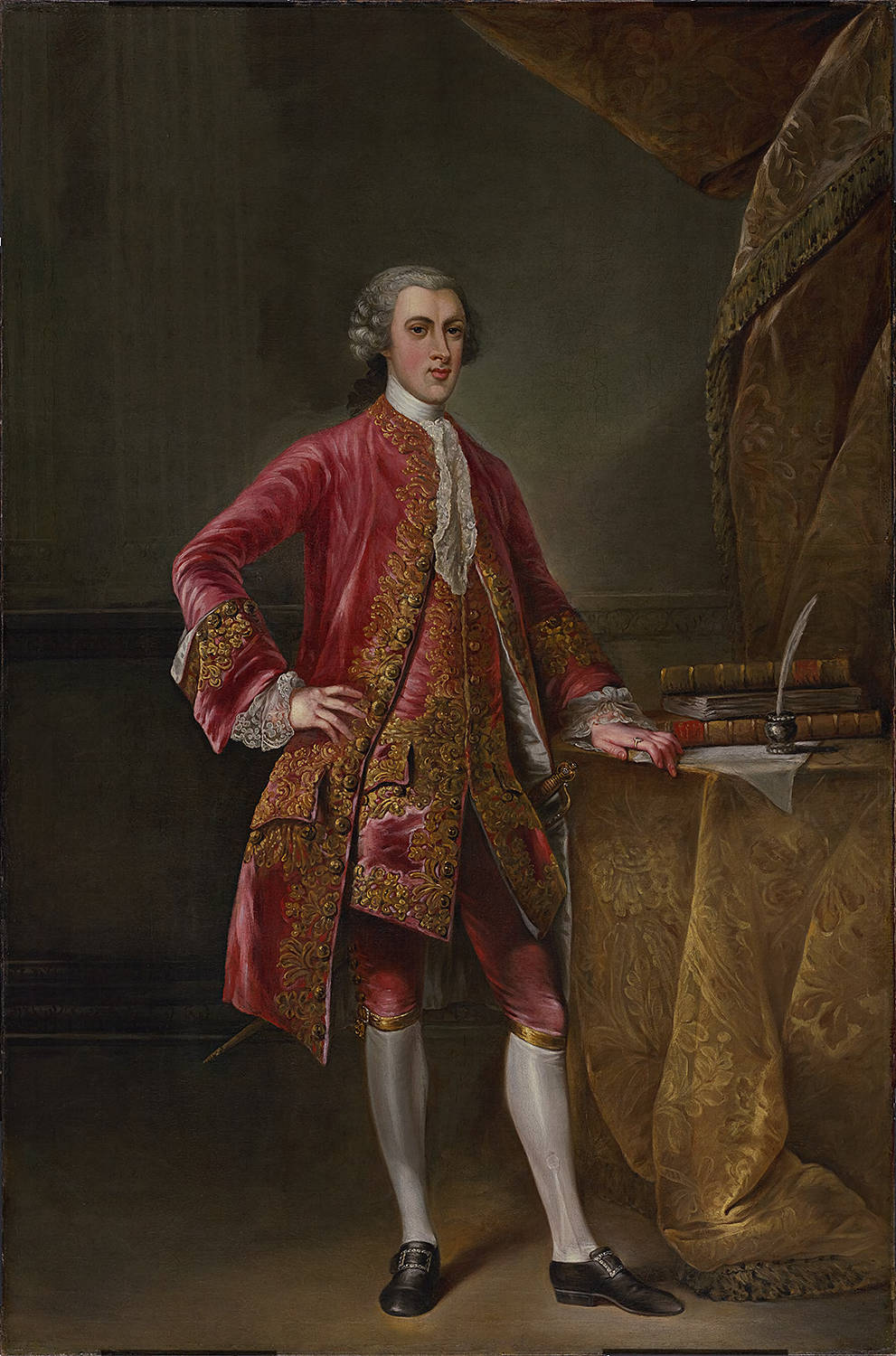
- Portrait, c. 1750
- Born: 6 February 1731; Epsom, Surrey, England
- Died: 4 September 1771 (aged 40); Naples
- Spouse: Lady Diana Egerton (m. 1753; died 1758)
- Children: 5, including Henry Harford
- Father: Charles Calvert, 5th Baron Baltimore

Frederick Calvert, 6th Baron Baltimore (6 February 1731 – 4 September 1771), styled The Hon. Frederick Calvert until 1751, was a British landowner who was the last Baron Baltimore. Although he exercised almost feudal power in the Province of Maryland, he never once set foot in the colony, and unlike his father, he took little interest in politics, treating his estates, including Maryland, largely as sources of revenue to support his extravagant, often scandalous lifestyle. In 1768, he was accused of abduction and rape by Sarah Woodcock, a noted beauty who kept a milliner's shop at Tower Hill. The jury acquitted Calvert, but he left England soon afterwards, and never recovered from the public scandal that surrounded the trial. Dogged by the criticism and poor health, he contracted a fever and died in Naples at the age of 40.

== Early life ==
Frederick Calvert was born in 1731, the eldest son of Charles Calvert, 5th Baron Baltimore, 3rd Proprietor Governor of Maryland (1699–1751). He was named after his godfather, Frederick, Prince of Wales, the eldest son of George II, and father of George III. The young Frederick was sent to Eton College to be educated from 1742 to 1748, where he acquired some proficiency in the classics. Calvert had two sisters, Caroline Calvert, born about 1745, and Louisa Calvert.

== Adulthood and inheritance ==
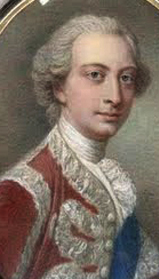
Frederick Calvert, 6th Lord Baltimore

In 1751 Charles Calvert died, and Frederick, aged just 20, inherited from his father the title Baron Baltimore and the Proprietary Governorship of the Province of Maryland, becoming at once both a wealthy nobleman in England and a powerful figure in America. Maryland was then a British colony administered directly by the Calverts. Frederick benefited from an income of some £10,000 a month from taxes and rents, an immense sum at the time. In addition, he controlled shares in the Bank of England, and an estate at Woodcote Park, in Surrey.

He had a mutually flattering correspondence in Latin with Carl Linnaeus, and once visited him in Uppsala during his European travels; both were fellows of the Royal Society of London.

=== Maryland ===
Calvert's inheritance coincided with a period of rising discontent in Maryland, amid growing demands by the legislative assembly for an end to his family's authoritarian rule. Calvert, however, took little interest in the colony and, unlike his predecessors, never set foot there. Instead, he lived in England and on the European continent, particularly in Italy and, for a time in Constantinople, which he was eventually forced to leave after being accused of keeping a private harem. Calvert lived a life of leisure, writing verse and regarding the Province of Maryland as little more than a source of revenue.

During the 1750s, during the French and Indian War, when funds were needed to finance the common defence of the colonies, Maryland alone refused its share. Calvert was prepared to pass an Act raising taxes but only if his own vast estates were exempted. Benjamin Franklin later wrote: "It is true, Maryland did not then contribute its proportion, but it was, in my opinion, the fault of the Government, and not of the people". The colony was ruled through governors appointed by Calvert, such as Horatio Sharpe and later Robert Eden. Governor Sharpe was keenly aware of the difficulties placed upon his subjects by Lord Baltimore's intransigence, but his hands were tied. Calvert oversaw the end of the long-running Penn–Calvert Boundary Dispute.

=== Marriage ===
On 9 March 1753, he married Lady Diana Egerton (3 March 1732 – 13 August 1758), youngest daughter of Scroop Egerton, 1st Duke of Bridgewater by Lady Rachel Russell. They were married at the Cavendish Square residence of Lady Rachael the Duchess of Bridgewater, and the following day they were received by King George II in St James's.

The union was not a success, and the couple spent most of their married life apart. They had no children, and in May 1756 they were formally separated due to "incompatibility of temper". In 1758, Lady Diana died, "from a hurt she received by a fall out of a Phaeton carriage", while accompanied by her husband. Although Calvert was suspected of foul play, no charges were brought.

=== European travels ===
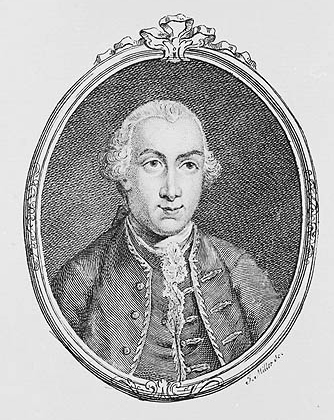
Engraving of Frederick Calvert, 6th Lord Baltimore

Calvert's reputation for exotic living spread quickly. On Friday 6 July, 1764, it was reported Calvert sold his house and park, to an undisclosed buyer.

In 1764 James Boswell (1740–1795) began his Grand Tour of Europe, having heard that Baltimore was "living at Constantinople like a Turk, with his seraglio all around him"." Boswell also observed that Baltimore "... lived luxuriously and inflamed his blood, then he became melancholy and timorous, and was constantly taking medicines... he is living a strange, wild, life, useless to his country, except when raised to a delirium, and must soon destroy his constitution".

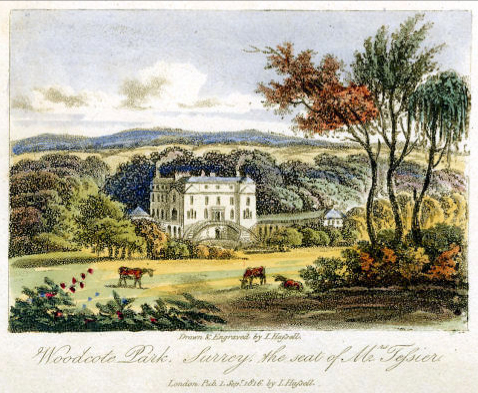
Calvert's family seat at Woodcote Park, Surrey, in an engraving by John Hassell circa 1816

Calvert spent a good deal of time in Italy, where the German art historian Johann Joachim Winckelmann (1717–1768) described him as being "one of those worn-out beings, a hipped Englishman, who had lost all physical and moral taste".

Such was Calvert's fascination with the Ottoman Turks that in 1766, on his return to England, he pulled down part of his London house, rebuilding it in the style of a Turkish harem. In 1767 Calvert published an account of his travels in the East, titled A tour to the East, in the years 1763 and 1764: with Remarks on the City of Constantinople and the Turks. Also Select Pieces of Oriental Wit, Poetry and Wisdom. The book, said Horace Walpole, "deserved no more to be published than his bills on the road for post-horses", adding that it demonstrated how "a man may travel without observation, and be an author without ideas". It gains a mention from a character in Tobias Smollett's epistolary novel The Expedition of Humphry Clinker.

Calvert's spending was prodigious, and he spent considerable sums of money on his family estate at Woodcote Park. According to Walpole, Calvert spent a great deal of money making the interior of the house "tawdry" and "ridiculous" in the "French" style.

== Trial, scandal and decline ==
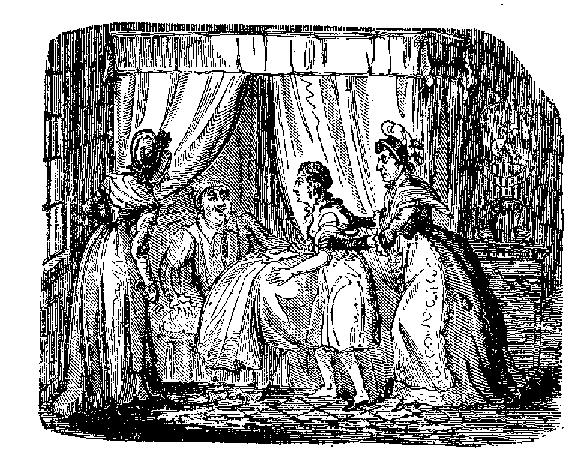
18th-century illustration of the alleged forcible introduction of Sarah Woodcock to Lord Baltimore. Baltimore was tried for rape in 1768 but was acquitted.

In 1768, Calvert was accused of abduction and rape by Sarah Woodcock, a noted beauty who kept a milliner's shop at Tower Hill. He was indicted at Kingston Assizes, and put on trial, pleading not guilty by reason of consent. After deliberating for an hour and twenty minutes the jury acquitted Calvert, believing that Woodcock did not make adequate attempts to escape.

Much salacious gossip accompanied the trial, and in the same year, one of Calvert's willing sexual partners, Sophia Watson, found it opportune to write a salacious autobiography entitled Memoirs of the Seraglio of the Bashaw of Merryland, by a Discarded Sultana (London, 1768) Her readers were left in no doubt as to whom she was referring to, which further harmed Baltimore's reputation. Sultana Watson offered many intimate details of life in the seraglio, including the predictable, unkind suggestion that Baltimore himself was barely able to satisfy one, let alone eight, mistresses.

Following his acquittal Frederick left England, presumably hoping that his notoriety did not extend to Europe. In this he seems to have been at least partly correct, as in July 1769 the British Ambassador to Russia reported that "Lord Baltimore arrived here last week from Sweden; I had the honour to present him to the Empress, who was pleased to receive his Ld extremely graciously." Nevertheless, Calvert's brush with the law does not appear to have affected his unconventional living arrangements. Count Maximilian von Lamberg wrote of his travels:

In 1769, my Lord was travelling with eight women, a physician, and two negroes, which he called his corregidores, who were entrusted with the discipline of his little seraglio. With the aid of his physician, he conducted odd experiments on his houris: he fed the plump ones only acid foods and the thin ones milk and broth. He arrived at Vienna with the train I have described; when the chief of police requested him to declare which of the eight ladies was his wife, he replied that he was an Englishman, and that when he was called upon to give an account of his sexual arrangements, if he could not settle the matter with his fists, it was his practice to set out instantly on his travels again.

By this time it is evident that he was suffering from financial difficulties, and in 1768 he sold the family's great estate at Woodcote Park, apparently to a wealthy Soho upholsterer.

=== Death in Naples ===
Calvert never returned to his native England. His mother, Mary Janssen, died at Chaillot, Paris, on 25 March 1770. He remained on the continent, "constantly moving ... that he might not know where he should be buried", and it was in Naples in September 1771 that he contracted a fever and died. His body was returned to London, lying in state at the Great Room of Exeter Exchange, Strand, and was interred in his family's vault at St. Martin's "with much funeral pomp, the cavalcade extending from the church to the eastern extremity of Epsom". According to Gentleman's Quarterly: "His Lordship had injured his character in his life by seduction, so that the populace paid no regard to his memory when dead, but plundered the room where his body lay the moment it was removed".

He was buried in Epsom, Surrey.

== Family and children ==
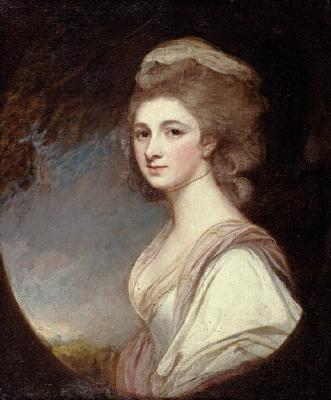
Calvert's daughter Frances Harford painted by George Romney in 1785

After his separation with Egerton, Calvert had numerous illegitimate children by various women, though he does appear to have attempted to support them. He is said to have left, on his death "a whole seraglio of white, black, etc, to provide for."

Calvert had two children by Hester Whelan:

- Henry Harford (1758–1835), the last Lord Proprietor of Maryland.
- Frances Mary Harford (1759–1822) who married William Frederick Wyndham (1763–1828) on 21 July 1784. Their son George Wyndham became the 4th Earl of Egremont.

In 1765, he fathered twin daughters with Elizabeth Dawson of Lincolnshire, Sophia and Elizabeth Hales.

He had another daughter, Charlotte Hope, born in Hamburg in 1770, with Elizabeth Hope of Münster, Germany.

== Maryland and the War of Independence ==
In his will, Calvert left his proprietary Palatinate of Maryland to his eldest (perhaps only confirmed) illegitimate son, Henry Harford, then aged just 13. This was done against the wishes of his family, though Calvert did provide for cash bequests to his sisters, specifically £20,000 to be divided between Louisa and Caroline. The colony, perhaps grateful to be rid of Frederick at last, duly recognised Harford as Calvert's heir. However, the will was challenged by the family of Calvert's sister, Louisa Calvert Browning, who did not recognise Harford's inheritance. Before the case could grind its way through the Court of Chancery, events in America changed Maryland forever. Unfortunately for the young Henry, by the time he had reached adulthood, Maryland had become engulfed by the American Revolution, and by 1776 was at war with Britain. Henry Harford ultimately lost almost all his colonial possessions, though he remained wealthy due to his extensive inheritance in Great Britain.

== Reputation and legacy ==
Coat of Arms of the Barons Baltimore

Official flag of the State of Maryland

Calvert was not generally well-regarded by his contemporaries. One characterised him as "Feeble in body, conceited, frivolous, and dissipated, but withal generous and sympathetic ... [a man] who gave himself up to a life of pleasure". Another described him as "a disreputable and dissolute degenerate". Posterity has been little kinder to his reputation.

A member of the Royal Society, he was noted more for his patronage of naturalists than any scientific contributions of his own.

Some have said that Frederick County, Maryland, is named after the last Baron Baltimore, but this remains unproven. The official flag of the State of Maryland, uniquely among the 50 states, bears witness to his family legacy.

== Published works ==
- A tour to the East, in the years 1763 and 1764: with Remarks on the City of Constantinople and the Turks. Also Select Pieces of Oriental Wit, Poetry and Wisdom, London (1767).
- Gaudia poetica Latina, Anglica, et Gallica Lingua Composita, London (1770).

== Arms ==
Coat of arms of Frederick Calvert, 6th Baron Baltimore

Coronet
A Coronet of a Baron
Crest
Out of a Ducal Coronet Or two Staves with Pennons flying to the dexter side the dexter Gold the sinister Sable
Escutcheon
Paly of six Or and Sable a Bend counterchanged
Supporters
On either side a Leopard guardant Or
Motto
Fatti maschii, parole femine (Manly deeds, womanly words)

== See also ==
- Baron Baltimore
- History of Maryland in the American Revolution
- Province of Maryland

Government offices
Preceded by The Lord Baltimore	Proprietor of Maryland; 1751–1771	Succeeded by Henry Harford
Peerage of Ireland
Preceded by Charles Calvert	Baron Baltimore; 1751–1771	Extinct
