= Baron Baltimore =

Noble rank held by the Calvert family (1625–1771)

Barony of Baltimore
- Creation date: 1625; 401 years ago
- Created by: James I
- Peerage: Peerage of Ireland
- First holder: Sir George Calvert
- Last holder: Frederick Calvert, 6th Baron Baltimore
- Remainder to: Heirs male of the body lawfully begotten
- Extinction date: 4 September 1771
- Motto: Fatti maschii, parole femine

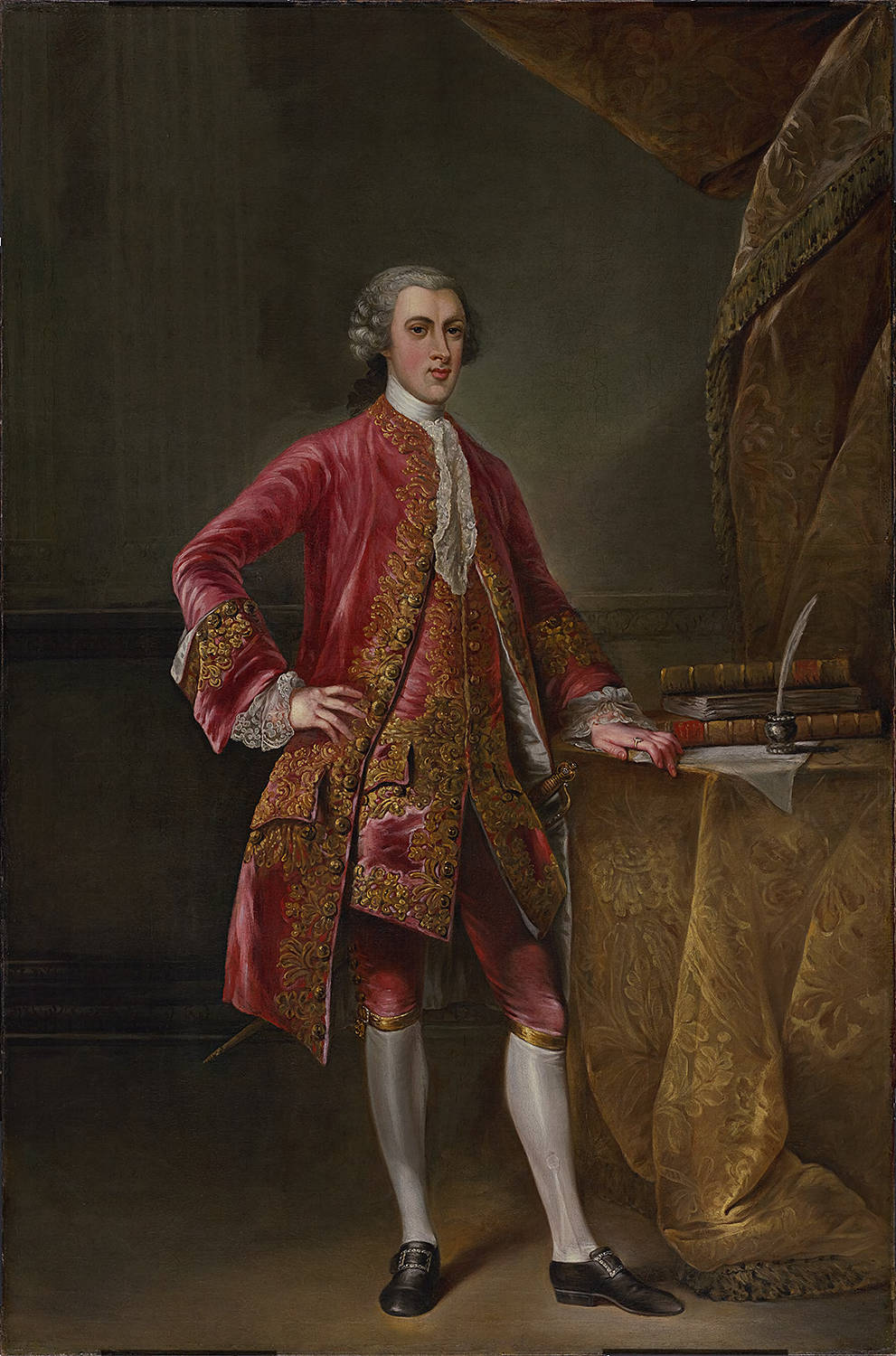
Frederick Calvert, 6th Baron Baltimore

Baron Baltimore, of Baltimore, County Longford, was a title in the Peerage of Ireland. It was created in 1625 and ended in 1771, upon the death of its sixth-generation male heir, aged 40. Holders of the title were usually known as Lord Baltimore.

== History ==
The title was granted in 1625 to Sir George Calvert (1580–1632), and it became extinct in 1771 on the death of Frederick, 6th Baron Baltimore. The title was held by six members/generations of the Calvert family, who were Lord proprietors of the palatinates Province of Avalon in Newfoundland and Maryland Palatinate (later the Province of Maryland and subsequent American State of Maryland).

A reference to "Lord Baltimore" is to any one of the six barons and most frequently in U.S. history to Cecil, 2nd Baron Baltimore (1600–1675, ruled 1632–1675), after whom the port city of Baltimore, Maryland (1729/1797) and surrounding Baltimore County (1659) were named, which took place in his lifetime due to his family's holdings. His father Sir George had supported English colonization of the North American territories, and his younger brother, Leonard Calvert (1606–1647, ruled 1634–1647), traveled across the Atlantic Ocean to become the first colonial Governor of Maryland.

== Barons Baltimore (1625–1771) ==
- Sir George Calvert, 1st Baron Baltimore (1579–1632)
- Cecilius Calvert, 2nd Baron Baltimore (1605–1675)
- Charles Calvert, 3rd Baron Baltimore (1637–1715)
- Benedict Leonard Calvert, 4th Baron Baltimore (1679–1715)
- Charles Calvert, 5th Baron Baltimore (1699–1751)
- Frederick Calvert, 6th Baron Baltimore (1731–1771)

== Family seats and abodes ==
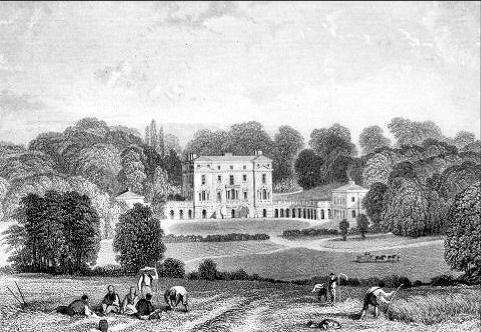
Woodcote Park seemingly sourced by Brayley from "Views of the Seats of Noblemen and Gentlemen in England, Wales, Scotland and Ireland. L.P", drawn by John Preston Neale in 1818. Part of a series of six volumes published from 1819 to 1823

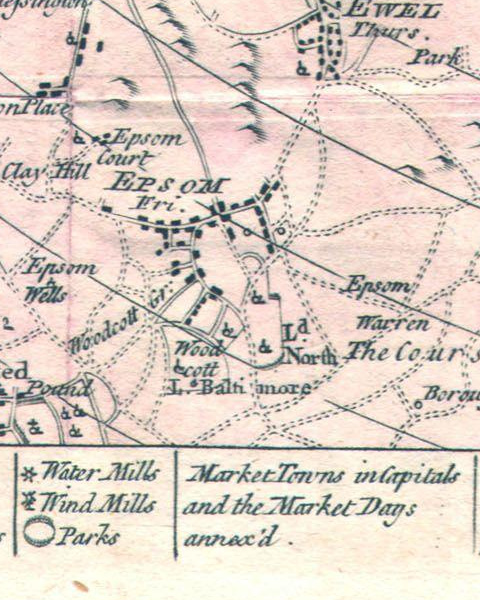
Extract from Gentleman's Magazine: Map of London & Environs, 1764 showing neighbouring mansion and park of Prime Minister (1772–1780) Lord North in Epsom, Surrey, England.

In the British Isles, the family's main home was a landscaped mansion and estate ("park") in the Home Counties. In 1705, the 4th Baron sold to the Crown a house and gardens (owned by virtue of his wife) known as Woodstock Park, which was promptly demolished and replaced by Blenheim Palace, a site regally granted to the victorious Duke of Marlborough as a gift. It swiftly became the only private mansion termed a palace in England; however, this loss was partially recouped when the 4th Baron inherited an additional manor house and farm in Epsom, Surrey, on the death of his distant cousin Lady Ann(s) Lewknor (née Mynne), his father having already owned, since 1692, from the death of Elizabeth Evelyn (née Mynne), a mid-17th century-built neighbouring fine house known as Woodcote Park. Its ownership in the family passed down to the heirs of the 6th Baron. His latter-day home in London itself was on Russell Square:

the handsome mansion on the south-east side of the square, at the corner of Guilford Street, was built, in 1759, for the eccentric and profligate Lord Baltimore ... it was at first called Baltimore House. Hither his lordship decoyed a young milliner, Sarah Woodcock, and was prosecuted for having caused her ruin, but acquitted. He died in 1771 at Naples, whence his remains were brought to London, and lay in state, as we have mentioned, at Exeter Change ... The house was subsequently occupied by the equally eccentric Duke of Bolton.

— E. Walford, Old and New London, Vol. 4, 1878

== Other notable Calverts ==
The Lords Baltimore had notable early siblings and descendants:

- Leonard Calvert (1606–1647), the first Governor of the Province of Maryland. He was the second/younger son of The 1st Baron Baltimore (Note: Barons, earls, viscounts and marquesses are since the Middle Ages save when being formally introduced are called "Lord...[name]") (1579–1632), to which the colony and province of Maryland were originally granted by King Charles I of England in 1632, and with the first Baron's eldest son and heir Cecilius, 2nd Baron Baltimore (1605–1675), to which the Maryland grant was extended, and who continued and planned to send the first group of settlers supervised by younger brother Leonard, on the ships The Ark and The Dove across the North Atlantic Ocean in late 1633 and early 1634.
- Phillip Calvert (1626–1682), proprietary/colonial fifth Governor of Maryland from 1660 to 1682. He was appointed by the royally chartered proprietor of the Province of Maryland, The 3rd Baron Baltimore, as a caretaker to replace insurgent leader Josias Fendall (1628–1687), who had assumed the governorship.
- Cpt. Charles Calvert (1680–1734), provincial/colonial fourteenth (14th) Governor of Maryland in 1720, at a time when the Calvert family had recently regained control of their proprietary colony. He was appointed Governor by his cousin, The 5th Baron Baltimore.
- Benedict Leonard Calvert (1700–1732), the proprietary/colonial fifteenth (15th) Governor of Maryland from 1727 through 1731, appointed by his brother, The 5th Baron Baltimore.
- Benedict Swingate Calvert (c. 1730–1788), the illegitimate son of The 5th Baron Baltimore, (the third Proprietor/Colonial Governor of Maryland). He was a Loyalist and Judge of the Land Office prior to the American Revolution (1775–1783).
- Eleanor Calvert (1758–1811), daughter-in-law of Martha Dandridge Washington and the stepdaughter-in-law of the General of the Continental Army and first President of the United States, George Washington (1732–1799).
- Henry Harford (1758–1834), 5th and last Proprietor of Maryland (1771–1776). He was the illegitimate son of The 6th Baron Baltimore, the last holder of the family peerage. Harford County, Maryland, split off and formed to the northeast from part of Baltimore County in 1774, is named for him.
- Rosalie Stier Calvert (1778–1821), Riversdale plantation owner with her husband George.
- George Henry Calvert (1803–1889), essayist, dramatist, poet, and biographer.
- Charles Benedict Calvert (1808–1864), U.S. Representative from Maryland's 6th congressional district, serving one term from 1861 to 1863, and the founder of the Maryland Agricultural College in 1856 (now the University of Maryland at College Park).

== Legacy ==
Flag of the State of Maryland

There are many locations in Maryland named after the Barons Baltimore ("Lords Baltimore"), including Baltimore County, Baltimore City, Calvert County, Cecil County, Charles County, Frederick County, Leonardtown, St. Leonard, and Calvert Cliffs. There are also Charles Street and Calvert Street in Baltimore.

Cecil Calvert, 2nd Baron Baltimore is the namesake of Cecil County, Maryland, Cecil Avenue, Cecil Elementary School and Calvert Street in Baltimore, along with another Calvert Street (alley) in Brooklyn (a South Baltimore city neighbourhood bordering suburban Anne Arundel County) and Calvert Street in Washington, D.C. His wife, Anne Arundell, is the namesake of Anne Arundel County, Maryland.

Harford County is named for Henry Harford (1758/1760–1835), the illegitimate son of Frederick, 6th and last Baron Baltimore (1731–1771). Leonardtown, Maryland, now county seat of St. Mary's, is named for the younger brother of the Cecil, 2nd Lord Baltimore, the 28-year-old Leonard Calvert (1606–1647), who arrived in the Colonial settling expedition of 1634 and set up the provincial government in the new capital of St. Mary's City.

The main downtown street in Cumberland, Maryland, is named Baltimore Street, along with Baltimore Avenue, the main north–south highway of commercial business along the Atlantic coast to the resort town of Ocean City. The Baltimore Road, which runs through the town of Bladensburg was made famous due to its role in the Battle of Bladensburg and the subsequent "Burning of Washington" during the War of 1812.

On the Avalon Peninsula in the Province of Newfoundland and Labrador of the northeastern Dominion of Canada, there is a settlement named Calvert, and in nearby Ferryland there is a "Baltimore School". There are also several other towns and villages across North America in the several states with the name of "Baltimore", "New Baltimore" or "Old Baltimore".

A life-sized bronze statue on a granite pedestal of Cecil, 2nd Lord Baltimore (1605–1675), is located on the steps of the western end at the St. Paul Street entrance of the Baltimore City Circuit Court House, the third courts structure on the nearby colonial-era Courthouse Square site (located to the east along North Calvert Street), constructed 1896–1900 (now renamed the Clarence M. Mitchell Jr. Courthouse since 1985 for a noted local and Civil Rights Movement leader, Clarence M. Mitchell Jr. [1911–1984], known as "The 101st Senator") in Baltimore, Maryland. The statue of Cecil, Lord Baltimore, sponsored by the Society of Colonial Wars in the State of Maryland, was dedicated November 21, 1908, and now faces a fountain and tree-shaded small plaza/park across the street, developed/laid out in 1964, between East Fayette and East Lexington Streets.

Before the American Revolution, a common flag used by military units of the colonial militia of the Province of Maryland was known as the Calvert Arms Flag. This flag had the original Union Jack from the Acts of Union 1707 as a canton in the upper corner, with a St. George's Cross and a St. Andrew's Cross to represent the patron saint of England and Scotland, respectively.

This Union Jack canton is in the upper corner of the banner over the black and gold (yellow) counterchanged bend depicted on the Calvert family's shield and coats-of-arms. Today, this historical colonial/provincial flag is often displayed throughout the state, especially at historical, heritage and festival events such as for the French and Indian War era, (1754–1763) at colonial Fort Frederick in Washington County in the mountainous western panhandle of the state.

The modern flag of the State of Maryland still bears the Calvert-Crossland family / Lord Baltimore coats-of-arms and shield, and has been used since the 1880s with the four quarters reunited after the tragic splits in the border states of the American Civil War, with the Northern Union Army regiments using the black and gold counterchanged bend and the Southern Confederate States Army units using the red/white trefoil cross botonee.

== See also ==
- Colonial families of Maryland
- Province of Maryland
- Henry Harford

== Notes and citations ==
Citations

== Other references ==
- Mosley, Charles (1999). Burke's Peerage and Baronetage. Vol. 2 vols (106th ed.).
