= Capital punishment in Maryland =

Capital punishment was abolished via the legislative process on May 2, 2013, in the U.S. state of Maryland.

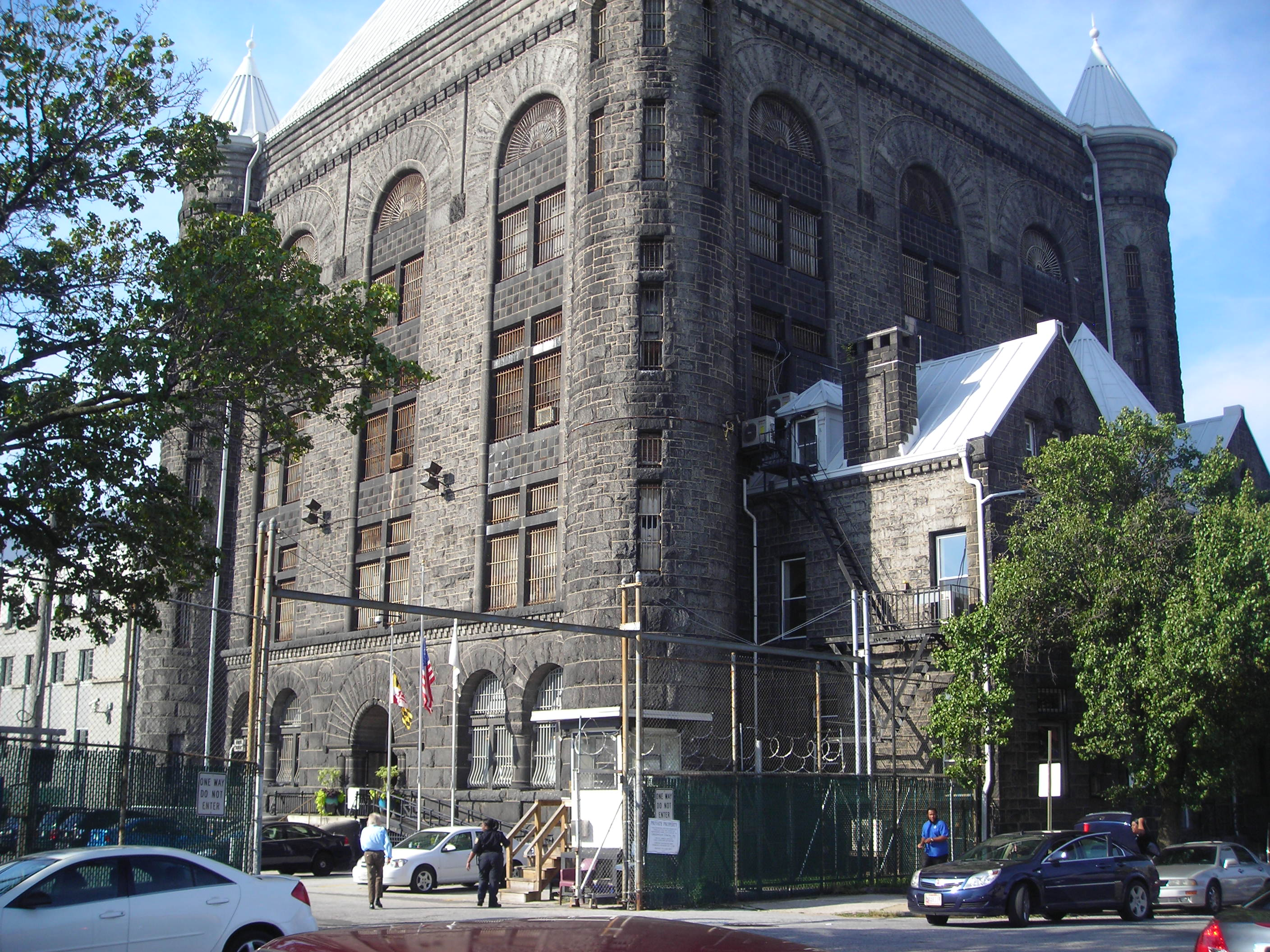
The Metropolitan Transition Center still houses Maryland's now defunct execution chamber.

Capital punishment had been in use in the state prior to its admittance to the Union as the Province of Maryland since June 20, 1638, when two men were hanged for piracy in St. Mary's County. At least 310 people were executed by a variety of methods from 1638 to June 9, 1961, the last execution before Furman v. Georgia, with capital punishment researcher Daniel Allen Hearn stating that over 755 people were executed. Since that time, five people were executed, the last being Wesley Baker in 2005.

The male death row was in the North Branch Correctional Institution in Western Maryland's Cumberland area. The execution chamber was in the Metropolitan Transition Center (the former Maryland Penitentiary) in Baltimore. The five men who were on the state's death row were moved in June 2010 from the Chesapeake Detention Facility.

== Early history ==
Up until the second half the 20th century, most executions were by hanging. Exceptions include a soldier shot for desertion, two slaves hanged in chains, and one female slave who was burned at the stake. All hangings were performed in public in the county where the offense took place.

In 1809, the Maryland legislature enacted laws that provided for murder in varying degrees. The mandatory punishment for first-degree murder was given as death. New laws came into force in 1908 which allowed the sentencing judge discretion, giving the option of life imprisonment. Then in 1916, the jury was given the option of deciding if they wished to impose the death penalty during their deliberations. They could now return a sentence of guilty "without capital punishment."

It was not uncommon for photographers to capture the final moments of a Maryland convict and offer these photos for sale following the execution. For example, on October 20, 1905, John M. Simpers was executed for murdering Albert Constable. A photographer permanently captured that autumn scene in a series of shots.

This changed under new state laws in 1922, which required all hangings to be executed at the Metropolitan Transition Center (formerly known as the Maryland Penitentiary) in Baltimore. It was designed to get rid of "the curious mobs that frequent hangings taking place in the counties of this State, and who attempt to make public affairs of the same." 75 men were hanged on the Penitentiary gallows, including 12 double hangings and two triple hangings. The first indoor hanging in the state, would come before this time though, with an execution on January 3, 1913, in the Baltimore City Jail, which only had invited guests present.

There were several instances of botched executions by hanging. For example, on January 30, 1930, John "Jack" Johnson stood on the trapdoor, having been convicted of a double murder. But as he fell through, the rope snapped and he fell to the ground below. He was left badly injured and carried to the top of the gallows on a stretcher. There, a new rope was placed around his neck and he was hanged, still supported by the stretcher.

The Maryland government decided in 1955 to change the method of execution from hanging to gas asphyxiation. A total of four men were executed by this method from 1957 to 1961.

== Recent history ==
After the Furman v. Georgia decision of the Supreme Court of the United States ruled that death penalty statutes were unconstitutionally arbitrary in their application, the Maryland legislature removed all arbitrariness by making death the mandatory punishment for first-degree murder once again. Such laws were found by the Supreme Court to be unconstitutional in Woodson v. North Carolina. As such, the Maryland legislature took the route which the Supreme Court had found acceptable in Gregg v. Georgia and introduced bifurcated trials, where the jury first decided guilt and then punishment, mandatory appellate review, and the weighing of aggravating and mitigating circumstances. Further laws changes in 1987 and 1989 excluded juveniles and people who had intellectual disabilities from execution.

The first person to be sentenced to death under Maryland's current statute was Richard Danny Tichnell, who was found guilty of murdering Garrett County Sheriff's Deputy David Livengood in 1979. Tichnell's sentence was overturned on appeal, as were two successive death sentences that prosecutors won against him. A fourth jury declined to impose the death penalty, and Tichnell died in 2006 of natural causes while serving a life sentence.

In 1994, the method was changed to lethal injection for those convicted after March 25, 1994. For those sentenced before March 25, 1994, the condemned is given the choice between lethal injection and gas inhalation. John Thanos was put to death using lethal injection on May 16, 1994. This was the first execution in Maryland in over 30 years. Governor Parris N. Glendening halted executions in Maryland by executive order on May 9, 2002, while a state-ordered University of Maryland, College Park study of capital punishment was conducted. The subsequent governor, Robert Ehrlich, ended the moratorium and resumed executions in 2004.

In 2001, Governor Glendening granted a posthumous pardon to John Snowden, a black man who was executed in 1919 for the murder of Lottie May Brandon, a pregnant white woman, in Annapolis. His conviction was based on the testimony of two neighbors that a man resembling Snowden had left the victim's house. Snowden never confessed to the murder and may have been tortured by the police while in custody. He maintained his innocence to the end.

=== Administrative law challenge ===
In 2006, the Maryland Court of Appeals in Evans v. Maryland ruled that state executions would be suspended because the manual that spells out the protocol for lethal injections was not adopted using the process required by the state Administrative Procedures Act (APA). The state APA requires state administrative agencies to adopt regulations, which are defined as statements that have general application and are adopted by an agency to detail or carry out a law that the agency administers, using a process that includes a review by the Attorney General, review by a legislative committee, and publication for public notice and comment. The state's Department of Public Safety and Correctional Services had adopted the manual without following any of these activities. The Court of Appeals noted that the procedures for execution in the manual were clearly regulations, and because they had not been properly adopted, they could not be used until they had been either adopted as required by the APA or the state law was changed. The ruling in Evans, while not significant from an administrative law aspect as it was consistent with state case law, prevented executions until an agreement was reached regarding both the need for the death penalty and in the method and procedure to be used to carry it out.

=== Abolition ===
The Maryland General Assembly in 2008 established the Maryland Commission on Capital Punishment to provide recommendations concerning the application and administration of capital punishment in the state so that they are free from bias and error and achieve fairness and accuracy. Following a series of public hearings, the Commission submitted its final report, along with a minority report, to the General Assembly on December 12, 2008, which "strongly recommends that capital punishment be abolished in Maryland."

On March 6, 2013, the Maryland State Senate voted 27–20 in favor of SB 276, a bill to repeal the death penalty for future offenders. On March 15, 2013, the House approved the legislation by an 82–56 vote and sent the bill to Governor Martin O'Malley, who then signed it into law on May 2, 2013, declaring Maryland the 18th state in the US to ban the death penalty.

At the time of the repeal, only five inmates were on death row in Maryland: John Booth-El, Vernon Lee Evans, Anthony Grandison, Heath William Burch, and Jody Lee Miles. As the repeal was not retroactive, their death sentences were left in limbo. On April 27, 2014, staff found Booth-El dead in his cell. He died of natural causes before his fate was determined, after spending nearly three decades on death row. O'Malley announced on December 31, 2014, that he would commute the sentences of the four remaining death-row inmates to life in prison without the possibility of parole.

=== Federal execution ===
Maryland's stance on capital punishment garnered attention and significance in January 2021. Dustin Higgs, a man sentenced to death by the United States federal government in 2000, was executed on January 16, 2021. Higgs, the first person from Maryland to be sentenced to death in the federal court system, was tried by the federal government (in addition to the state of Maryland) because the crime he was convicted of took place on federal land at the Patuxent Research Refuge in Prince George's County. Maryland House of Delegates Speaker Adrienne A. Jones had urged Governor Larry Hogan to intervene and push for a halt to the execution. The execution was carried out on January 16, 2021, via lethal injection.

== Former status ==
Maryland has not had a death penalty since Gov. Martin O'Malley signed a bill on May 2, 2013. Before the Governor signed the bill, only first-degree murder was a capital offense in the state of Maryland when it involved one of the following aggravating factors:

1. The murder was committed against a law enforcement officer while the officer was performing the officer's duties;
2. The defendant committed the murder while confined in a correctional facility;
3. The defendant committed the murder in furtherance of an escape from, an attempt to escape from, or an attempt to evade lawful arrest, custody, or detention by a guard or officer of a correctional facility; or a law enforcement officer;
4. The victim was taken or attempted to be taken in the course of an abduction, kidnapping, or an attempt to abduct or kidnap;
5. The victim was a child abducted;
6. The defendant committed the murder under an agreement or contract for remuneration or promise of remuneration to commit the murder;
7. The defendant employed or engaged another to commit the murder and the murder was committed under an agreement or contract for remuneration or promise of remuneration;
8. The defendant committed the murder while under a sentence of death or imprisonment for life;
9. The defendant committed more than one murder in the first degree arising out of the same incident; or
10. The defendant committed the murder while committing, or attempting to commit arson in the first degree, carjacking or armed carjacking, rape in the first degree, robbery, or sexual offense in the first degree.

Under Criminal Law § 2–303, the sentence of death is imposed:

…by intravenous administration of a lethal quantity of an ultrashort-acting barbiturate or other similar drug in combination with a chemical paralytic agent.

The lethal injection procedure used in Maryland consisted of the anesthetic drug sodium pentothal, followed by the paralytic drug pancuronium bromide, which is also known as Pavulon, and lastly a drug which stops the heart, potassium chloride. The execution is completed when, using an electrocardiogram, a physician declares the convict to be dead.

Unlike most states, Maryland did not offer the condemned a special last meal; instead the prisoner received whatever food the general prison population is served the day of the convict's death.

== See also ==
- List of people executed in Maryland
- Crime in Maryland
- Annotated Code of Maryland
