= Carolyn Scruggs =

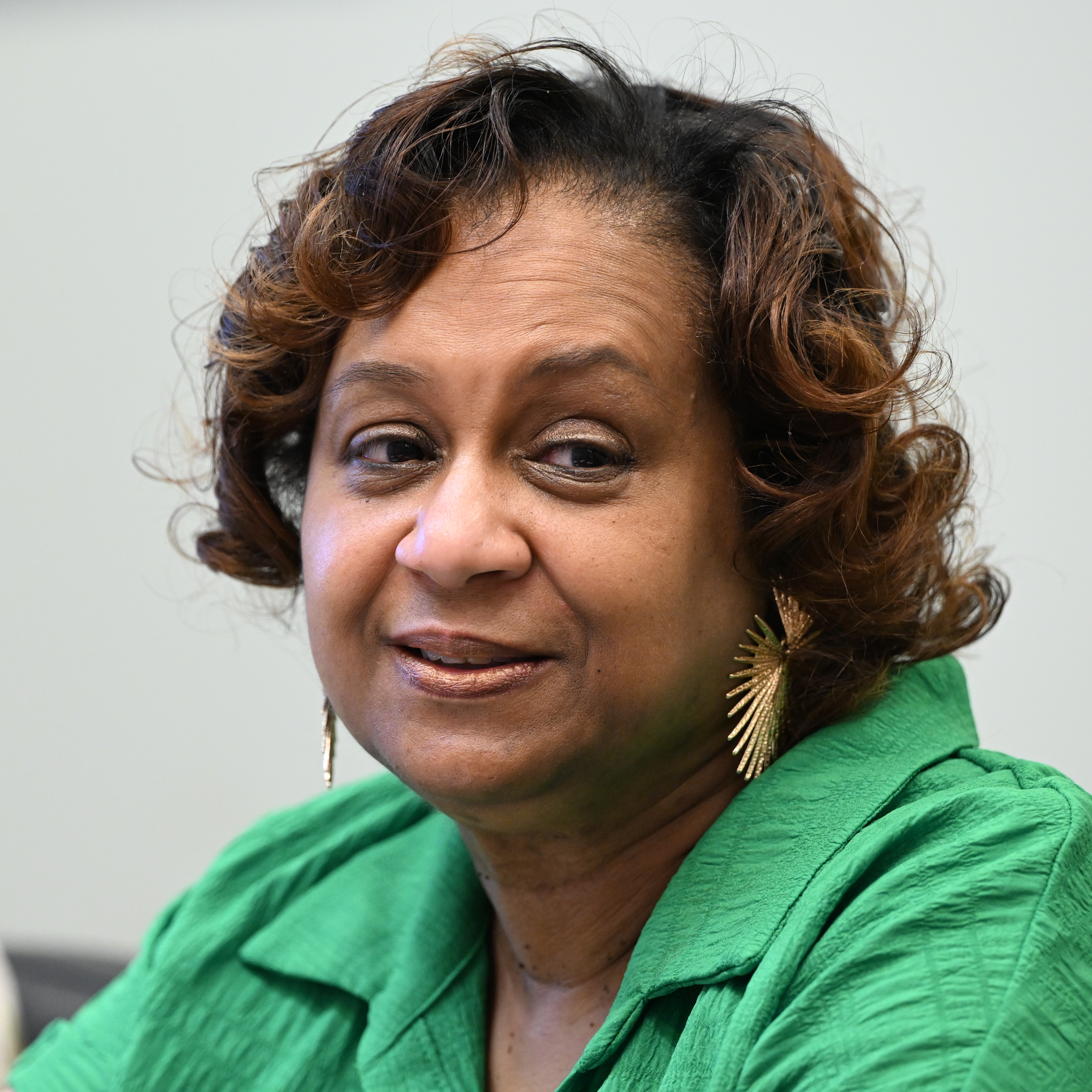
- Scruggs in 2026
- Born: Oliver, Baltimore
- Education: Towson State University, Coppin State University.
- Known for: leading the Maryland Department of Public Safety and Correctional Services

Carolyn Scruggs is an American executive who was the secretary of the Maryland Department of Public Safety and Correctional Services from 2023 to 2026. She is the first African-American woman to lead the agency.

== Early life ==
Scruggs was brought up in Oliver, Baltimore. Her father, Calvin Scruggs, ran a funeral home.

== Career ==
In 1995 Scruggs became a correctional officer at Maryland's Central Booking.

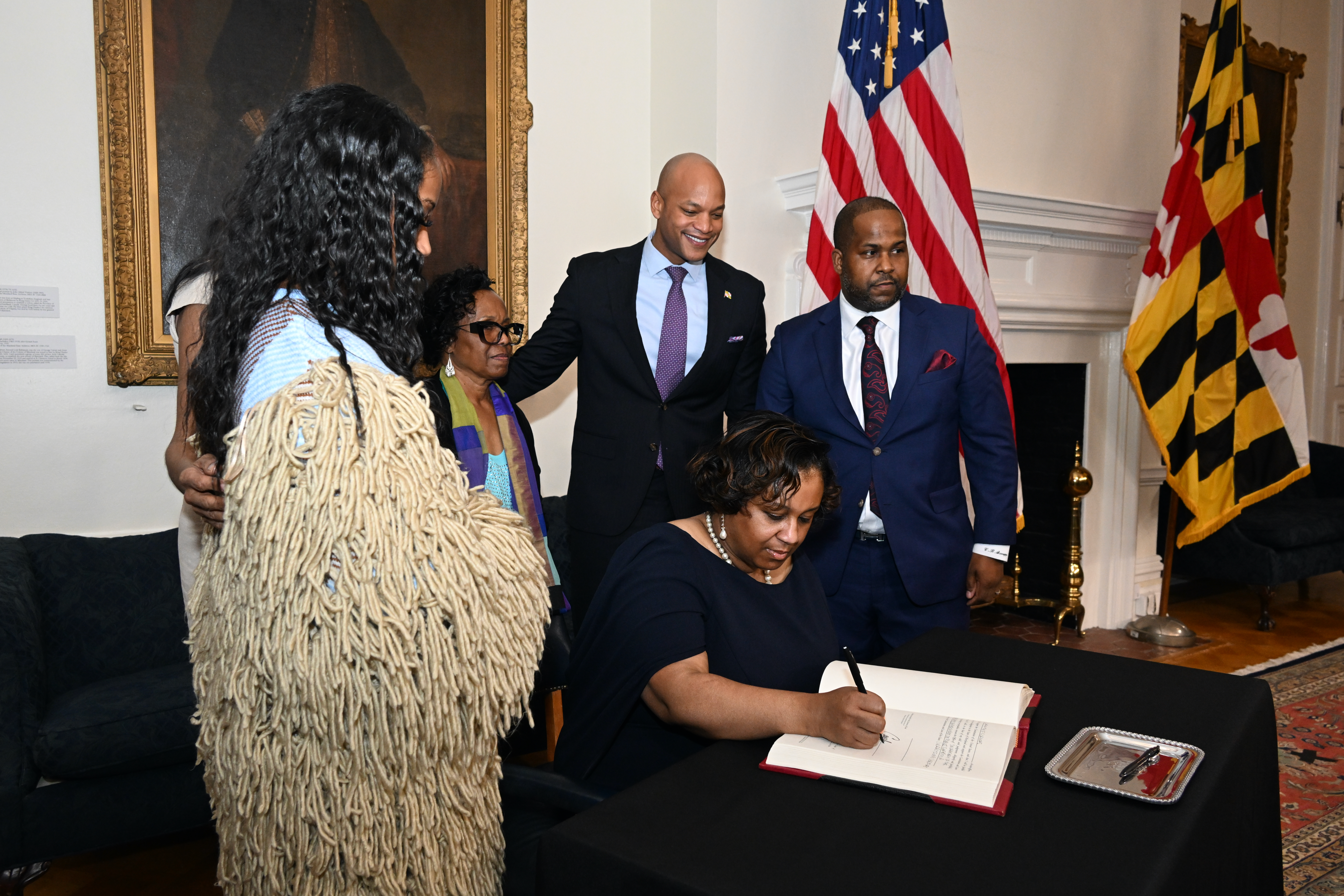
Wes Moore Swearing in Cabinet Member Carolyn Scruggs in March 2023.

Governor-elect Wes Moore appointed Scruggs to lead the Department of Public Safety and Corrections in 2023. She was the first black woman to that department where she had worked for 27 years. She has a Master's Degree in Criminal Justice Administration from Baltimores's Coppin State University. She was appointed on the same day as Russell Strickland was re-appointed Secretary of Emergency Management, Harold “Bud” Frank became deputy Chief of Staff and Katie Savage became the Secretary of Information Technology.

In May 2025, Parole Agent Davis Martinez was murdered while making a home visit. Three managers resigned and Scruggs said that home visits would not continue until staff had received additional equipment and training.

Scruggs estimated that the Maryland Correctional Institution - Jessup would need $200 million in renovations to bring it up to standard and that its closure would save the state $21 million a year in operational costs. On September 29, 2025, Governor Wes Moore announced that the prison was to close.

In November 2026, The Baltimore Banner announced that Scruggs had resigned as secretary of the Maryland Department of Public Safety and Corrections.
