= Occupy Baltimore =

Protest

- Part of the "Occupy" protests
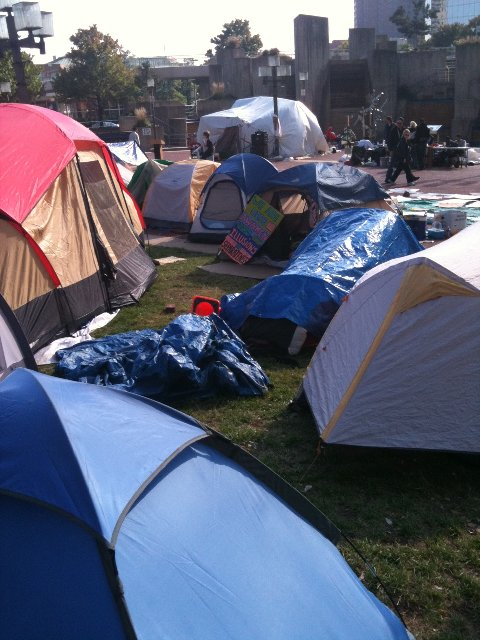
- Tents erected at McKeldin Square
- Date: October 4, 2011
- Location: Baltimore, Maryland
- Methods: Demonstration, occupation, protest, street protesters

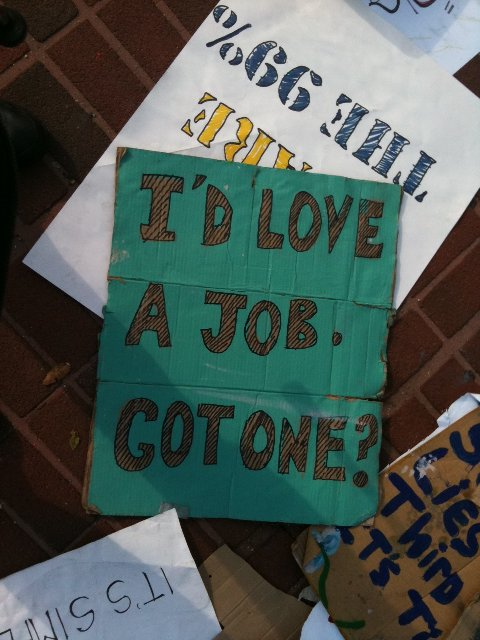
Assorted signs used in protest

Occupy Baltimore was a collaboration that included peaceful protests and demonstrations. Occupy Baltimore began on October 4, 2011, in Baltimore, Maryland, in McKeldin Square near the Inner Harbor area of Downtown Baltimore. It is one of the many Occupy movements around the United States and worldwide, inspired by Occupy Wall Street.

The protesters were banned from McKeldin Square on December 13, 2011.

== Origin ==
The occupation of McKeldin Square began on October 4, 2011. This came after a meeting held on October 2 by 150 people at a different location. Those holding the meeting requested that a Baltimore Sun reporter leave.

== Messages ==
Organizers from the beginning did not have a single ideology. Various messages have been voiced by protesters. These include:

- Shortages of jobs
- Frustrations over the economy
- Demands for greater public input in urban planning.
- Student loans that are difficult to pay off.

On November 20, 2011, the Occupy Baltimore general assembly approved a more comprehensive statement explaining its message. The statement expressed solidarity with the larger Occupy movement and thanks to various Baltimore unions for their letter of support. It also specifically defended the right of demonstrators to an ongoing encampment at McKeldin Fountains:

...through trial and error, we are creating a new system. In our community, everyone gets a hot meal, healthcare, and a voice in direct democracy. It says: there is another way, and we are building it. There are social ills that run deep in the veins of the city. Drug abuse, violence, and theft are symptoms of systemic poverty, not of Occupy Baltimore. Our encampment highlights their existence in an area of the city that usually has the privilege of ignoring them. This ignorance has been facilitated by the City, which typically treats symptoms of poverty rather than their cause. Instead of attacking the messenger, we call for the Baltimore City to enact real and sustainable policies that will address these problems and treat victims with humanity and respect. We call for the city, our country, and our global community to recognize and end their own complicit behavior in real crimes, the enabling of corporate tyranny and an unjust distribution of wealth.

== Events ==
=== Disruption of Karl Rove ===
On November 15, protesters interrupted a speech given by Karl Rove on the Johns Hopkins University campus. They stated that Rove had "occupied" Iraq and Afghanistan.

=== Howard Street Bridge ===
On November 17, 2011, protesters marched on the Howard Street Bridge. The bridge was chosen by the protesters because they said it was a symbol of the city's decaying infrastructure and the need to get Americans back to work.

=== Occupy Our Homes ===
As part of Occupy Our Homes, Occupy Baltimore has begun a project of defending homes threatened with foreclosure.

Their first case was a house on West Lombard Street whose residents were threatened with eviction by Deutsche Bank. The group joined with residents of the neighborhood to physically defend the house from foreclosure by the sheriff. They guarded the house during the two-hour window in which the eviction was announced to occur.

The sheriff arrived unannounced the next day, along with a presumed representative of Deutsche Bank who refused to identify herself or talk to the homeowner. Locks on the house were change and all property inside was confiscated.

=== Schools Not Jails ===
Starting January 16, 2012, Occupy Baltimore launched a protest of Maryland's planned youth jail in Baltimore City. As part of their "Schools Not Jails Occupation" campaign, Occupy Baltimore activists entered a fenced site (owned by the Maryland Department of Public Safety and Correctional Services) and began to build a red-painted plywood structure to represent schoolhouse. After negotiating with the activists in a bid to get them to leave, Maryland State Police arrested six people for trespass, and dismantled the building.

Members of the media complain that they were kept well away from the site of arrests.

=== "Rec Center" ===
On January 20, 2012, protesters demonstrated at the War Memorial near Baltimore's City Hall. They jumped rope, hula-hooped, and juggled in support of Baltimore's endangered recreation centers. They brought a large prop: a piece of plywood painted to look like the front of a cartoon rec center. Before they could bring the "rec center" to the site of the demonstration, they were stopped by a police officer backed by a SWAT team. Claiming that the protesters were blocking traffic, police confiscated the sign and threw it in a dumpster. Representatives from the ACLU suggest that the police's actions may have violated the demonstrators' first amendment rights.

== Controversies ==
=== Emails to the Mayor ===
In January 2012, the Baltimore Sun obtained a set of emails received and by the mayor's office. These emails suggested private collusion between business owners and the city on the topic of Occupy Baltimore. These emails include:

- A message from Deputy Mayor Christopher Thomaskutty to Constellation Energy alerting them to protest activity.
- An expectation of local [corruption] within the [AFL-CIO]: "'Isnt ernie [sic] on the payroll,' O'Doherty wrote of AFL-CIO president Ernie Grecco."
- An admission by mayoral spokesperson Ryan O'Doherty that one of the primary motivations for shutting down the camp was the desire to maintain a pristine site for the Mayor's lighting of a menorah.

The emails also revealed that the city incurred no extra expenses associated with the ongoing encampment. The Sun also noted that the mayor received many emails from students and community leaders supporting the movement. The paper also points out that the city withheld a number of emails, including those referring to police strategy and to the decisions leading up to eviction.

=== Legality ===
On October 25, City Hall declared the encampment was illegal on the basis that McKeldin Square is not a campground. The city stated that anyone is free to protest at the location, but not to camp overnight. Mayor Stephanie Rawlings-Blake said each illegal act would be handled on a "case-by-case basis." the city stated that they wanted to avoid a violent confrontation.

The ACLU has defended the movement as constitutionally protected free speech.

Toward the end of November, the movement applied for a 6-month permit to occupy McKeldin Square and to set up 4 large and up to 40 personal tents. The city denied the permit on the basis that permits are not issued for more than 5 days or 150 people.

=== Concert cancellation ===
Protesters blamed Baltimore Police for forcing the cancellation of a November 12 concert by the band Celebration. The concert was cancelled over safety concerns.

=== Cutting off of power ===
On November 2, the city cut off power to the occupiers at McKeldin Square, citing safety concerns. The protesters had been using the electrical outlets at the square for their basic needs, including heating food and charging cell phones and laptops. The protesters said this would not stop them. Protesters responded by setting up solar panels and by attempting to set up a bicycle-based power generator.

== Crime at McKeldin Square ==
=== Rape and robbery allegations ===
On Friday, October 28, a woman claimed she had been sexually assaulted in her tent and robbed of $1800 cash. She said she could not go home because the attackers had taken her bills and knew where she lived. A 38-year-old man was taken into custody, though no evidence of a sexual assault was found.

=== Stabbing ===
On December 5, a woman was allegedly stabbed by another woman in a fight over not taking care of her cat. A 23-year-old woman was arrested as the prime suspect in the incident, marking the first protest-related arrest.

== Camp eviction ==
On December 13, 2011, the Occupy Baltimore protesters were evicted from McKeldin Square at 3:15 AM. Police arrived in riot gear, closed off surrounding streets, and allowed protesters to retrieve their personal belongings prior to departure. The protesters left peacefully. There were no arrests. Of the 40 people who departed, 18 accepted shelter services the city offered on the spot.

The protesters planned to hold a meeting regarding their next plans, and vowed to continue.

== See also ==
Occupy articles

- List of global Occupy protest locations
- Occupy movement
- Timeline of Occupy Wall Street
- We are the 99%

Other protests

- 15 October 2011 global protests
- 2011 United States public employee protests
- 2011 Wisconsin protests

Baltimore

- Baltimore Development Corporation
- Baltimore Police Department
- History of Baltimore
- Paul Pojman
- Stephanie Rawlings-Blake
- The Baltimore Sun

Related articles

- Arab Spring
- Corruption Perceptions Index
- Economic inequality
- Grassroots movement
- Homelessness in the United States
- Income inequality in the United States
- Lobbying
- Plutocracy
- Tea Party protests
- Wealth inequality in the United States
