= Elmer P. Martin Jr. =

American sociologist (1946–2001)

Elmer P. Martin Jr. (October 31, 1946 – 2001) was an African-American sociologist and museum executive.

He was a professor of Social Work at Morgan State University. Prior to becoming the chairman, Martin taught sociology at the university for more than 25 years. He was also the creator of the first wax museum dedicated to black history, Great Blacks In Wax in the inner city of Baltimore. Martin and his wife Joanne opened the museum on July 9, 1983, with only four wax figures: Frederick Douglass, Mary McLeod Bethune, Harriet Tubman, and Nat Turner. They had the heads of the figures made for them, and used old department store mannequins for the bodies. The couple was inspired to open the museum after they visited a wax museum while on vacation in Florida. Elmer Martin wanted to teach about black history in a way that would grab kids' attention. He and his wife wanted for their kids to have a sense of pride and history for their heritage. The wax figures in the museum include everything from former slaves to doctors, lawyers, and businessmen.

The museum also includes a graphic scene of a man being lynched, a controversial scene to many. Elmer Martin, however, believed that it is necessary for the children to see what other historical figures had to overcome, to fully understand how great their accomplishments were. The Martins did, nevertheless, try to keep the number of athletes and entertainers on display to a minimum. They believe children know enough about those, and they need to know that there are black men and women who accomplished more. Over the years the couple received more than $300,000 in grants to renovate and update the museum, and it is still growing. Martin died of a heart attack in June 2001 while he and his wife were on a trip to Egypt doing research. His wife still runs the museum, and credits his vision for all of its success, and for teaching young African American children about their history.

Martin had two children: Daughters- Bertina Martin-Wilson, and Lisa Martin; 2 grandchildren: Brittnae' Wilson and Kevin Wilson.
