= Oliver, Baltimore =

Oliver
- Neighborhood of Baltimore
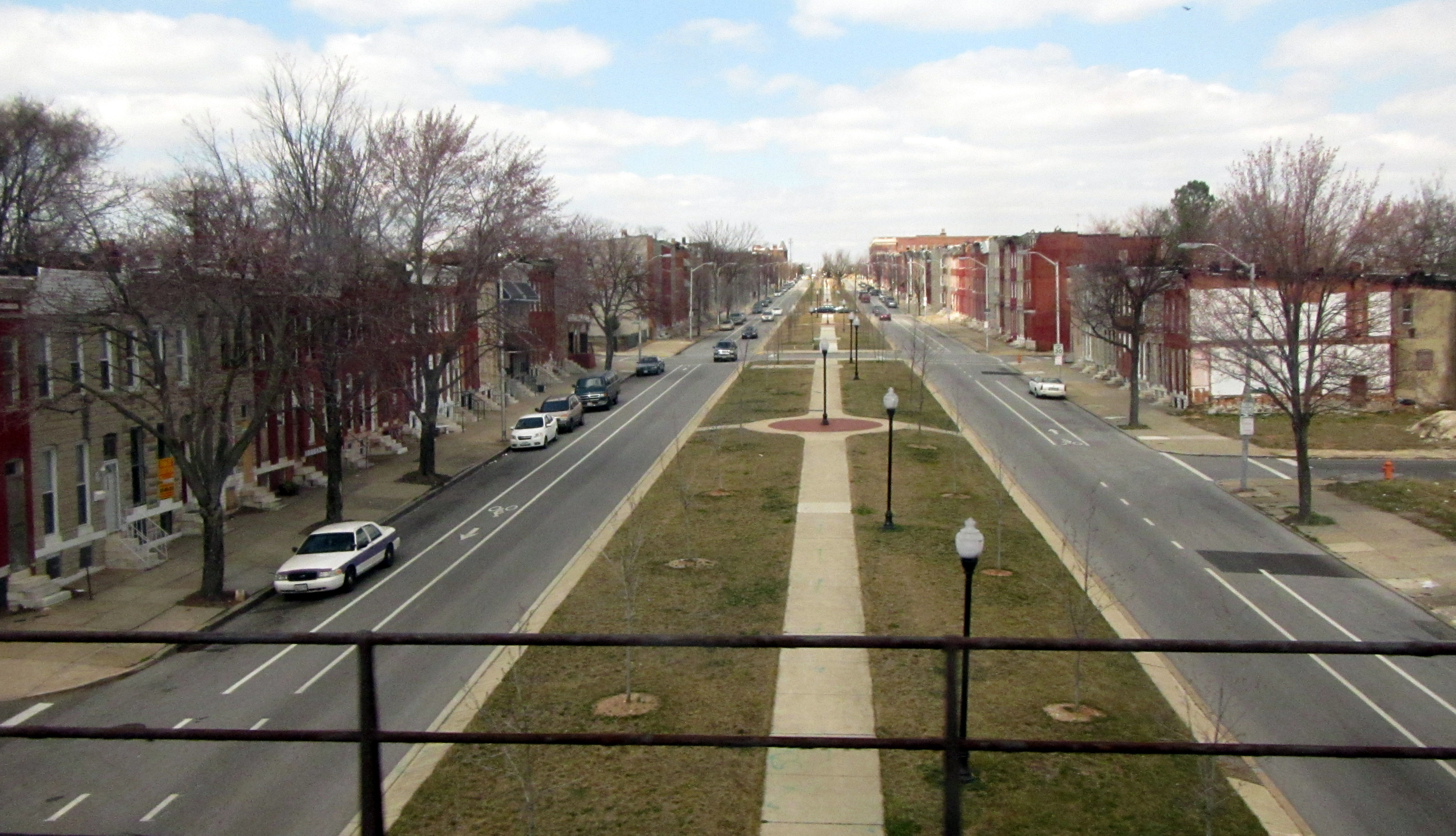
- North Broadway in Oliver viewed from the Baltimore Belt Line railroad.

- Location within Baltimore
- Coordinates: 39°18′28.08″N 76°35′57.84″W
- Country: United States
- State: Maryland
- City: Baltimore
- Time zone: UTC-5 (Eastern)
  - Summer (DST): EDT
- ZIP code: 21213
- Area code: 410, 443, and 667

Oliver is a neighborhood in the Eastern district of Baltimore, Maryland. Its boundaries are the south side of North Avenue, the east side of Ensor Street, the west side of Broadway, and the north side of Biddle Street. This neighborhood, adjacent to Johns Hopkins Medical Campus and minutes from the Inner Harbor, lies east of the historic Greenmount Cemetery. The neighborhood is accessible by several bus lines, the Johns Hopkins metro station, Charm City Circulator, Pennsylvania Station (Baltimore), and freeway.

In the past, Oliver has experienced economic depression, housing abandonment, and the after-effects of the Baltimore riot of 1968. In recent years, a steadily increasing number of diverse families and young professionals have returned to the Oliver community. In hand with long term homeowners, new homeowners are experiencing a transforming community.

The neighborhood was a filming location for the Baltimore-based HBO drama The Wire, and was the home of the Baltimore chapter of the Black Panther Party. Neighborhood attractions include The National Great Blacks In Wax Museum.

== Demographics ==
According to the 2010 census, the neighborhood had a total population of 4,153 people; 96.7% African-American, 1.3% White, 0.3% Asian, and 2.5% from some other or multiple ethnicities.

Though the area was once considered middle-class, it has in the last century experienced economic depression and housing abandonment. As of 2000, 25.0% of all housing units were vacant. In recent years, this neighborhood has begun to rebuild new, affordable, energy efficient townhomes.

Several organizations are revitalizing the area, including the Oliver Community Association, Come Home Baltimore, The 6th Branch, Oliver Beautification Alliance and the Oliver Economic Development Corporation.

== People ==
Carolyn Scruggs was brought up in Oliver and she became the first black woman to lead Maryland's Department of Public Safety and Corrections.

== See also ==
- Dawson murder case
- National Great Blacks in Wax Museum
- St. Francis Xavier Church (Baltimore)
