= USS Pennsylvania (SSBN-735) =

Submarine of the United States

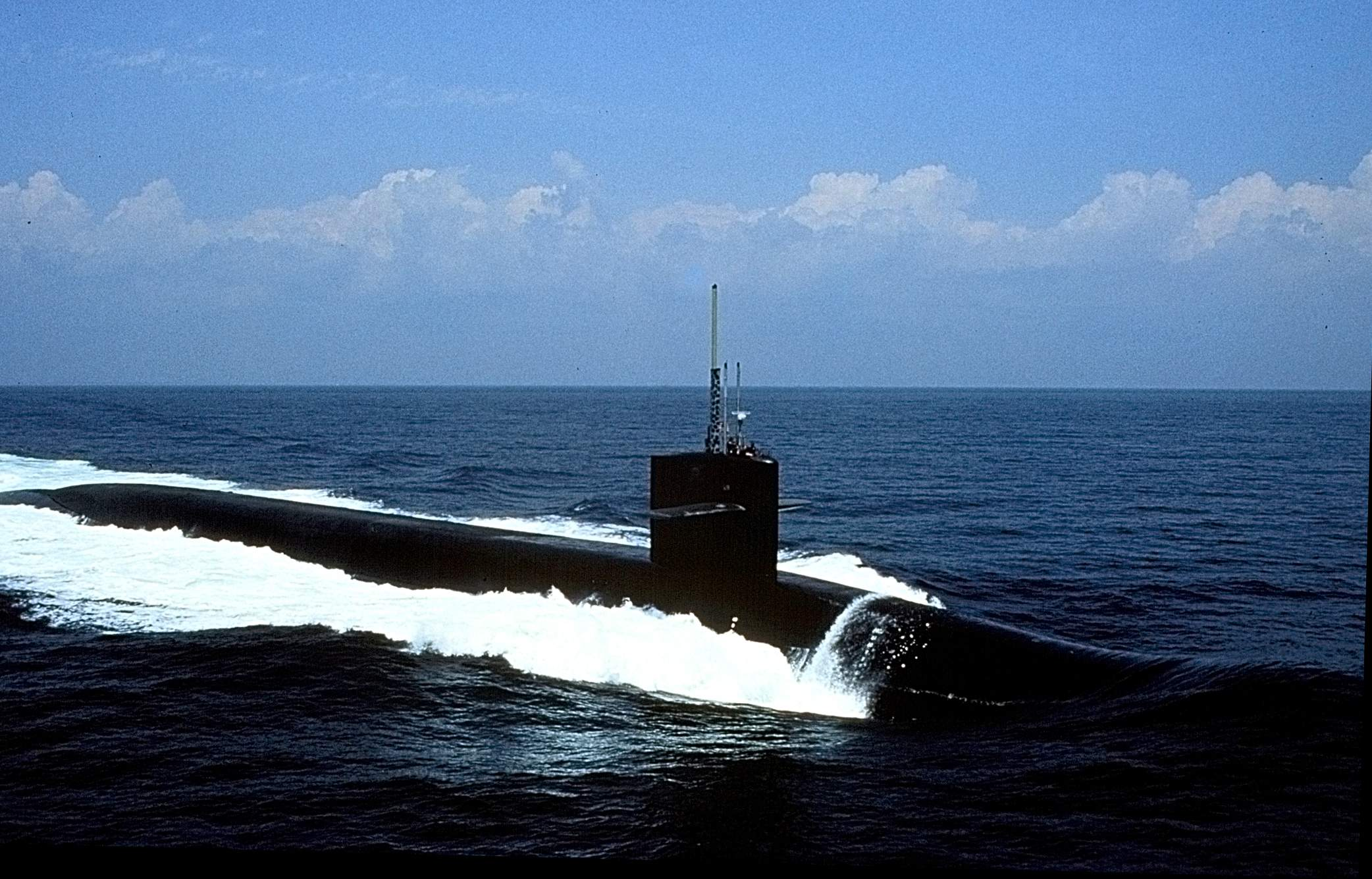
- USS Pennsylvania (SSBN-735)

History

United States
- Name: USS Pennsylvania
- Namesake: Commonwealth of Pennsylvania
- Ordered: 29 November 1982
- Builder: General Dynamics Electric Boat, Groton, Connecticut
- Cost: 72 Billion USD
- Launched: 23 April 1988
- Commissioned: 9 September 1989
- Home port: Kings Bay, GA
- Identification: SSBN-735
- Motto: Virtue, Independence, Liberty
- Honors and awards: Marjorie Sterrett Battleship Fund Award 2001, Battle Effectiveness Award 2022
- Status: in active service
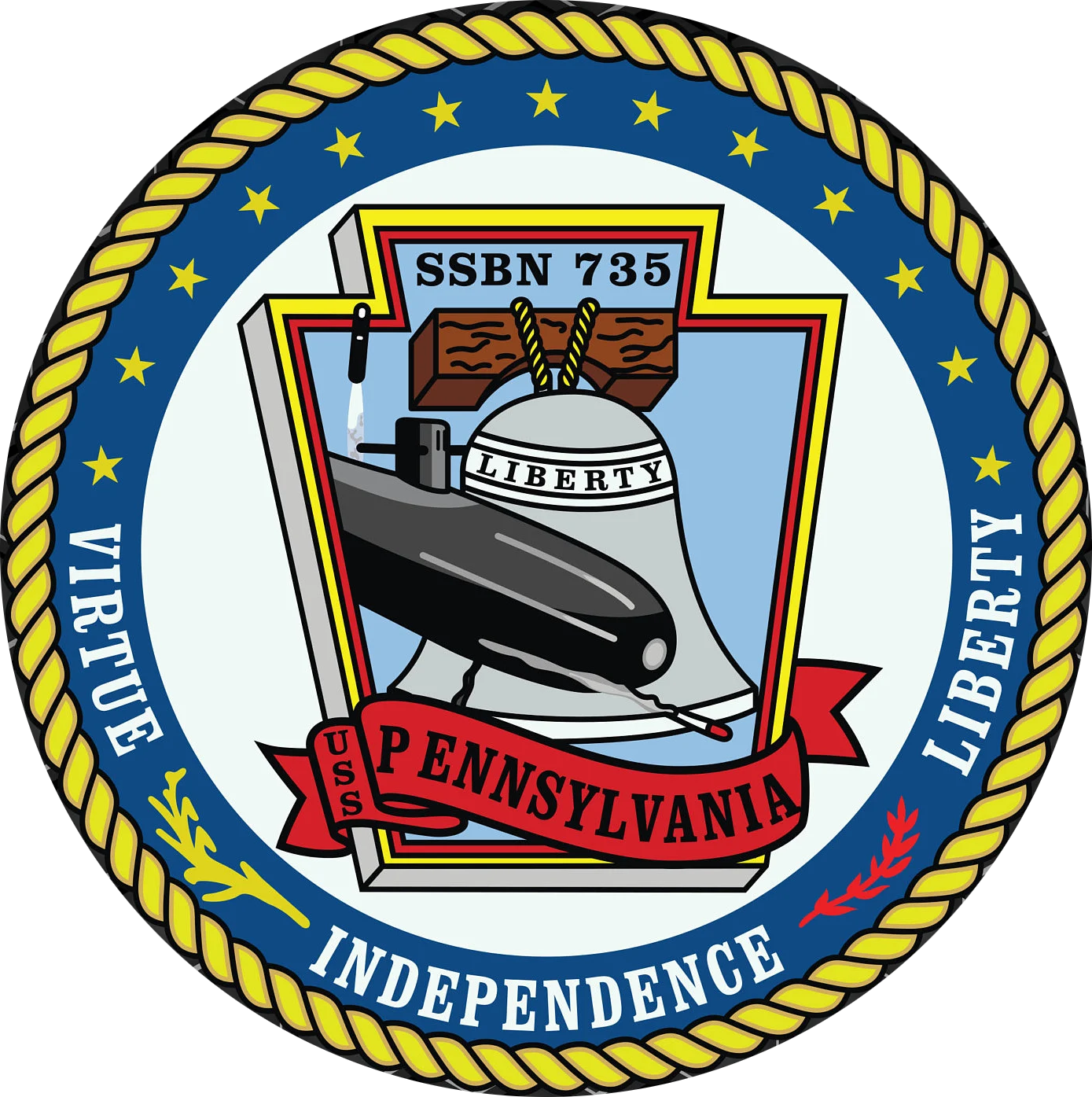
- Badge

General characteristics
- Class & type: Ohio-class ballistic missile submarine
- Displacement: 16,764 long tons (17,033 t) surfaced; 18,750 long tons (19,050 t) submerged
- Length: 562 ft (171 m)
- Beam: 42 ft (13 m)
- Draft: 38 ft (12 m)
- Propulsion: 1 × S8G PWR nuclear reactor (HEU 93.5%); 2 × geared turbines; 1 × 325 hp (242 kW) auxiliary motor; 1 × shaft @ 60,000 shp (45,000 kW)
- Speed: Greater than 25 knots (46 km/h; 29 mph)
- Test depth: Greater than 800 feet (240 m)
- Complement: 15 officers; 140 enlisted
- Armament: MK-48 torpedoes; 20 × Trident II D-5 ballistic missiles

USS Pennsylvania (hull number SSBN-735) is a nuclear-powered, United States Navy Ohio-class ballistic missile submarine that has been in commission since 1989. She is the fourth ship of the United States Navy to be named for the Commonwealth of Pennsylvania.

== Construction and commissioning ==
The contract to build Pennsylvania was awarded to the Electric Boat Division of General Dynamics Corporation in Groton, Connecticut, on 29 November 1982 and her keel was laid down there on 10 January 1984. She was launched on 23 April 1988, sponsored by Mrs. Marilyn Garrett, and commissioned on 9 September 1989.

== Service history ==
On 29 September 1989, Pennsylvania ran aground as she entered the channel during her first visit to Port Canaveral, Florida. Tugboats freed her in about two hours. A US Navy investigation determined that Pennsylvania was properly positioned in the channel, but the channel had been silted by the recent passing of Hurricane Hugo. Pennsylvania had been rerouted to Port Canaveral shortly after another submarine had struck a buoy that had repositioned in the entrance channel of Kings Bay. Still, it was thought that the channel to Port Canaveral had been unaffected. Pennsylvania received no damage. This was a rare occasion of a warship running aground and the commanding officer not being disciplined. Shortly after that, Pennsylvania departed on her first strategic deterrent patrol, which lasted 82 days.

In 2001, Pennsylvania won the Marjorie Sterrett Battleship Fund Award for the United States Atlantic Fleet.

In 2009, Pennsylvania was featured in an episode of the British television documentary series Big, Bigger, Biggest.

In 2012, Pennsylvania completed a mid-life 2 1/2-year Engineered Refueling Overhaul (ERO) at Puget Sound Naval Shipyard, where her reactor was refueled for an estimated 25 more years of service.

On 14 June 2014, Pennsylvania completed a record-setting 140-day strategic deterrent patrol. This is the longest strategic deterrent patrol completed since the beginning of the Poseidon C3 missile program in the 1970s.

On 2 October 2026, Pennsylvania arrived at its new homeport at Naval Submarine Base Kings Bay.
