= Baltimore City Detention Center =

Prison in Baltimore, Maryland, US

Coordinates: 39°18′04″N 76°36′29″W

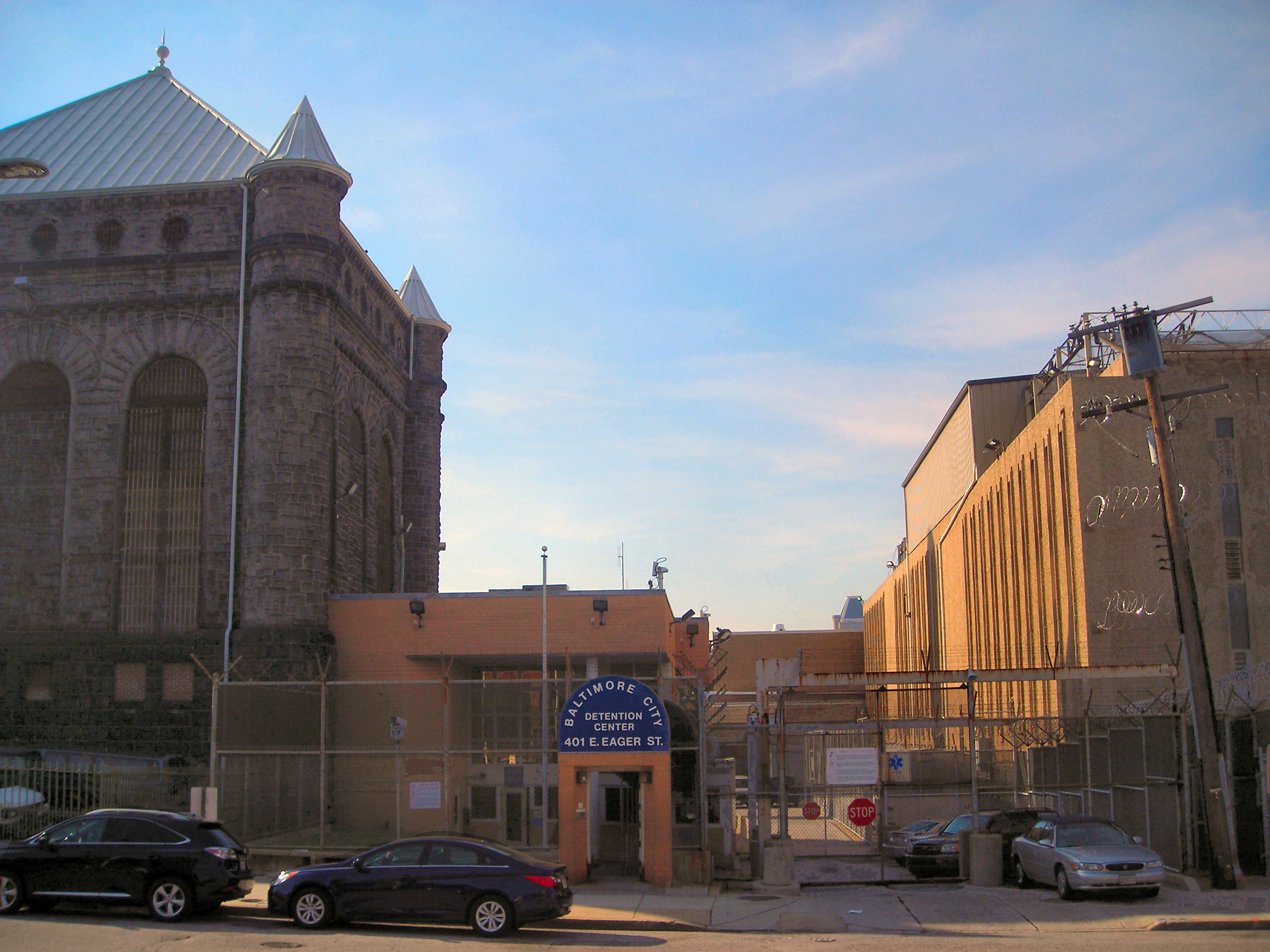
- Interactive map of Baltimore City Detention Center
- Location: 401 E. Eager Street Baltimore, Maryland
- Opened: 1801
- Managed by: Maryland Department of Public Safety and Correctional Services
- Director: Ricky Foxwell

Baltimore City Detention Center (BCDC, formerly known as the Baltimore City Jail) is a Maryland Department of Public Safety and Correctional Services state prison for men and women. It is located on 401 East Eager Street in downtown Baltimore, Maryland. It has been a state facility since July 1991.

In July 2015, Maryland governor Larry Hogan announced the men's facility would be permanently closed, and the 750 inmates redistributed among other more modern facilities. The exact date of the closure was not made known. It was demolished in 2021.

== Correctional campus ==
The Center is one element of a correctional campus that also includes:

- the Baltimore City Correctional Center at 901 Greenmount Avenue, also a state facility
- Maryland's Metropolitan Transition Center at 954 Forrest Street, first established 1811 as the Maryland Penitentiary, site of the state's (now-decommissioned) execution chamber
- the Chesapeake Detention Facility at 401 East Madison Street, formerly known as the Maryland Correctional Adjustment Center

The BCDC ranks among the top 20 largest detention facilities in the United States. With a working capacity of 4,000 prisoners, the five buildings of the BCDC also represent one of the oldest prisons in the country. About 90% of detainees are pretrial detainees.

== History and conditions ==
Baltimore's first jail was built in 1801 and was used until a new facility was built in 1859. In 1832, half the prisoners in Baltimore City Jail were imprisoned for debt; Edgar Allan Poe claimed to have been arrested for an unpaid debt shared with his brother Henry, who had died.

Architects Thomas and James M. Dixon won the contract for the 1858 re-construction. An elaborate Gothic design by Gradley J.F. Bryant had been selected by the City Commissioner without authorization, and rescinded after protest. The building was gutted and re-constructed 1859-60. Only a small part of the 1859 building remained.

The jail has a long and "checkered history" with a lengthy series of litigation over jail conditions. The Baltimore Sun was already reporting about poor conditions in the jail in 1885, and by 1938, some Baltimore City residents "were calling for the building to be demolished and replaced with a new facility." The city Criminal Justice Commission president at the time, C. Delano Ames, called the jail a "disgrace to a metropolitan city" as well as "a sanitary menace, and a breeder of degeneracy." City grand juries repeatedly recommended building a new jail; in 1940, a grand jury subcommittee recommended construction of a new jail, but stated: "the committee feels it is useless for them to lay any great stress upon this point as the recommendation has been made by every grand jury for the last 10 or 15 years without results."

In 1952, voters approved spending $6 million to build a new jail, but plans to build a new facility near City Hospital (now Johns Hopkins Bayview Medical Center) in East Baltimore attracted opposition from local residents. In 1962, the city decided to carry out an extensive renovation of the existing building instead. Initially estimated to cost $2 million, the first of three planned phases alone cost $3.8 million. The newly renovated facility could accommodate an inmate population of 1,500, including 200 female inmates. The new facility was dedicated in 1967; at the dedication ceremony, Mayor Theodore R. McKeldin said that "building a new structure is not enough. We need substantive rehabilitation programs for these men. ... They are an essential part of any crime-fighting program."

The jail continued to suffer problems, however; in 1972, the Federal Bureau of Prisons reported a "desperate lack of training among guards, lax security measures, poor sanitation and inadequate inmate rehabilitation programs" and well as poor morale among the then-273 guards. Also in 1972, black guards were promoted to captain for the first time. In 1977, four women became the first female guards to work in the men's wing of the jail.

In 1979, a federal judge ruled that only one inmate could be housed in each cell. As a result, city officials announced a five-year jail renovation and expansion project. In 1987, after a ten-year lawsuit relating to jail overcrowding, the city agreed to provide 500 new beds for inmates and to cap the jail population at 2,622. A series of efforts to reduce the jail population failed, and by 1989, the jail's population was approaching 3,000, and Mayor Kurt L. Schmoke declared an emergency.

In 1991, the state took over the facility from the city, changing its name from Baltimore City Jail to Baltimore City Detention Center.

In 2002, the United States Department of Justice Civil Rights Division determined that poor conditions at the facility "had contributed to the deaths of several detainees, some of whom received little or no medical attention for chronic health problems," and had violated inmates' constitutional rights.

In 2003, the American Civil Liberties Union filed a class action in the U.S. District Court for the District of Maryland, Duvall v. Hogan, on behalf of jail inmates, alleging that the facility's poor conditions rose to the level of unconstitutional cruel and unusual punishment. A settlement was reached in 2009. Under the terms of the settlement, the government agreed to assessment detainees' medical needs upon entry; respond to "detainees' sick call requests within 72 hours and faster in emergencies," provide "ongoing treatment for detainees with chronic diseases," provide "an on-site psychiatrist available five days a week," accommodate detainees with disabilities, and "fix broken plumbing in a timely manner."

In June 2015, the ACLU filed a motion to reopen the suit, arguing that the state had failed to meaningfully improve conditions. In its motion to reopen, ACLU attorneys wrote that BCDC was "a dank and dangerous place, where detainees are confined in dirty cells infested with vermin"; that the facility's showers "are full of drain flies, black mold and filth"; that at one point an entire section of the BCDC went without working sinks or toilets for several days, creating a "fetid and unhealthy" atmosphere "because the detainees had no way to dispose of their bodily wastes except by using the nonfunctional toilets"; and that temperatures at the jail often climb above 90 degrees Fahrenheit.

== Gang activity prosecutions ==
In 2013, following a multi-agency investigation, the U.S. Attorney's Office for the District of Maryland indicted 44 individuals, including 27 Maryland Department of Public Safety and Correctional Services correctional officers and several others, including inmates, on federal various charges of racketeering, conspiracy, distribution of drugs, and money laundering inside BCDC and several connected facilities. The government alleges that the accused were affiliated with the Black Guerrilla Family. Among other details in the indictments, one inmate, Tavon White, fathered five children with four of the female guards since 2009. Two of the guards had the inmate's name tattooed on their bodies. White also claimed to earn at least $16,000 a month from drug and other contraband smuggling.

By July 2015, forty of the 44 defendants had been convicted of crimes in the case. Twenty-four of the 27 correctional officers charged were convicted in the case, while three were acquitted. Of the 15 inmates and others, 14 were convicted and one died before the case was resolved. Among the convicted defendants was White, the Black Guerrilla Family ringleader who fathered children with four correctional officers; White pleaded guilty and was sentenced to 12 years in prison in February 2015.

== See also ==
- New Youth Detention Facility (Baltimore City)
