= Dawson murder case =

Murder of family of seven in Baltimore, Maryland, in 2002

Dawson family murder
- Location: 39.30505°N 76.59943°W; Oliver, Baltimore, Maryland, U.S.
- Date: October 16, 2002
- Target: Dawson family
- Attack type: Arson
- Weapon: Firebomb
- Deaths: 7
- Perpetrator: Darrell L. Brooks
- Motive: Retaliation for Angela Dawson reporting crime to police

The Dawson family, a family of seven (parents Carnell and Angela, and five children), were all murdered in Baltimore, Maryland, U.S., on October 16, 2002. After Angela had repeatedly alerted police to drug dealing, assault, and other crimes in her East Baltimore neighborhood of Oliver, the entire family was killed when their home was firebombed. A neighbor, Darrell L. Brooks— pleaded guilty to the crimes and was given a life sentence without the possibility of parole. Federal prosecutors initially considered seeking a death sentence, but decided against it after learning that Brooks was likely mentally disabled. At the time of the attack, Brooks was on probation but had been left unsupervised.

After repeated vandalism of their home, the Dawsons survived a first arson attempt on October 3, 2002, only to succumb to the second. The outcry over the magnitude of the crime was only matched by the frustration expressed by many residents who simply could not believe that city officials, who were aware of the escalating violence, had been unable to protect the family. City officials defended their actions, saying an offer to relocate the family was refused.

The tragedy underscored the failure in attempts to encourage residents of Baltimore to stand up to drug dealing and of the city to provide protection to those who did. In 2005, relatives of the Dawson family filed suit against the city, state and various agencies. They alleged that despite the launch of the "Believe Campaign" in 2002 (which encouraged residents to supply information about drug dealers) there were insufficient resources to protect witnesses who did come forward. The lawsuit was later dismissed, a ruling which was later upheld in an appeal to the Maryland Court of Appeals.

Numerous efforts to reclaim and rebuild Oliver in the name of the Dawson family have been undertaken by politicians, activists and ordinary citizens. Mayor (and later Governor of Maryland) Martin O'Malley, U.S. Rep. Elijah Cummings, State Senator Nathaniel McFadden and the action group known as Baltimoreans United in Leadership Development (BUILD) have worked in individual and collective ways to ensure the Dawson family a lasting public memory. The house where the Dawsons died reopened in April 2007 as the Dawson Safe Haven Community Center.
