= New Youth Detention Facility (Baltimore City) =

Coordinates: 39°17′52″N 76°37′18″W

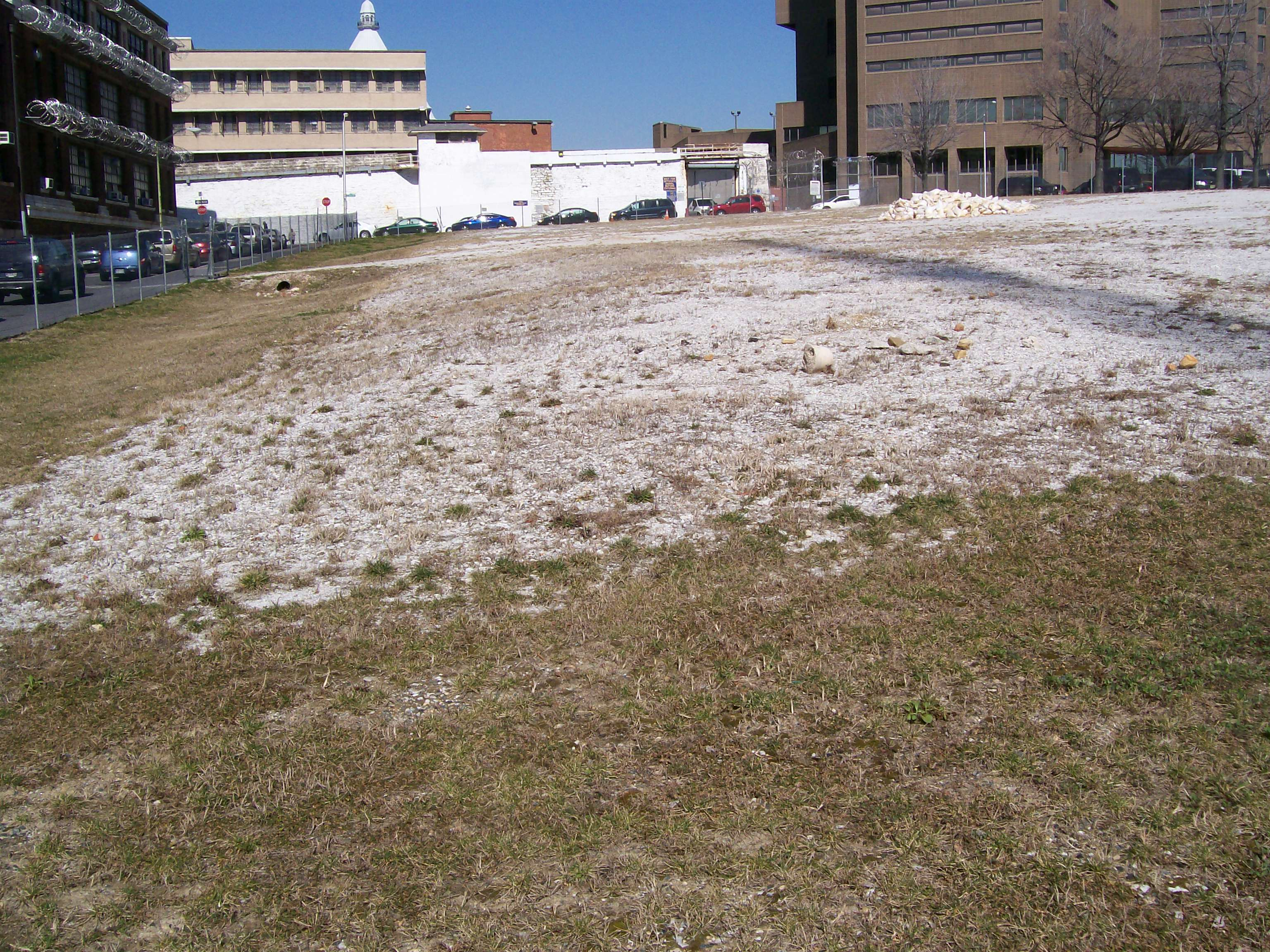
Site of the proposed jail

The New Youth Detention Facility in Baltimore City is a jail planned by the Maryland Department of Public Safety and Correctional Services (DPSCS). The facility is slated to be built between the 600 blocks of East Monument and East Madison Streets.

The jail is designed to house between 180 and 230 youth facing trial as an adult. These youth were previously incarcerated along with adults in the Baltimore City Detention Center (BCDC) but are now detained at The Baltimore City Juvenile Justice Center (BCJJC) in a separate unit. Youth charged as adults are not covered by the provisions for "Sight and Sound Separation" required by the Juvenile Justice and Delinquency Prevention Act.

== Background ==
The state of Maryland announced plans to build new facilities for children and women in 2007, amidst investigations by the US Department of Justice (DOJ) calling BCDC "deliberately indifferent" to the condition of inmates. These plans were tentative; the DOJ demanded maintenance for existing facilities, but not the creation of new ones. One of the biggest concerns, then and now, is the inadequacy of available health care. On January 18, 2008, Governor Martin O'Malley announced plan to spend $200 million constructing new juvenile detention facilities, including one in Baltimore.

Advocates of the new prison suggest that BCDC is unsafe and unhealthy for juveniles, and that the detained youth need their own building. They additionally suggest that a special youth facility would be able to focus more on rehabilitation.

The average number of juveniles housed in BCDC at any given time has declined from 92 to 47 since 2007 (a peak year).

== Project ==
In 2009, Maryland DPSCS selected Dewberry, a preeminent corrections architecture firm, to design the facility. The projected cost of construction was $99.7 million, 9.6% of which goes into design. $14 million had been spent on the project by May 2011.

Plans for the jail called for 180 beds in single-occupancy rooms. Some rooms will be divisible, making room for a total of 230 children. The building would have had a total of 229,348 square feet of floor, with 147,294 net usable square feet. Population size for the detention center is based on a projected total of 180 prisoners in the year 2025.

Plans call for six large housing segments, each of which includes activity spaces, a counseling room, and a space for police officers. The building will also have a gym, a community space, and a separate intake center. Dewberry also plans to seek LEED certification.

PSA-Dewberry, which also has a contract to build a jail for women nearby, intends for various core services to be shared among the two buildings.

== Criticism ==
A white paper released by the National Council on Crime and Delinquency contests the need for additional bed space. It cites both a decreasing youth population (−17% since 2000) and decreasing crime rates (−33% since 2000) as reasons to expect less crime from Baltimore's youth. The report also notes the existence of "reverse waivers", which allow adult courts to transfer youth to the juvenile detention system while retaining control of their case.

An alliance of community groups, education advocates, and others released a memo to state and municipal politicians, as well as to members of the public, stating several points of opposition to the plan. The memo recommends avoiding the practice of trying youth as adults entirely. It also suggests reallocating the money for the jail to schools and community recreation centers.

Jabriera Handy, for the Just Kids Partnership to End the Automatic Prosecution of Youth as Adults , editorialized in the Baltimore Sun that ending the practice of trying youth as adults would be preferable to the construction of a new jail. As a person tried as an adult when she was 17, Handy also cautions readers that youth ought not to be housed at the Baltimore City Detention Center; she suggests that perhaps a temporary facility could be found.

Pastor Heber Brown argued that the state's spending priorities reflected basic racism against Baltimore's African American residents.

== Protests ==
The new jail has been the target of ongoing demonstrations, many on the vacant lot slated for development. Groups protesting the jail include the Baltimore Algebra Project, Leaders of a Beautiful Struggle, Pleasant Hope Baptist Church, Kinetics Faith and Justice Network, Occupy Baltimore, the Safe and Sound Campaign, Critical Resistance and more.

=== Baltimore Algebra Project ===
The Baltimore Algebra Project has advocated for budget reform since 2004. In 2009 and 2010, after seeing two of its own members tried as adults, the group began to focus on specifically opposing the school-to-prison pipeline. It formed a large coalition to oppose the construction of the youth jail, which it argued would actually lead to more young people being tried as adults and imprisoned.

=== Schools not Jails ===
On January 16, 2012 opponents of the jail, including members of the recently evicted Occupy Baltimore protest, held a demonstration they called "Schools not Jails." Members of the group entered the site of the proposed jail and erected a schoolhouse, from which they taught a lesson on Frederick Douglass. State police arrested six protestors and dismantled the building.

While State Troopers arrested the protesters, city police kept away representatives from the media. Fern Shen reported for Baltimore Brew:

After the tent was gone, Det. Brown, of the the [sic] Baltimore City Police, came over and yelled at me to leave: “You’re supposed to be with the other media outside the perimeter.” Asked why the press had to leave, Brown, said, “I don’t have to tell you that, I just have to escort you over there.” He warned that I’d be subject to the same treatment “they” were, indicating the protesters but declining to say what that treatment was.

Schools not Jails continued to host events throughout the week. Participants heard from different groups, including Leaders of a Beautiful Struggle, Civilian-Soldier Alliance, and Critical Resistance. A large police presence remained at the site all week.

== Re-evaluation ==
The 2011 NCCD paper brought calls to decrease the size of the planned jail, including a Baltimore Sun editorial.

The Maryland General Assembly asked the DPSCS to produce a report on whether the number of beds at the facility could be reduced, suspending work on the project in the meantime. In December 2011, DPSCS accepted the NCCD recommendation and recommended that construction proceed for a 120-bed facility. DCPSS reconfirmed this plan in March 2012 and agreed to a $16.9 million cut in the prison's funding.

In April 2012, the Maryland House Appropriations Committee again declared the project suspended and asked DPSCS to provide another report: on whether the existing Pre-Release Unit for Women could be used as an alternative space to hold youth charged as adults.
