= Big, Bigger, Biggest =

Television series

- Genre: Documentary
- Created by: Carlo Massarella
- Narrated by: John Michie
- Theme music composer: Alasdair Reid; Rohan Stevenson
- Country of origin: United Kingdom
- Original language: English
- No. of series: 3
- No. of episodes: 20

Production
- Executive producers: Ian Duncan (Series 1 & 2) Carlo Massarella (Series 3)
- Running time: 45–50 minutes 1 hour (inc. commercials)
- Production companies: Windfall Films; SBS; Kompas TV

Original release
- Network: Five; National Geographic Channel
- Release: 1 April 2008 – 2 August 2011

Related
- Monster Moves

Big, Bigger, Biggest is a British documentary television series which began airing in 2008. A total of 20 episodes have been produced across three series.

== Format ==
Each episode explores the engineering breakthroughs that have made it possible to develop the largest structures of today. Episodes describe the landmark inventions that have enabled the engineers of today to construct the world's biggest structures, including computer generated imagery. The imagery shows the size of the object in meters, the various designs that were considered, and what might have happened if the engineers had made a mistake, complete with animated figures running in panic.

It is also available on DVD:

- Series 1 – 208 minutes - 1 DVD - PAL 16:9 Widescreen
- Series 2 – 520 minutes - 3 DVDs - PAL
- Series 3 – 270 minutes - 2 DVDs - PAL 16:9 Widescreen

== Episodes ==
Series	Episodes	Originally released (U.S. and E.U.)	
Series	Episodes	First released	Last released
1	4	1 April 2008	28 October 2008
2	10	28 July 2009	29 September 2009
3	6	5 July 2011	9 August 2011

=== Series 1 (2008) ===
No.	Title	Original (Five) air date	Alt air date	SBS air date
1	"Skyscraper"	1 April 2008	1 April 2008	27 November 2010
This episode looks at the history of skyscraper breakthroughs, culminating in the construction of the 828-metre (2,717 ft) tall Burj Dubai (now Burj Khalifa). The other buildings discussed are the Equitable Life Building, the Flatiron Building, the United Nations Headquarters, the original World Trade Center towers, the Sears Tower and Taipei 101.
2	"Aircraft Carrier"	15 April 2008	15 April 2008	20 November 2010
One of the largest warships in the world, USS Nimitz (CVN-68), would not have been possible if it weren't for seven landmark inventions. The other aircraft carriers discussed were USS North Carolina, HMS Ark Royal, USS Hornet, USS Midway, USS Forrestal and USS Enterprise.
3	"Bridge"	8 April 2008	17 April 2008	6 November 2010
This episode reveals how several suspension bridge breakthroughs (The Iron Bridge, Menai Bridge, Niagara Bridge, Brooklyn Bridge, Golden Gate Bridge and Verrazzano–Narrows Bridge) made it possible to construct the 2-mile (3.2 km) long Akashi Kaikyō Bridge.
4	"Airport"	25 March 2008	28 October 2008	13 November 2010
Heathrow Airport is the busiest international airport in the world. This episode follows the construction of Terminal 5, an additional terminal to cater for an additional 30 million passengers, and contributions of its forerunners - Croydon, Gatwick, Chicago O'Hare, Dallas Love Field, Atlanta International (actually the busiest international airport in the world) and Los Angeles International.

=== Series 2 (2009) ===
No.	Title	Original release date	SBS air date
1	"Tunnel"	28 July 2009	15 January 2011
The world's longest tunnel at 57 kilometres (35 mi) in length is the Gotthard Base Tunnel in the Swiss Alps. The episode lists Thames Tunnel, Box Tunnel, Mersey Railway Tunnel, Simplon Tunnel and Channel Tunnel as its predecessors.
2	"Submarine"	4 August 2009	4 December 2010
The biggest submarine in the U.S. Navy is the USS Pennsylvania (SSBN-735) at 171 metres (561 ft) in length. Her predecessors explored in the episode are Turtle, H. L. Hunley, U-66, USS Nautilus (SSN-571) and USS George Washington (SSBN-598).
3	"Aircraft"	11 August 2009	29 January 2011
The Antonov An-124 is one of the largest aircraft in the world with the ability to carry 50 family-sized cars. The episode also discusses Sikorsky Ilya Muromets, Junkers G.38, Boeing Clipper, Messerschmitt Gigant and Lockheed C-5 Galaxy.
4	"Oil Rig"	18 August 2009	5 February 2011
The Perdido oil platform is located in an area of water that is 2 kilometres (1.2 mi) deep. From first offshore drilling at Grand Lake through Grand Isle platform and Beryl Alpha platform to Cognac platform and Auger, the episode follows the evolution of oil-drilling platforms.
5	"Ferris Wheel"	25 August 2009	19 February 2011
The tallest Ferris wheel in the world was the Singapore Flyer (at the time of this airing), standing 165 metres (541 ft) high. From the original Ferris Wheel, followed by Earls Court Gigantic, London Eye and Star of Nanchang, the episode explores technical breakthroughs related to growth of Ferris wheels.
6	"Space Station"	1 September 2009	18 December 2010
This episode reveals the technological inventions – Salyut 1, Skylab, Apollo–Soyuz, Mir – that made the construction of the International Space Station possible.
7	"Dam"	8 September 2009	11 December 2010
The world's first hydroelectric power station, Debdon Dam, followed by Marèges Dam, Hoover Dam, Grand Coulee Dam and Krasnoyarsk Dam, led to construction of the largest hydroelectric dam – the Three Gorges Dam in China.
8	"Cruise Liner"	15 September 2009	8 January 2011
Independence of the Seas is a 160,000-metric-ton (160,000-long-ton; 180,000-short-ton) cruise liner, succeeding the Great Western, Great Britain, Conte di Savoia, Normadie and Queen Mary.
9	"Dome"	22 September 2009	12 February 2011
The dome roof evolution is explored via Pantheon, Florence Cathedral, West Baden Hotel, Astrodome, Georgia Dome and the Ōita Stadium.
10	"Telescope"	29 September 2009	22 January 2011
The Large Binocular Telescope would not have been possible if it weren't for a variety of breakthroughs in the construction of telescope: Newton's reflector, Parsons' telescope, Hooker telescope, Hale Telescope and Bolshoi telescope.

=== Series 3 (2011) ===
No.	Title	Original release date
1	"Canal"	5 July 2011
Features the Panama Canal expansion project. Explores the technological development of canals including the Briare Canal, Bridgewater Canal and Manchester Ship Canal
2	"Icebreaker"	12 July 2011
Starting from Eisbrecher I, through Lenin and Polarstern to building the Timofey Guzhenko.
3	"Metro"	19 July 2011
From City and South London Railway to New York City Subway, Paris Métro and finally London Underground again.
4	"Prison"	26 July 2011
From Tower of London to Eastern State Penitentiary, Alcatraz and building the most advanced prison in the USA - the North Branch Correctional Institution
5	"Tower"	2 August 2011
Washington Monument, Eiffel Tower and CN Tower made possible building of Canton Tower, the world's tallest tower (currently 2nd tallest).
6	"Train"	9 August 2011
From Rocket and Mallard to Shinkansen and building the fastest wheeled train, the SNCF TGV
