= Patuxent Institution =

Correctional institution in Jessup, Maryland, United States

Coordinates: 39°9′50.73″N 76°46′43.42″W

- Interactive map of Patuxent Institution
- Location: Jessup, Maryland
- Status: open
- Security class: maximum
- Capacity: 987
- Opened: 1955
- Managed by: Maryland Department of Public Safety and Correctional Services

The Patuxent Institution is located in Jessup, Maryland one mile east of U.S. Route 1 on Maryland Route 175. It is a treatment-oriented maximum-security correctional facility. With a maximum static capacity of 987 beds, it offers the most diverse services to the most varied male and female offender population in the state, and possibly in the nation. Patuxent Institution is the only institution for sentenced criminals in Maryland that is not part of the Maryland Department of Public Safety and Correctional Services. Its foundation lies in the Maryland Public General Law, codified as Title 4 of the Correctional Services Article. The predecessor of this statute, Article 31B of the Public General Laws of Maryland, was enacted in 1951.

== History ==
Patuxent Institution began operations in 1955, a unique facility created to house Maryland's most dangerous criminal offenders. Its mission was to ensure public safety through the psychotherapeutic treatment of "defective delinquents." These were offenders who demonstrated persistent antisocial and criminal behavior, and who were designated by the court to be involuntarily committed to Patuxent Institution under an indeterminate sentence. From its inception, Patuxent Institution was specifically designed to be a self-contained operation that was staffed by full-time clinicians, including psychologists, social workers and psychiatrists, as well as by custody personnel. Patuxent Institution was also unique in that it was provided with its own admission, inmate review, and paroling authority separate from that of the Maryland Division of Correction (DOC). Thus, once designated as a defective delinquent, an offender was to be released from Patuxent only upon the findings of the court that the inmate's release was for the "[inmate's] benefit and the benefit of society..."

A gubernatorial commission was formed in 1977 to review Patuxent Institution's functioning, as well as the laws governing it. This review resulted in Article 31B being rewritten. The Defective Delinquent Law and indeterminate sentencing were abolished, and on July 1, 1977, the Eligible Persons, or "EP" Program came into existence. In 1987, fueled by a consent decree resulting from the court case of Brown, et al. vs. Gluckstern, another significant institutional change was implemented. The EP program, which initially served only male offenders, was expanded by this decree to include female offenders, as well. In 1990, the 109-bed Patuxent Institution for Women (PIW) opened on the grounds of the institution.

In 1992, the Correctional Mental Health Center — Jessup (CMHC-J) was established within Patuxent Institution to provide a more effectively coordinated and centralized treatment environment specifically tailored to the needs of an increasing number of inmates with serious mental illness. This 192-bed mental health unit consolidated services for DOC inmates throughout the state who were suffering from serious psychiatric disorders.

In 1994, Patuxent Institution shifted the approach of its core treatment program in response to the swelling numbers of young offenders entering the correctional system. The new approach, which targeted the needs of youthful offenders rather than those of the older more chronic offenders, was conceptualized as "remediation" rather than rehabilitation. Remediation identifies and treats an inmate's particular deficits, as opposed to trying to effect change in their overall personality. In order to implement the remediation approach, the treatment staff was reorganized into smaller, more flexible units called Remediation Management Teams (RMT's). As well, treatment modules (such as Social Skills, Moral Problem Solving, and Relapse Prevention), as well as specialized programs (such as the Patuxent Drug Recovery Program, and the Sexual Offender Treatment Module), were introduced to broaden and enhance the traditional group therapy model.

The Regimented Offender Treatment Center (ROTC) was also implemented in 1994 as a cooperative effort with the Maryland Division of Parole and Probation. Now privatized, the program delivers a four-month treatment cycle to male and female inmates with significant substance abuse histories who are preparing for parole or mandatory release.

In 2000, the Mental Health Transition Unit, which was designed to augment the CMHC-J, was established at Patuxent Institution. This unit provides evaluation and support to inmates referred from DOC institutions who have mental health histories and who are scheduled for release to the community. A Step-Down Mental Health Unit, which is currently consolidated under the CMHC-J umbrella, was also developed in 2000 to serve inmates who have histories of positive response to mental health treatment, but who decompensate when returned to their "home" DOC institutions. The unit was specifically designed to provide those mentally ill inmates with the support necessary to prepare for an eventual lasting return to their "home" institution's general population.

In March 2004, Patuxent Institution also developed a new six-week program for men located within Patuxent, and for women located within the Maryland Correctional Institution for Women, but managed by Patuxent Institution. The Substance Abuse Transition Program (SATP) is a correctional "time-out" designed to provide both relapse prevention and transitional planning modules to technical parole violators who have a modest substance abuse problem.

== Board of Review ==
One of the unique functions accorded Patuxent Institution at its inception by the Maryland Legislature, is having its own independent paroling authority. Known as the Institutional Board of Review, this body also annually reviews offenders' progress in the EP and Patuxent Youth Programs, and may grant, deny, or revoke conditional release status to offenders in these programs. It may find offenders ineligible for a treatment program, or may recommend that the sentencing court release an offender from the remainder of a sentence.

In 1982, as a response to changing needs within corrections, the legislature modified a number of aspects of the Board of Review's authority. Specifically related to paroling offenders serving a Life sentence, these modifications allowed the Board of Review to:

• Approve parole for an offender serving a life sentence if the offender's crime was committed prior to July 1, 1982.

• Recommend parole for an offender serving a life sentence. However, the parole must be approved by both the Governor and the Secretary of Public Safety and Correctional Services.

• Offenders serving a life sentence may be considered for parole after completion of 15 years of the court-imposed sentence. Additional requirements for an individual with a life sentence to be considered for parole include successful completion of two years of work release, a favorable clinical review conference, a recommendation from the RMT, and the support of the Institutional Board of Review for referral to the governor.

• Inmates serving a "split-life" sentence may be eligible for parole consideration upon completion of 50% of the term imposed by the court. As with individuals serving life sentences, completion of two years of work release, a favorable clinical review conference, a recommendation from the RMT, and the support of the Institutional Board of Review for referral to the Governor.

• The Board of Review can also approve parole for offenders serving a non-life sentence. If the offender's crime was committed on or before March 20, 1989, the Board of Review can act autonomously. If the crime was committed on or after March 20, 1989, the Board of Review can recommend parole but must have the approval of the Secretary of Public Safety and Correctional Services. Subsequent to a revision of and amendment to the law in March 1989, approval by seven of the nine Board of Review members is also required for an offender to be granted any type of conditional release status including day leaves, work/school release, and parole.

== Community Re-Entry Facility ==
The Community Re-Entry Facility (REF) is managed by an RMT that provides supervision and treatment services to male work/school release offenders who reside in the facility. They also provide services to parolees who live independently in the community, and who report to the REF for supervision. Female Work/School release offenders continue to reside in and receive services from Patuxent Institution. Female parolees also come to the institution for supervision.

The REF staff provides a wide range of services to the residents and parolees it supervises. These services include individualized therapy, weekly status supervision meetings, group therapy, and assistance in finding employment. Offenders are strictly monitored for use of illicit drugs or alcohol.

As the offender progresses through the various stages of the pre-release and parole program, he or she is expected to demonstrate an increased level of personal responsibility with decreasing reliance on external support. When the RMT recommends an offender for Community Parole, the REF is confident that the offender has mastered social skills adequate for crime-free, productive community living.

== Parole revocation ==
Whenever the REF staff has reason to believe that a parolee has violated condition(s) of his/her parole contract, or has violated a law, that parolee is returned to the institution. The parolee is brought before a hearing officer for a preliminary parole revocation hearing within 72 hours of his/her return.

The parolee is detained at Patuxent Institution to await a formal parole revocation hearing before the Board of Review, if the hearing officer determines there is probable cause. At that formal parole revocation hearing, the Board of Review determines whether or not the offender's parole status should be revoked. In cases where the hearing officer determines that probable cause does not exist to retain the parolee at Patuxent Institution, the parolee is permitted to return to the REF or the community.
