= Crasus Dome Oita =

Sports venue in Oita Prefecture, Japan

Crasus Dome Ōita
- Big Eye
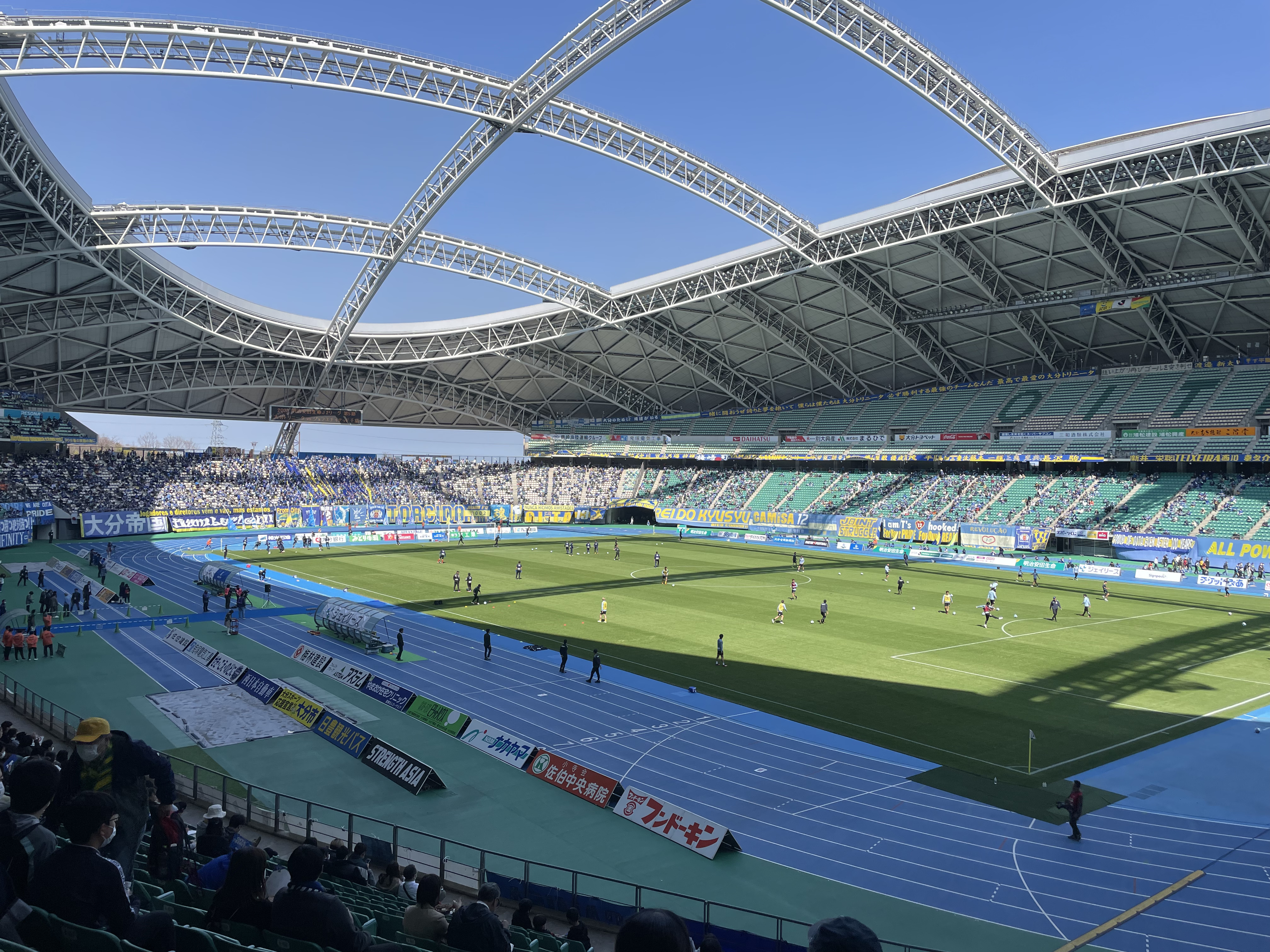
- Interactive map of Crasus Dome Ōita
- Former names: Oita Stadium (2001–2006); Kyushu Oil Dome (2006–2010); Oita Bank Dome (2010–2019); Showa Denko Dome Oita (2020–2022), Resonac Dome Oita (2023-2024)
- Location: 1351 Yokoo, Ōita City, Ōita Prefecture
- Coordinates: 33°12′2″N 131°39′27″E
- Owner: Ōita Prefecture
- Operator: Resonac Holdings Co., Ltd.
- Capacity: 40,000 (former 3,000 movable seats were removed)
- Surface: Grass
- Field size: 105 x 68 m

Construction
- Groundbreaking: 1998
- Opened: March 2001
- Cost: ¥25 billion
- Architects: Kisho Kurokawa Architect & Associates, Takenaka Corporation, SATO BENEC, and Takayama Sogo Kogyo
- General contractors: Takenaka Corporation, SATO BENEC, and Takayama Sogo Kogyo

Tenants
- Oita Trinita (2001–present); 2002 FIFA World Cup; 2019 Rugby World Cup; National Sports Festival of Japan (2008); Inter-High School Championships (2013); Japan national football team

Crasus Dome Ōita is a retractable roof, multi-purpose stadium in the city of Ōita in Ōita Prefecture on Kyushu Island in Japan.

== History ==
The stadium was built for Ōita Prefecture, which still owns it. Design was led by the famous architect Kisho Kurokawa and his firm Kisho Kurokawa Architect & Associates, and construction was carried out by a construction group led by the Takenaka Corporation. The stadium opened as Oita Stadium in May 2001.

The stadium originally had a capacity of 43,000. After the 2002 FIFA World Cup, 3,000 movable seats on the track were removed, giving the stadium its current capacity of 40,000.

In 2006 it was renamed Kyushu Oil Dome (九州石油ドーム, Kyūshū Sekiyu Dōmu), as a result of a sponsorship deal with Kyushu Oil. In early 2010, the stadium was renamed Õita Bank Dome (大分銀行ドーム, Ōita Ginkō Dōmu) when sponsorship shifted to Oita Bank. In early 2019, the stadium was renamed Showa Denko Dome Oita (昭和電工ドーム大分) after Showa Denko acquired naming rights. On 1 January 2023 Showa Denko merged with another company, forming Resonac Holdings Corporation.

Since January 2025, as a result of a sponsorship deal with Crasus Chemical Co., Ltd (a subsidiary of Resonac) the stadium is now called Crasus Dome Oita.

The stadium is primarily used for football and is the home field of J.League club Ōita Trinita.

== Features ==
Crasus Dome Oita has a retractable dome roof, which uses a wire traction system.

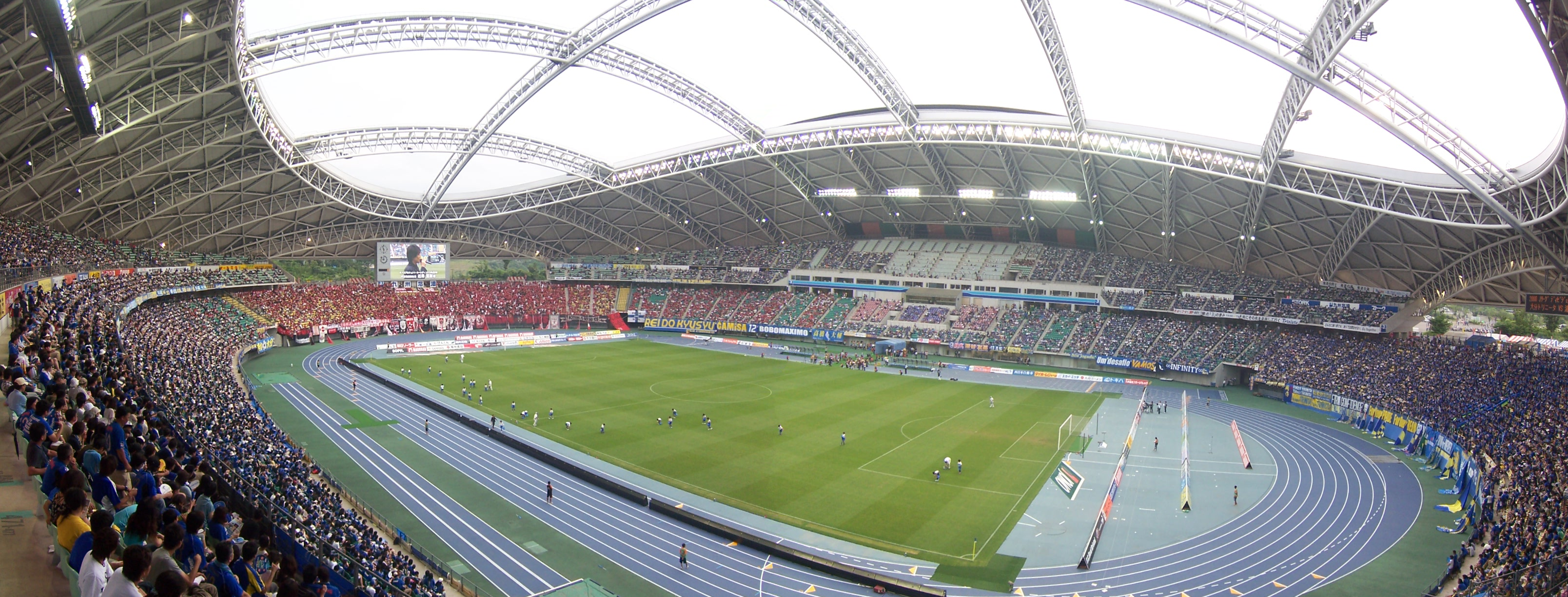
The stadium during a J-League Division 1 game between Ōita Trinita and the Urawa Red Diamonds.

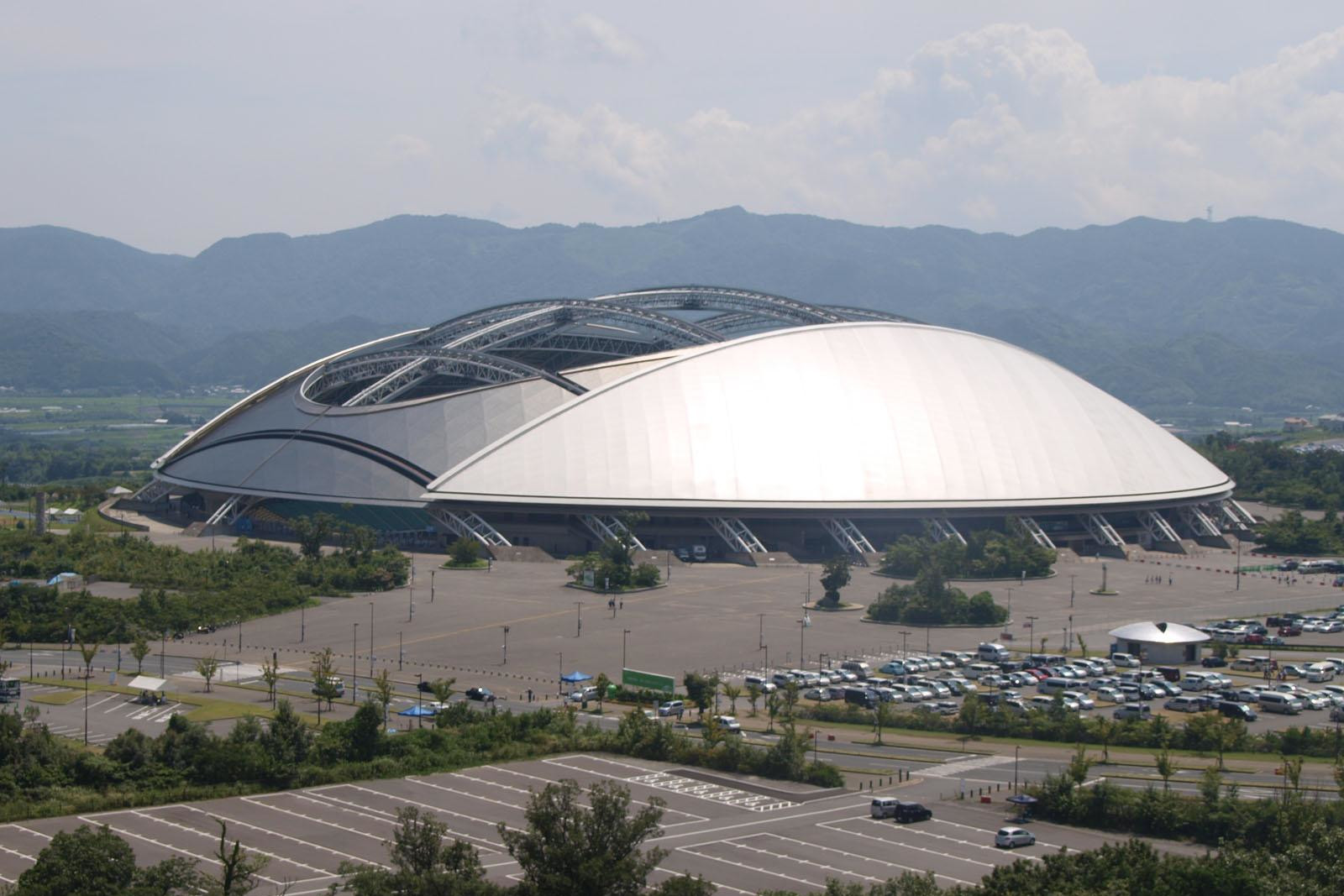
The Crasus Dome Ōita, then the Kyushu Oil Dome, in 2009.

Other features of the stadium:

- Building area: 51,830 m^{2} (557,900 sq ft)
- Total floor area: 92,882 m^{2} (999,770 sq ft)
- Covered area: 29,000 m^{2} (310,000 sq ft)
- Stand inclination: max. 33 degree angle

== Major sports matches ==
=== 2002 FIFA World Cup ===
Date	Team #1	Result	Team #2	Round	Attendance
June 10, 2002	Tunisia	1–1	Belgium	Group H	39,700
June 13, 2002	Mexico	1–1	Italy	Group G	39,291
June 16, 2002	Sweden	1–2 (asdet)	Senegal	Round of 16	39,747

=== 2019 Rugby World Cup ===
Date	Time (JST)	Team #1	Result	Team #2	Round	Attendance
October 2, 2019	19:15	New Zealand	63–0	Canada	Pool B	34,411
October 5, 2019	14:15	Australia	45–10	Uruguay	Pool D	33,781
October 9, 2019	18:45	Wales	29-17	Fiji	Pool D	33,379
October 19, 2019	16:15	England	40-16	Australia	Quarterfinals	36,954
October 20, 2019	16:15	Wales	20-19	France	Quarterfinals	34,426

== See also ==
- Sapporo Dome in Sapporo, Hokkaido Prefecture
- Noevir Stadium Kobe in Kobe, Hyōgo Prefecture
- Big, Bigger, Biggest - documentary TV series, features the stadium in episode 9 of series 2
- List of stadiums in Japan
- Lists of stadiums
