= Malik Samartaney =

American serial killer

- Malik in 2019
- Born: Lawrence Banks; June 7, 1953 (age 73); Maryland, U.S.
- Convictions: Second degree murder (3 counts); Assault with intent to disfigure Second degree assault Unauthorized disposal of a body Possession of a regulated firearm by a person convicted of a disqualifying crime Illegal possession of ammunition
- Penalty: 15 years imprisonment (1975 assault); 20 years imprisonment (1991 murders); 41 years imprisonment (2019 murder)

Details
- Victims: 3–6
- Span of crimes: 1991 – 2019 (also suspected of murdering his wife in 1976)
- Country: United States
- State: Maryland
- Imprisoned at: Roxbury Correctional Institution

Malik Samartaney (born Lawrence Banks; June 7, 1953) is an American serial killer who killed at least three people, including his son and daughter, in Maryland, between 1991 and 2019. He is also suspected of killing his wife in 1976, and his girlfriend's daughter and granddaughter in 2006. A pre-sentencing report in 1976 described Samartaney as a smooth liar and a smooth talker, and skilled at misrepresenting himself.

== Crimes ==
On July 3, 1975, Lawrence held a knife to the throat of his wife, Vivian Banks, and dragged her through the house. Although Vivian told the police that her husband had threatened to kill her, the charges were later dropped on her request.

On December 27, 1975, after an argument with his wife, Lawrence threw his seven-month-old daughter, Dominique, through a glass door. The baby had to receive 22 stitches. Lawrence was charged with assault with intent to disfigure. While out on bail, Vivian was found dead in the closet of the apartment where she had been living. Detectives suspected Lawrence of killing her, but he avoided murder charges since the body had been decomposing for several weeks and a cause of death could not be determined.

In 1976, Lawrence was convicted of the assault of his daughter in a bench trial and sentenced to 15 years in prison. At his trial, he had claimed that he was cradling the baby in one arm and accidentally broke the pane with his shoulder and the infant's head while pushing the door closed. He was released from prison in December 1988.

In the fall of 1991, Dominique and her brother, 17-year-old Lawrence Jr., accused their father of beating them. Dominique also said he had raped her while he was drunk.

On November 19, 1991, Lawrence fatally shot one of his drinking buddies, 36-year-old Michael Chisholm. Hours later, he fatally shot Lawrence Jr. as he cowered in a kitchen corner in a foster home. Due to problems with witnesses and evidence, he was allowed to plead no contest to one count of second degree murder in the murder of Lawrence Jr. and plead guilty to another count of second degree murder for killing Chisholm. Prosecutors in the Lawrence Jr. murder case said they were horrified by the agreement in the Chisholm case, having thought that it would go to trial. Lawrence received two concurrent 20-year sentences and was released from prison in October 2002.

In 2004, Lawrence, who had changed his name to Malik Samartaney, was charged with assaulting his second wife, Patricia. She said he had choked her and threatened to kill her. Malik spent nine months in jail awaiting trial before being acquitted.

On December 1, 2006, Malik's new girlfriend's daughter, 22-year-old Lisa Brown, received a protective order against him after an argument over money that he borrowed from her, in which he threw it at her. Eleven days later, Lisa and her nine month old daughter, Labria Fogle, were found shot dead in their home. Malik was suspected of killing them, but never charged due to a lack of evidence. However, in 2007, he returned to prison after having his parole revoked for not reporting that he had moved and allegedly slapping a woman. A parole commissioner described Malik's criminal history as "horrendous."

Malik served out the rest of his sentence and was released from prison in 2014.

In March 2019, Malik was charged with second degree assault, under unclear circumstances. In May 2019, Malik killed Dominique, now 43 and a mother of six. The two had started to reconnect only a few months earlier. Her remains were found in a shopping cart stuffed with black trash bags. Police only found Dominique's shoulders and arms. Her hands, feet, legs, and head are still missing.

In June 2019, Malik was arrested for illegally possessing a firearm and ammunition after police found a handgun in a trashcan inside his apartment. The police also found blood, computers, cellphones, counterfeit money, a pair of boots, a yellow raincoat and a handgun with five bullets in the magazines.

The following month, Malik was charged with first degree murder in the death of Dominique Foster. According to one of Dominique's daughters, Brittany Dunn, Malik was disgusted by her drug addiction. During a nine-minute rant over the phone, he told her that he did not want his daughter "kissing his goddamn grandchildren" and that "she's lucky I don't have a fucking pistol." Dominique had been trying to recover from her addiction and was in and out of treatment centers. Dunn said her mother left one treatment center since Malik was harassing her. Malik's ex-fiancée testified that she did not see him for about 11 hours on the day Dominique was killed. Valerie McClain said he returned to spend the night with scratches on his arms and neck. He told her the injuries were burns from antifreeze when the radiator of his van overheated. "I was upset because I didn't know where it came from," she testified.

Malik's attorneys argued that Dominique was a victim of Baltimore's drug trade and had potentially been murdered by MS-13 gang members. A neighbor reported seeing Latino men around the dumpster where her body was found. Attorney Brandon Taylor questioned police whether graffiti on the dumpster might be a gang sign.

In October 2021, Malik was convicted of second degree murder and unauthorized disposal of a body. He was acquitted of first degree murder.

Malik's sentencing hearing was held on February 28, 2022. He told judge Jennifer Schiffer that he was involved in his son's death years ago and promised God he would not kill again. "I have fruit flies in my cell and don't even swat at them," he said. Growing louder as he spoke, he talked about his time in prison and asked for leniency. "Your honor, I'm very sorry for the death of my daughter, but I did not do that. I dream every night that I find the person who would do that." His lawyer maintained that her client was innocent and had been convicted with circumstantial evidence. She highlighted Malik's military history and said he helped his daughter get drug treatment.

Dominique's daughter and sister wrote victim impact statements, calling her a loving mother, grandmother, and sister. "My mother was the most beautiful person I knew, inside and out," wrote her daughter, noting that her mother missed graduations and the births of new grandchildren. "Your honor, I'm asking for the longest sentence possible. I ask this not for revenge but for everyone's safety." Schiffer sentenced Malik to the statutory maximum of 41 years in prison, pointing to his history of violence. "This court must defend the public," Schiffer said. Under Maryland law, Malik must serve half of his sentence before he is eligible for parole.

In October 2022, Malik was convicted in his illegal weapon possession case and sentenced to 15 years in prison, with a concurrent 1-year sentence for illegally possessing ammunition. In July 2023, he pleaded guilty in his March 2019 assault case and was sentenced to 67 days in jail.

== See also ==
- List of serial killers in the United States
