= Maryland Correctional Institution - Jessup =

Correctional institution in Jessup, Maryland, US

Coordinates: 39°08′03″N 76°46′23″W

- Interactive map of Maryland Correctional Institution - Jessup
- Location: 7931 Brock Bridge Road Jessup, Maryland
- Status: open
- Security class: medium
- Capacity: 1068
- Opened: 1981
- Managed by: Maryland Department of Public Safety and Correctional Services

The Maryland Correctional Institution - Jessup is a medium security state prison for men located in Jessup, Anne Arundel County, Maryland. It opened in 1981, first as an Annex to the state House of Correction and then as a separate facility, and holds a maximum of 1068 male inmates at medium security.

The facility is immediately across the street from Jessup Correctional Institution (JCI) and Dorsey Run Correctional Facility (DRCF)

On September 29, 2025, Maryland Governor Wes Moore announced plans to close the prison. Public safety and corrections secretary, Carolyn J. Scruggs, estimated that the facility would need $200 million in renovations to bring it up to standards and that its closure would save the state $21 million a year in operational costs.
