= National Great Blacks In Wax Museum =

Museum in Baltimore, Maryland

- Taking You Through the Pages of Time

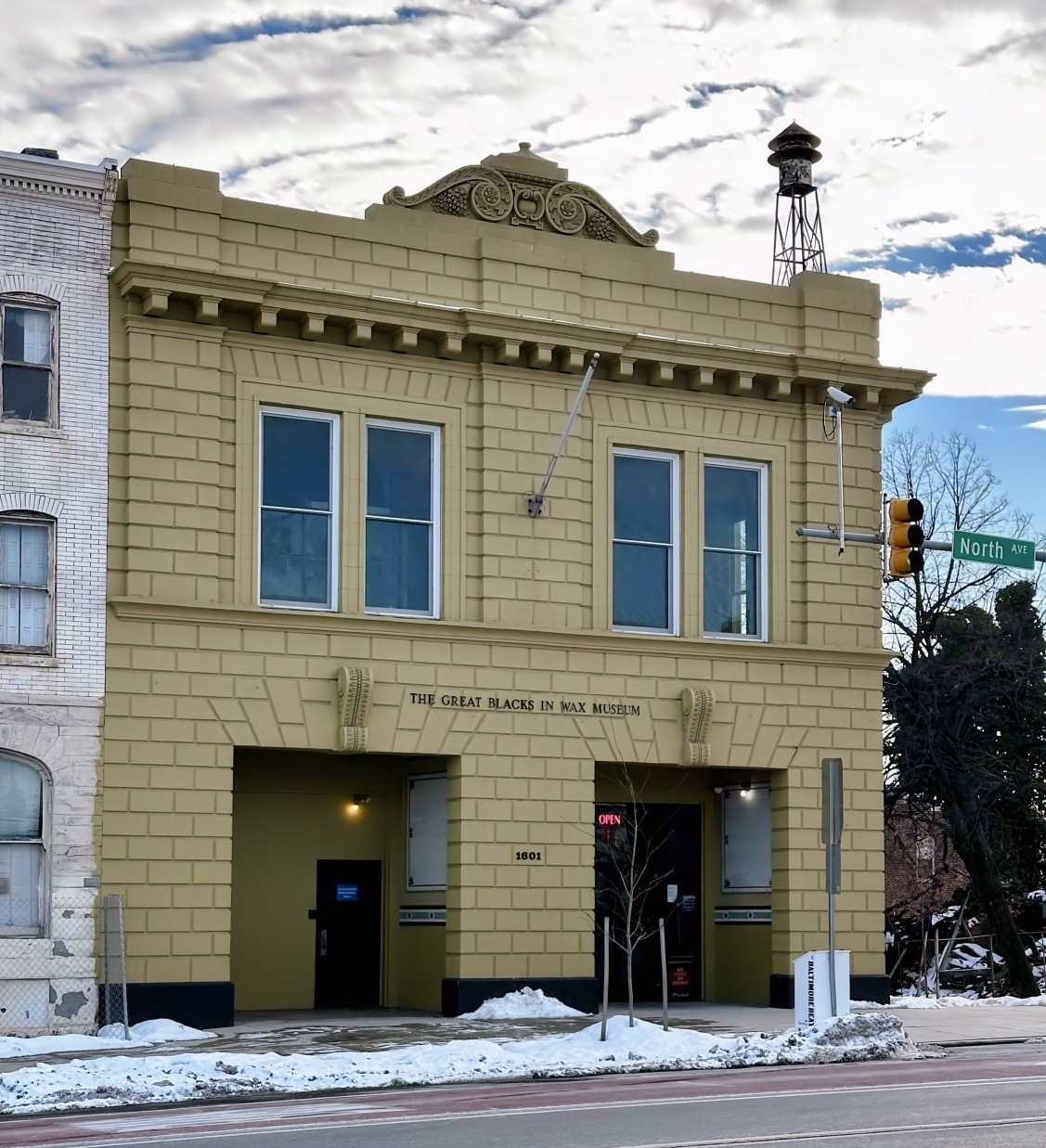
- Museum building in former firehouse

- Location within Baltimore Location within Maryland Location within the United States
- Established: 1983
- Location: 1601-03 East North Avenue; Baltimore, Maryland 21213
- Coordinates: 39°18′43″N 76°35′49″W
- Type: African-American, wax museum
- Collections: Africa to Americas, Leaders & Inventors, The Violence of Lynching, Traveling Exhibits
- Founders: Dr. Elmer Martin & Dr. Joanne Martin
- Website: www.greatblacksinwax.org

The National Great Blacks in Wax Museum is a wax museum in Baltimore, Maryland, featuring prominent African-American and other Black historical figures. It was established in 1983, in a downtown storefront on Saratoga Street. The museum is at 1601 East North Avenue in a renovated firehouse, a Victorian mansion, and two former apartment dwellings that provide nearly 30,000 square feet (3,000 m^{2}) of exhibit and office space. The exhibits feature over 100 wax figures and scenes, including: a full model slave ship exhibit which portrays the 400-year history of the Atlantic Slave Trade, an exhibit on the role of youth in making history, and a Maryland room highlighting the contributions to African American history by notable Marylanders. The museum's co-founder, Dr. Joanne Martin, describes the importance of preserving Black history in this way, stating: "Everything else, it seems like a movie if you don't have a sense of exactly what people were fighting against."

== History ==
The National Great Blacks in Wax museum is Baltimore's first wax museum and the first wax museum of African American history in the nation. The museum was started as a grassroots operation by Dr. Joanne Martin and her husband, Dr. Elmer Martin.

The idea of Blacks in wax started with a few wax figures that were taken around to various schools, community centers, and malls. The museum was originally sponsored exclusively by Dr. Elmer Martin, his wife Dr. Joanne Martin, and donations from the community. In the early days, Dr. Elmer Martin was forced to ask his wife to sell her wedding ring to keep the moving exhibit going. However, it received national recognition in 1983 when the founding members were allotted grants, loans, and endowments to open a permanent exhibition. In 1988, Blacks in Wax received its permanent home on the 1600 block of North Avenue in the neighborhood of Oliver.

The site was originally constructed in 1895 as Engine House No. 19 for the Baltimore City Fire Department. The museum converted the firehouse into a museum. In 2004, The Blacks in Wax Museum was recognized by the U.S. Congress as the "Nation's first wax museum presenting the history of great Black Americans" and subsequently became The National Blacks in Wax Museum.

== People featured in museum ==
The following people have been depicted at the museum:

- Akhenaton
- Bishop Richard Allen
- Willard Allen
- Askia the Great
- Benjamin Banneker
- Ota Benga
- Bilal
- Rev. Andrew Bryan
- Henry "Box" Brown
- John Brown
- Cripple Caesar
- Bessie Coleman
- General Benjamin O. Davis
- W. E. B. Du Bois
- Harlow Fullwood
- Thomas Garrett
- Jocko Graves
- Jackie Robinson
- Joe Louis
- Jesse Owens
- Prince Hall
- Hannibal
- General Daniel "Chappie" James
- Toussaint L'Ouverture
- Mother Mary E. Lange
- Reginald F. Lewis
- Makeda, Queen of Sheba
- Queen Anne Nzinga
- Osborne Payne
- General Colin Powell
- Howard Rollins
- Robert Samuel
- Emmett Till
- Harriet Tubman
- Nat Turner
- Madam C.J. Walker
- Carter G. Woodson
- Malcolm X
- Martin Luther King Jr.
- Marcus Garvey
- Daymond John
- Barack Obama
- Imhotep
- Elijah Muhammad
- Noble Drew Ali
- Bob Marley
- Frederick Douglass
- Rosa Parks
- George Washington Carver
- Ida B. Wells
- Nelson Mandela
- Winnie Madikizela-Mandela
- Steve Biko
- Sojourner Truth
- Hayes Turner
- Mary Turner

== See also ==
- African Americans in Baltimore
- List of museums focused on African Americans

== Sources ==
- Wood, M. (2009), 'Slavery, Memory, and Museum Display in Baltimore: The Great Blacks in Wax and the Reginald F. Lewis. Curator: The Museum Journal, 52: 147–167. 2001.
