= Anthony Grandison =

American drug dealer and murderer (born 1953)

- Born: January 6, 1953 (age 73)
- Conviction: First degree murder (2 counts)
- Penalty: Death; commuted to life imprisonment

Details
- Victims: David Scott Piechowicz; Susan Kennedy
- Date: April 28, 1983
- Imprisoned at: North Branch Correctional Institution

Anthony Grandison (born January 6, 1953) is an American drug dealer and murderer who was formerly on death row in Maryland. He was sentenced to death for ordering the killing of a pair of witnesses in 1983. On December 31, 2014, his sentence was commuted to life without parole by outgoing governor Martin O'Malley who reprieved all four members of Maryland's death row.

== Murder case ==
In 1982, Grandison was on parole after having served several years in prison for assaulting a DEA agent, carrying a firearm during the commission of a felony and possession of a firearm by a convicted felon, a 1979 conviction that was sustained on appeal in 2003. While going through security at Baltimore-Washington International Thurgood Marshall Airport on his way to Miami a baggage screener noticed a substantial amount of cash in Grandison's luggage. The U.S. Marshals service later arrested him on suspicion of violating his parole, and a search of his belongings revealed a key for a room at the Warren House Motel (now a Howard Johnson's) in Pikesville, Maryland. A search of the room found a substantial amount of cocaine and heroin, which resulted in Grandison being indicted on federal drug charges.

Two key witnesses in the government's case were David Scott Piechowicz and his wife, Cheryl. David Piechowicz was the motel's manager, and he and Cheryl were the only two witnesses who could place Grandison in the room where the drugs were found. Cheryl's sister, Susan Kennedy, was filling in for her at work on the morning of April 28, 1983, when Vernon Lee Evans, a hitman who had been hired by Grandison, entered the motel lobby and shot Susan and David 17 times.

== Conviction and sentencing ==
Despite the murder of her husband and sister, Cheryl Piechowicz testified against Grandison 12 days later at his federal drug trial, which ended in Grandison's conviction.

After the Warren House Motel killings, the U.S. government indicted Grandison and Evans along with two co-conspirators, Rodney Kelly (who was Grandison's nephew) and Janet Moore, on charges of witness tampering and conspiracy to violate the civil rights of David Piechowicz. The Baltimore County State's Attorney's office also indicted Grandison and Evans on charges of first degree murder, conspiracy to commit murder, and the use of a handgun in the commission of a felony. Both of these cases led to convictions. Grandison was sentenced to life in the federal case, and received a death sentence after being convicted of state murder charges.

Cheryl Piechowicz (then known as Cheryl Bradshaw) died on February 12, 1998, at the age of 38 of a congenital vascular defect in her brain.

== Legal proceedings ==
After several years of appeals, Grandison's original death sentence was vacated on the basis of inadequate jury instructions in July 1992, as a result of the Supreme Court's decision in another case, Mills v. Maryland. Another sentencing hearing was held, and in June 1994 a second jury again sentenced Grandison to die, because of the aggravating circumstance of the crime being a contractual murder for pay. This sentence was upheld on direct appeal by the Maryland Court of Appeals in 1995. Grandison's petition for post-conviction relief was denied in 1998, and his petition for federal habeas corpus relief was rejected by the U.S. District Court for the District of Maryland in 2000.

A further appeal to the Maryland Court of Appeals was denied in 2005. After Maryland outlawed capital punishment in 2013, his sentence was commuted by Governor Martin O'Malley in 2014.

== See also ==
- Capital punishment in Maryland
- Capital punishment in the United States
