= Brockbridge Correctional Facility =

Former correctional institution in Jessup, Maryland, US

Coordinates: 39°8′5″N 76°46′28″W

- Interactive map of Brockbridge Correctional Facility
- Location: 7930 Brock Bridge Road Jessup, Maryland
- Status: Closed
- Security class: Minimum Security
- Opened: 1966
- Managed by: Maryland Department of Public Safety and Correctional Services
- Warden: Michele Jones

Brockbridge Correctional Facility was a minimum security prison operated by the Maryland Department of Public Safety and Correctional Services in Jessup, Maryland. The facility closed in 2019.

== Prisoners ==
Prisoners at Brockbridge have done beach cleanup after storms hit Maryland. In 2011, Brockbridge had a comedy night for the facility's talent night. Ministers from St. Francis of Assisi Parish in Fulton, Maryland visit Brockbridge.

== Security ==
In 2009, Brockbridge began using the BOSS, or Body Orifice Security Scanner, chair to find contraband.

== Notable incidents ==
In 2010, a fight broke out that injured several inmates. In 2012, a Brockbridge Officer was accused of living a double life. In 2007, an inmate was assaulted by an officer at Brockbridge.

== Notable inmates ==
- Princeton Simmons, brother of Todd Gurley
