= Vernon Lee Evans =

American contract killer (born 1949)

- Born: October 11, 1949 (age 76)
- Conviction: First degree murder (2 counts)
- Penalty: Death; commuted to life imprisonment

Details
- Victims: David Scott Piechowicz; Susan Kennedy
- Date: April 28, 1983
- Imprisoned at: North Branch Correctional Institution

Vernon Lee Evans (born October 11, 1949) is a contract killer convicted for murdering two witnesses scheduled to testify against the leader of a drug gang. In 1984, he was convicted and sentenced to death together with drug kingpin Anthony Grandison for the 1983 murders of Susan Kennedy and David Scott Piechowicz. David Piechowicz and his wife Cheryl (Susan Kennedy's sister) had been scheduled to testify against Grandison at trial on federal drug charges.

The case was intensely discussed in the political debate about eliminating the death penalty in Maryland.

== Conviction and sentencing ==
Evans' death sentence was overturned on appeal in 1991. The following year, a new jury again sentenced him to die. In 1994, the new sentence was upheld on direct appeal to the Maryland Court of Appeals, and in 1997 a petition for post-conviction relief was denied. The U.S. District Court for the District of Maryland denied Evans' federal habeas corpus petition in 1999, and in 2000 that decision was upheld by the Court of Appeals for the Fourth Circuit.

Since then, Evans has filed motions for a new trial and to correct an illegal sentence. Those, however, have been denied as well. He was scheduled for execution in February 2006, but his execution was suspended. All executions in Maryland were placed on hold until the state drafted and approved new execution procedures.

The status of Evans' death sentence became unclear (along with that of four other convicted murderers, including Grandison) when the Maryland House of Delegates voted in 2013 to abolish the death penalty.

On December 31, 2014, Evans' death sentence was one of four commuted to life without parole by outgoing governor Martin O'Malley.

Evans was 65 when his sentence was commuted, and the eldest of the four remaining death row inmates.

== Anti death penalty activism ==
Concern that anti death penalty activists would protest Evans' execution violently, Maryland State Police carried out undercover surveillance of anti death penalty activists for fourteen months. The operation was ended when it came to light; Governor Martin O'Malley called it an "infring(ment) on citizens' rights to free speech or public assembly."

While on death row, anti death penalty activists enabled Evans to write an advice blog designed, according to the Chicago Tribune as "the leading edge of a strategy by death penalty opponents to use new technologies" by making the public see criminals sentenced to death as "human beings with lives beyond the crimes they are accused of." In his blog, Evans claimed not to have committed the murder.

== See also ==
- Capital punishment in Maryland
- Capital punishment in the United States

== General References ==
- Article from ANSA press agency "Rinviata l'esecuzione di Vernon Lee Evans"
- baltimoresun.com
