= Paul Pojman =

American philosopher

Paul Theodore Pojman (October 11, 1966 – September 20, 2012) was a philosopher, activist, and gardener whose interdisciplinary work involved fields such as religion, economics, and ecology. He was a professor of philosophy at Towson University in Maryland from 2002 until his death; he lived in Baltimore city at the Baltimore Free Farm in Hampden.

Pojman was known for his community activism as well as his scholarship. He was involved in the Baltimore Green Currency Association, the Baltimore Free School, and the Baltimore Free Farm, and worked with Occupy Baltimore after it began in October 2011.

Paul Pojman is the son of Louis Pojman, also a philosopher. Paul edited the fifth and sixth editions of his father's popular anthology textbook, Environmental Ethics.

== Biography ==
Paul Pojman was born in New York City, 1966. His family lived in Copenhagen, Denmark; Oxford, England; and South Bend, Indiana, before moving to Richardson, Texas, when he was 13. He was an intelligent child and ranked eighth in the world in chess at the age of 10.

Pojman traveled to India and lived as a Hindu monk for seven years. He told the Deseret News in 2002 that although he no longer considered himself Hindu, he continued to value and contemplate the religion: "You are allowed to believe what you want. This is the complexity of Hinduism.... It's incredibly more diverse than any other religion that has a name."

Pojman taught at Indiana University, University of Central Arkansas, and University of Utah before arriving at Towson University in 2002. He offered classes on anarchism and environmental ethics. He died at 45 of lung cancer. He is survived by his son Theo Pojman, his sister Ruth Freedom, and his mother, Trudy Pojman.

== Thought ==
=== Anarchism ===
Pojman described anarchism in terms of "personal responsibility, local organization," and "non-hierarchical methods", as well as opposition to "rules" (but not "order").

Pojman taught an anarchy class at Towson in which he deferred authority to his students, allowing them to make all decisions about the structure of the course.

=== Spirituality ===
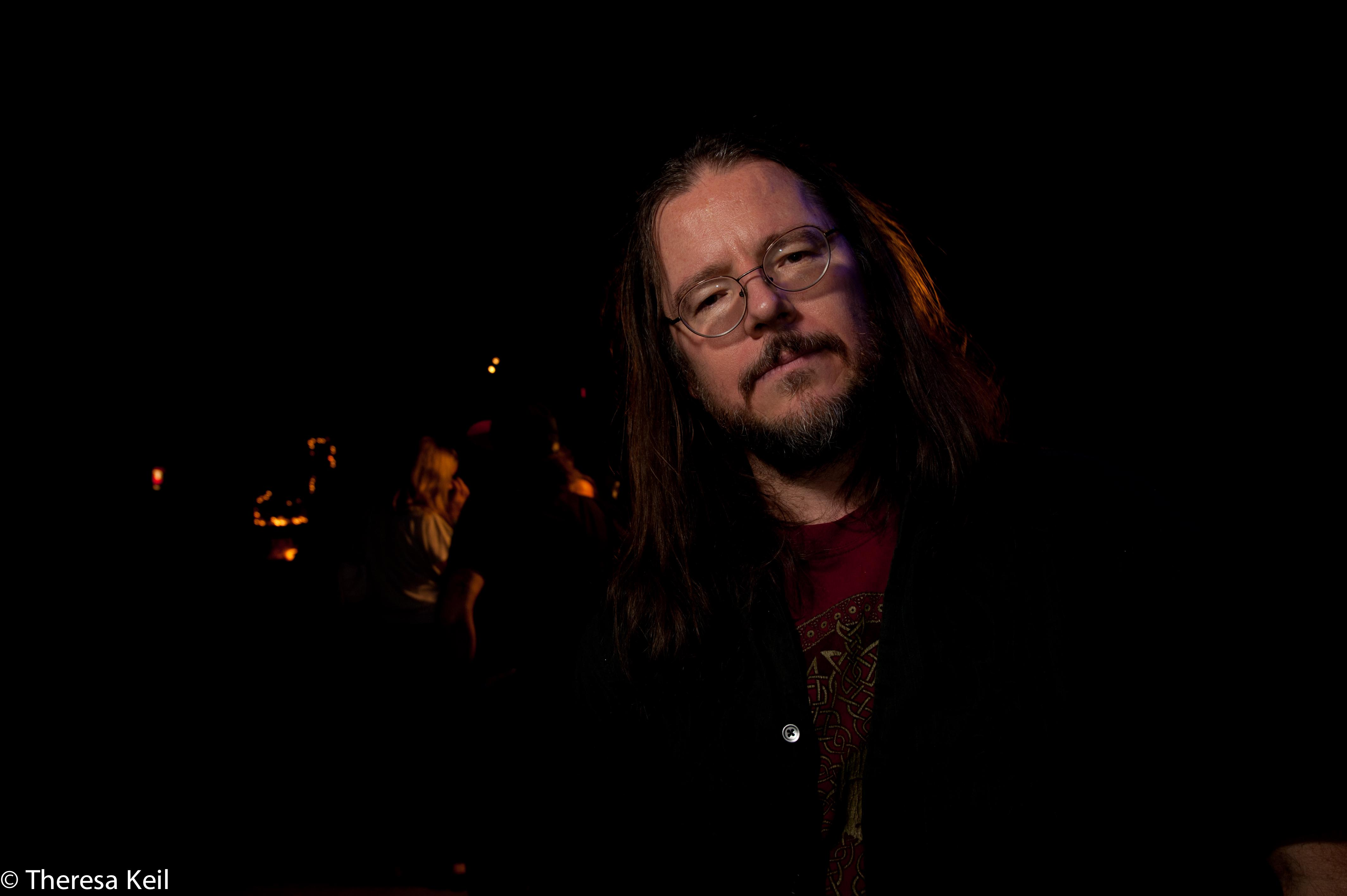
Paul Pojman, September 2011

Pojman probed the relationship between anarchism and religion, arguing that anarchists were wrong to condemn spirituality as automatically complicit in oppression. In his 2009 essay "Anarchospirituality", he writes: "An anarchospirituality might include horizontal social relations, active analyses of class, race and gender dynamics, a culture of tolerant skepticism toward metaphysical beliefs, lots of fun and play, and commitment to social change."

=== Ernst Mach ===
Pojman studied the Austrian thinker Ernst Mach and wrote the entry on Mach for the Stanford Encyclopedia of Philosophy. In a 2011 article Pojman details the influence that Mach's studies of biology and psychology had on his concept of physics. Because human perception of stimuli is relational and not absolute, human perception of space is from the beginning beholden to biological means of sensation and the psychological apparatus for processing these stimuli. This machinery evolved with humans, who live on Earth, and could conceivably operate in many different ways. Pojman describes how Planck and Einstein attempted to deal with Mach's challenge to an absolute physics by "grounding it on physical constants invariant to humans." He writes that regardless of this reformulation, "it is as true today as in Mach’s era that all science is human psychological activity and thus 'ultimately' physics is 'reducible' to psychology.

== Community projects ==
Pojman volunteered at the Baltimore Free School, an organization where classes are freely taught and taken. He offered a class on "Anarchism and Social Practice" when the school opened in 2009. He was also on the Board of Directors of the Baltimore Green Currency Association, the non-profit responsible for the creation of a local currency called the BNote. He sat on the Environmental Initiatives Subcommittee at Towson.

Pojman created links between his students at Towson and the nearby city of Baltimore. In a class on environmental ethics, he asked students to spend 40 hours working on a community project in the city. In the words of Baltimore activist Jerry Raitzyk, Pojman "was able to open up a channel of communication from academia to the folks downtown who were doing the hands-on work with these things."

== Publications ==
- "Anarchospirituality" Social Anarchism. Issue 43, Fall 2009.
- Environmental Ethics: Readings in Theory and Application. Sixth edition. Belmont: Wadsworth, 2011. ISBN 9780538452847.
- "Ernst Mach", Stanford Encyclopedia of Philosophy. Published 21 May 2008; revised 28 April 2009.
- “From Mach to Carnap: a tale of confusions”, in Discourse on a New Method: Reinvigorating the Marriage of History and Philosophy of Science., Eds. Michael Dickson and Mary Domski. Chicago: Open Court, 2010. ISBN 978-0-8126-9662-2.
- Food Ethics. Boston: Cengage, 2011. ISBN 978-1111772307.
- “The Influence of Biology and Psychology upon Physics: Ernst Mach Revisited.” Perspectives on Science, 19 (2). Cambridge: MIT, Summer 2011.
