= Chesapeake Detention Facility =

Correctional institution in Baltimore, Maryland, US

Coordinates: 39°17′55″N 76°36′34″W

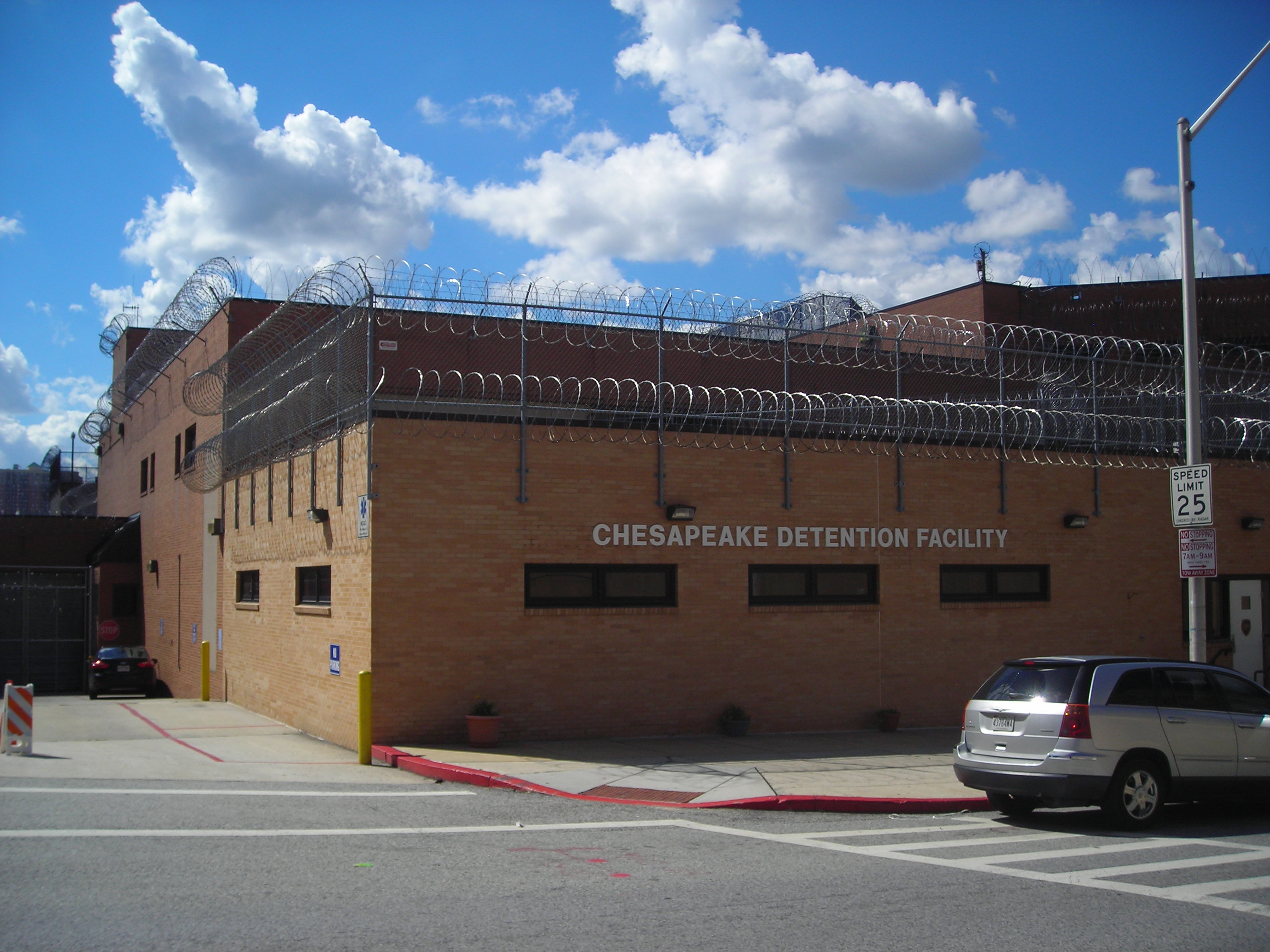
- Interactive map of Chesapeake Detention Facility
- Location: 401 East Madison Street Baltimore, Maryland
- Status: open
- Security class: maximum / supermax
- Capacity: 511
- Opened: 1988
- Managed by: Maryland Department of Public Safety and Correctional Services

The Chesapeake Detention Facility (CDF), previously the Maryland Correctional Adjustment Center (MCAC), is a maximum level II (supermax or control unit) prison operated by the Maryland Department of Public Safety and Correctional Services in Baltimore.

Since April 4, 2012, the state manages the facility under contract with the United States Marshals Service and does not hold state prisoners at CDF.

It was built in 1988, and is located at 401 East Madison Street in Baltimore, Maryland, United States. Prior to February, 2011, inmates housed at MCAC were confined to their cells 23 hours a day Monday through Friday and 24 hours a day on Saturday and Sunday.

The State of Maryland now has a contract with the federal government to solely house federal pre-trial detainees. These federal detainees are not subjected to the supermax conditions that the prior state inmates were subjected to. Federal detainees recreate together both inside and outside every day of the week, eat together, and have access to phones.

Until June 2010, CDF also housed Maryland's death row inmates. Male death row inmates were housed at the North Branch Correctional Institution in Allegany County, Maryland from 2010 until death row was closed in 2014. Executions took place across the street from the MCAC at the former Maryland Penitentiary (now known as the Metropolitan Transition Center).

As with most prisons in Maryland, CDF is headed by a Warden, Assistant Warden, and a Chief of Security. Rules and regulations of the Division of Correction and CDF are enforced by uniformed correctional officers. Uniformed correctional officers consist of, in descending order of rank: Majors, Captains, Lieutenants, Sergeants, Correctional Officer II's, and Correctional Officer I's.
