= Roxbury Correctional Institution =

Correctional institution in Hagerstown, Maryland, US

Coordinates: 39°33′27″N 77°43′1″W

- Interactive map of Roxbury Correctional Institution
- Location: 18701 Roxbury Road Hagerstown, Maryland
- Status: Operational
- Security class: Level II Medium adult males
- Capacity: Up to 1824
- Opened: 1983
- Managed by: Maryland Department of Public Safety and Correctional Services
- Warden: Carlos D. Bivens

Notable prisoners
- Fluctuates

Roxbury Correctional Institution is a medium security prison operated by the Maryland Department of Public Safety and Correctional Services in Hagerstown, Maryland.

== Prisoners ==
In 2014, twenty-five war veterans at Roxbury took part in the nationally recognized POW/MIA recognition day.

In 2015, Darryl Strawberry gave a motivational speech to inmates at Roxbury. Inmates at Roxbury take care of animals through a program that also benefits the inmates.

== Notable incidents ==
In 2006, an inmate shot Roxbury guard Jeffrey Wroten while he was being guarded by him at a local hospital.

In 2014, two former guards were sentenced to prison in federal court for assaulting an inmate in 2008.

== Notable Inmates ==
Inmate Name	Register Number	Status	Details
Vernon Lee Clark	281508 / 218759	Serving a life sentence without parole.	Was originally convicted of 3 murders before being found guilty of a 4th.
Malik Samartaney	77821 / 00486109	Serving a 41-year sentence.	Born Lawrence Banks, who was originally convicted of murdering his own son and another man, Micheal Chisholm, in the 1990s. Was later convicted of murdering and dismembering his own daughter.
