= North Branch Correctional Institution =

Correctional institution near Cumberland, Maryland, US

- Interactive map of North Branch Correctional Institution
- Location: Cumberland, Maryland postal address, 21502; 39.60254°N 78.81779°W
- Status: Operational
- Security class: Maximum adult males
- Population: 1,396 (daily average) (2010)
- Opened: 2003
- Managed by: Maryland Department of Public Safety and Correctional Services
- Warden: Keith K. Arnold

North Branch Correctional Institution (NBCI) is a high-tech, maximum security prison or "hyper-max prison" operated by the Maryland Department of Public Safety and Correctional Services in Cresaptown census-designated place, unincorporated Allegany County, United States, near Cumberland.

== Background ==
NBCI initially opened in January 2003 as an extension of the earlier adjacent Western Correctional Institution, with full independent operation beginning in the summer 2008 with the completion of housing unit construction. Final construction costs amounted to more than $175 million. In 2011, operating costs totaled $50,613,215 for 1,471 inmates, equating to approximately $34,407 per inmate per year. With 555 employees in 2011, NBCI is the eighth-largest employer in Allegany County.

== Security and safety ==
Since the closure of the Maryland House of Correction in Jessup, Maryland, in 2007, NBCI has housed the most serious offenders within the state of Maryland, including death row inmates (before the death penalty sentences were commuted to life without parole following Maryland's abolition of the death penalty). At the time of its construction, the NBCI was one of the most technologically advanced prisons in the world, and was the first of its kind in the United States.

The prison was constructed using an "inverted fortress" style of building placement, with a master control tower sitting in the middle of a complex that is ringed with housing units and support structures. The control tower is designed for maximum oversight with minimal staffing, requiring only two officers to maintain the entire security system. It has an unobstructed view of the entire grounds, as well as a complete surveillance of every area accessed by inmates. Additionally, the tower has control over all security doors, cameras and even the flow of water into individual cells. Instead of one large cell block, the prison has separate housing blocks all zoned and protected so the movement of inmates is eased, reducing the risk of riots and violence.

Four units of 256 cells house the inmate population. Each cell is just over 60 square feet (5.6 m^{2}) and is constructed of cast concrete that prevents seams in construction in which to hide contraband. Cell door windows are made of ballistic-resistant glass to allow easier observation and to enhance officer safety. The cells' furnishings are relatively minimal. The beds are bolted directly into the concrete and the bolts are rounded down so the inmates cannot remove them to use the beds to ram the doors. The toilets and sinks are brushed stainless steel instead of porcelain to avoid porcelain shards being broken off and being made into weapons. The piping behind the fixtures is also reinforced so if an inmate were to remove the fixture, he could not escape, and even if he could successfully tunnel through he would end up in the plumbing box which has a similar cell door. The cell doors are by far the most evolved feature of the prison as opposed to the classic cell bar doors. The doors have micro-perforations to allow corrections officers to speak with inmates and vice versa. The cell doors also have small slots that can be opened to provide meals to inmates perceived as too dangerous to be let out to the dining area and to handcuff the inmates before exiting providing corrections officers with maximum control over inmate movement. The door frames are filled with concrete to prevent tampering. The walls of the cells are coated with a high grade epoxy paint resistant to scratching, chipping and even acid. The perimeter consists of 15 miles (24 km) of inwardly curved razor wire and motion sensors, as well as regular patrols and fence inspections. Trained dogs are used to find illicit materials, including cell phones.

== Notable incidents ==
In March 2008, several inmates were injured in what was deemed excessive use of force at the NBCI. These inmates had allegedly been assaulted by North Branch staff shortly after transfer to the facility from nearby Roxbury Correctional Institution after being uncooperative and violent towards RCI officers. This incident led to six NBCI officers being fired and assault charges being filed.

Several homicides have occurred since operations began. On February 10, 2013, an inmate was found dead in his cell in what was described as an apparent homicide. An inmate's death in January at a Baltimore hospital was ruled a homicide. He had been assaulted by another inmate at NBCI the previous November. An inmate was found dead in his cell on September 27, 2012, after an apparent strangulation. This led to the indictment of his cellmate on murder charges in January 2013. On December 8, 2011, an inmate was found unresponsive in his cell. His death was ruled a homicide by strangulation.

On Monday May 8, 2013, an inmate stabbed a correctional officer several times in the head, neck and upper torso at around 8:40am. Officials with the Maryland Department of Public Safety and Correctional Services said the officer, who was in his 30s, and a four-year DPSCS veteran, were taken by ambulance to Western Maryland Regional Medical Center with non-life threatening injuries.

== Notable inmates ==
=== Current ===
- Jarrod Warren Ramos - Perpetrator of the 2018 Capital Gazette shooting in which he murdered five people.
- Alexander Wayne Jr. Watson - Murdered four people from 1986–1994.
- Anthony Grandison – drug dealer and murderer – formerly on death row
- Vernon Lee Evans – contract killer convicted of murdering two witnesses in 1983 – formerly on death row

=== Former ===
- Adnan Masud Syed – convicted of murder in the January 1999 killing of Hae Min Lee, released in September 2022 after the conviction was overturned.

== In popular culture ==
NBCI has been featured on the television programs MegaStructures, Big, Bigger, Biggest and Lockdown.
