= Maryland Department of Public Safety and Correctional Services =

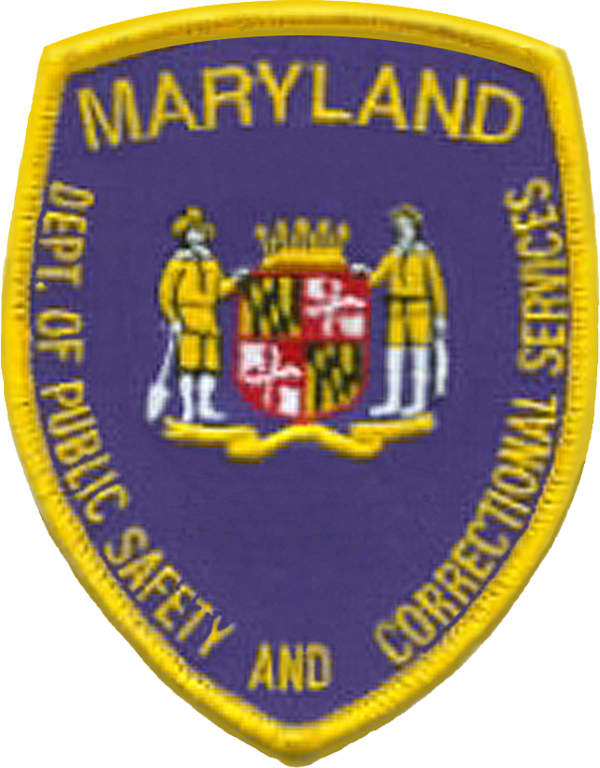

Jurisdictional structure
- Operations jurisdiction: Maryland, USA
- Map of Maryland Department of Public Safety and Correctional Services's jurisdiction
- General nature: Local civilian police

Operational structure
- Headquarters: Baltimore County, Maryland
- Agency executive: David Greene, Acting Secretary

The Maryland Department of Public Safety and Correctional Services (DPSCS) is a government agency of the State of Maryland that performs a number of functions, including the operation of state prisons. It has its headquarters in an unincorporated area of Baltimore County, Maryland, United States, with a Baltimore address. There are additional offices in Sykesville.

== Administration ==
The headquarters were previously in Towson.

=== Organizational units ===
Some of the agencies contained within the Maryland Department of Public Safety and Correctional Services include:

- Criminal Injuries Compensation Board
- Division of Capital Construction and Facilities Maintenance
- Division of Correction
- Division of Parole and Probation
- Division of Pretrial Detention and Services (operates the former Baltimore City Jail - now the Baltimore City Detention Center and the pre-trial release programs in the city of Baltimore)
- Emergency Number Systems Board
- Handgun Permit Review Board
- Inmate Grievance Office
- Internal Investigative Division
- Information Technology and Communications Division
- Maryland Correctional Enterprises
- Maryland Parole Commission
- Office of the Inspector General
- Office of Planning, Policy, Regulations, and Statistics
- Office of the Secretary
- Police and Correctional Training Commissions
- Public Information Office
- Sundry Claims Board

== Facilities ==
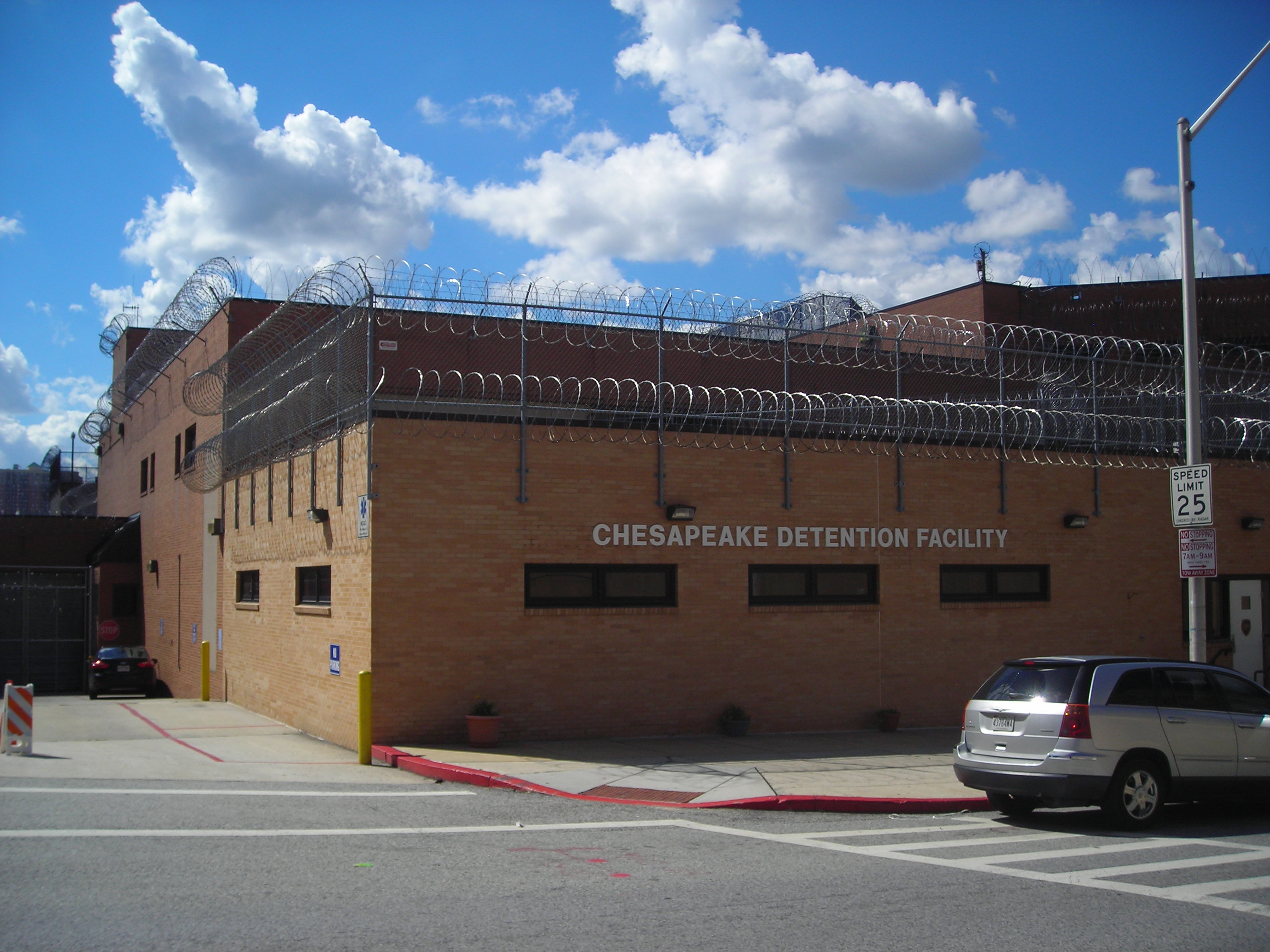
Chesapeake Detention Facility

Detention Facilities
Name	Security Level	County
Baltimore Central Booking and Intake Center	Intake	Baltimore City
Chesapeake Detention Facility	Maximum	Baltimore City
Maryland Reception, Diagnostic, and Classification Center	Intake	Baltimore City
Metropolitan Transition Center	Medium	Baltimore City
Youth Detention Center	Maximum	Baltimore City

Correctional Facilities
Name	Security Level	County
Baltimore City Correctional Center	Minimum, Pre-Release, Work Release	Baltimore City
Central Maryland Correctional Facility	Minimum, Pre-Release	Carroll
Dorsey Run Correctional Facility	Minimum, Pre-Release	Anne Arundel
Eastern Correctional Institution	Medium	Somerset
Jessup Correctional Institution	Maximum	Anne Arundel
Maryland Correctional Institution–Hagerstown	Medium	Washington
Maryland Correctional Institution–Jessup	Medium	Anne Arundel
Maryland Correctional Institution for Women	Minimum, Medium, Maximum, Pre-Release	Anne Arundel
Maryland Correctional Transition Center	Minimum, Medium, Pre-Release	Washington
North Branch Correctional Institution	Maximum	Allegany
Patuxent Institution	Maximum	Anne Arundel
Roxbury Correctional Institution	Medium	Washington
Western Correctional Institution	Maximum	Allegany

=== Closed facilities ===
- Herman L. Toulson Correctional Facility - Jessup
- Jessup Pre-Release Unit - Jessup
- Maryland House of Correction - Jessup
- Brockbridge Correctional Facility - Jessup

=== Proposed facilities ===
- New Youth Detention Facility (Baltimore City)
- New Women's Detention Facility (Baltimore City)

== Death row ==
The "Death Row" for men was in the North Branch Correctional Institution in Western Maryland's Cumberland area. The execution chamber is in the Metropolitan Transition Center (the former Maryland Penitentiary). The five men who were on the State's "death row" were moved in June 2010 from the Maryland Correctional Adjustment Center. In December 2014, former Governor Martin O'Malley commuted the sentences of all Maryland death row inmates to life sentences.

== Black Guerrilla Family ==
In 2009, a federal indictment under the RICO Act charges that the Black Guerrilla Family gang was active in a number of facilities, including North Branch Correctional Institution, Western Correctional Institution, Eastern Correctional Institution, Roxbury Correctional Institution, Maryland Correctional Institution – Jessup, Maryland Correctional Institution – Hagerstown, Baltimore City Correctional Center, and Metropolitan Transition Center, and the Baltimore City Detention Center (formerly and also known as the Baltimore City Jail).

The gang had a statewide "supreme commander" as well as subordinate commanders in each facility. These leaders were assisted by other gang officials dubbed ministers of intelligence, justice, defense and education. These organizations enforced a code of conduct and smuggled contraband into the facilities.

Another prison gang, this one of mostly white prisoners, known as "D.M.I." Dead Man Incorporated was founded in Maryland prisons in 2001 or 2002 as an offshoot of the Black Guerrilla Family.

== Fallen officers ==
Since the establishment of the Maryland Department of Public Safety and Correctional Services, five officers have died while on duty.

== See also ==
- List of law enforcement agencies in Maryland

National:

- List of United States state correction agencies
- Lists of United States state prisons
