= Governorship of Wes Moore =

Wes Moore's tenure as the 63rd Governor of Maryland

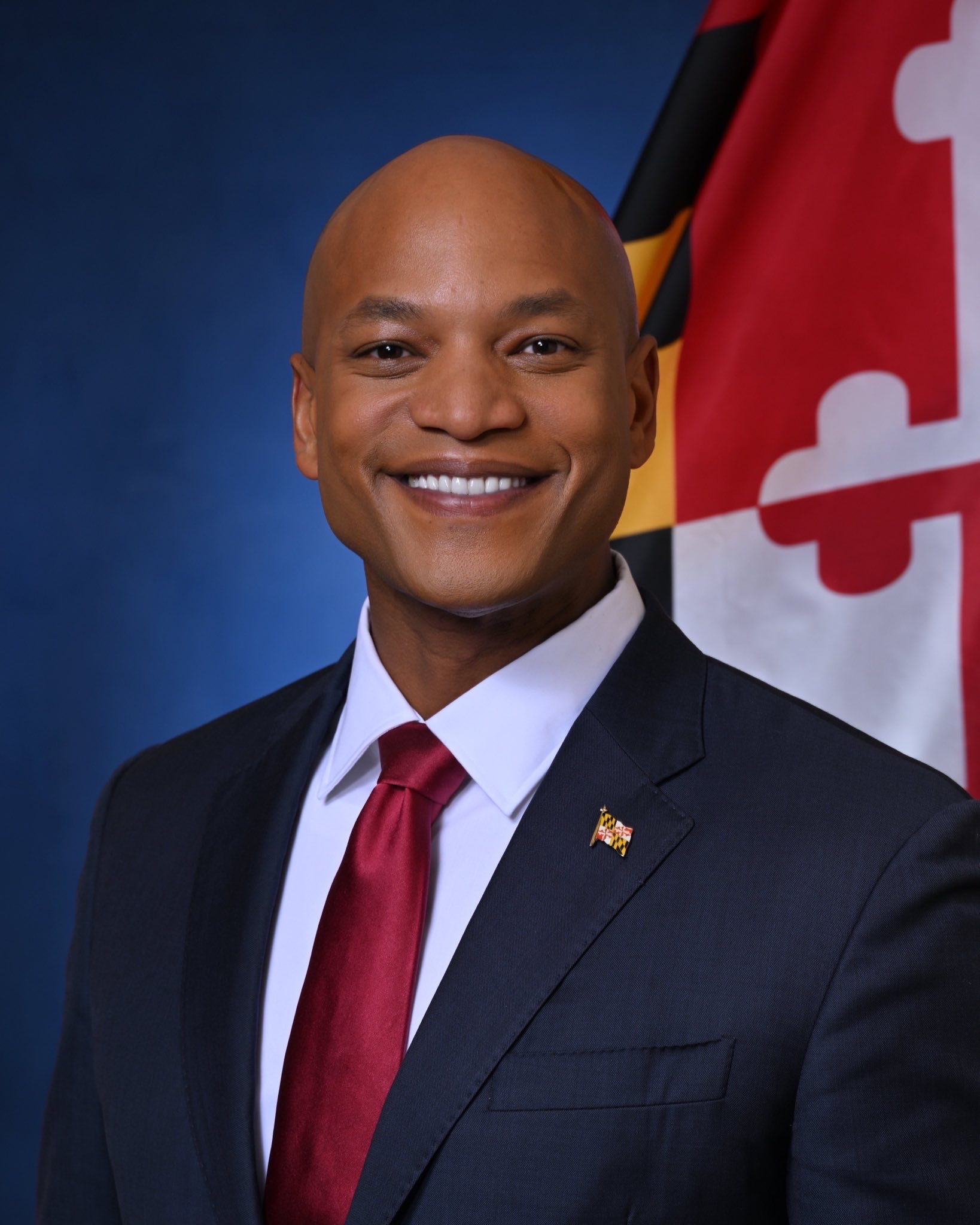
- Official portrait, 2023
- Governorship of Wes Moore; January 18, 2023 – present
- Party: Democratic
- Election: 2022; 2026
- Seat: Government House
- Seal of Maryland

Wes Moore became the 63rd governor of Maryland on January 18, 2023. A member of the Democratic Party, he defeated far-right state delegate Dan Cox in the 2022 Maryland gubernatorial election by a margin of 32%, becoming the state's first African-American governor. Moore won re-election to a second term in 2026, again defeating Cox in the general election.

Moore has generally governed as a moderate. During his first term, he supported removing regulations limiting new housing development, restarted efforts to build the Red Line, and supported the implementation of the Blueprint for Maryland's Future. He also backed efforts to establish a service year option for high school graduates, improve abortion access and public safety, and decrease child poverty in Maryland. Moore engaged in recovery efforts after the Francis Scott Key Bridge collapse, and oversaw the passage of a tax reform bill in 2025.

== Political ideology ==
During an August 2006 interview with C-SPAN, Moore identified as a "registered Democrat" who is a "social moderate and strong fiscal conservative". In September 2022, he reiterated his position on fiscal issues as being "fiscally responsible". During his gubernatorial campaign, he was described as center-left as well as progressive. He has been described as a moderate during his tenure as governor.

Moore has cited Jared Polis, Parris Glendening, and Roy Cooper as his political role models.

== Inauguration ==
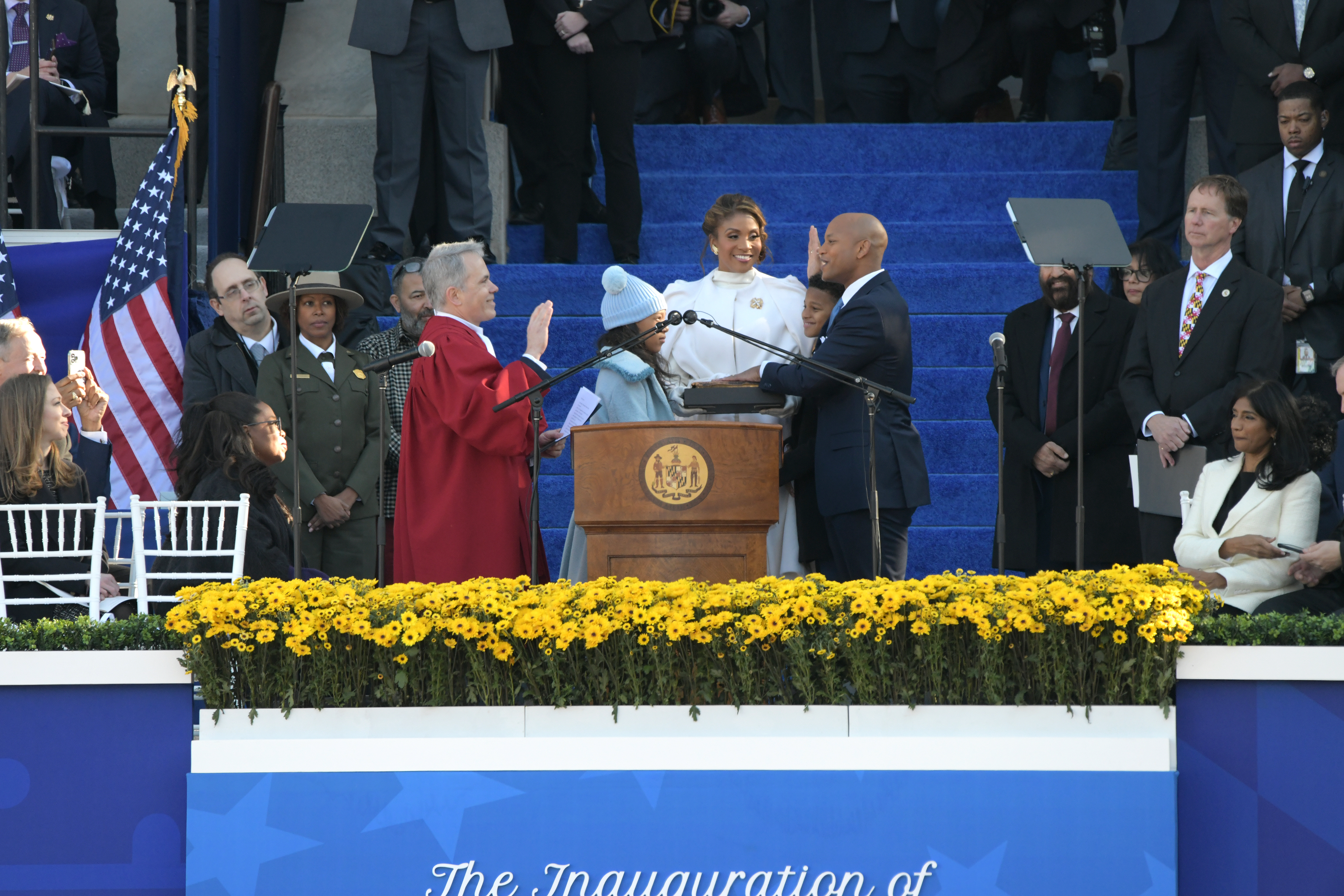
Moore being sworn in as governor, 2023

Moore was sworn in on January 18, 2023. He took the oath of office on a Bible owned by abolitionist Frederick Douglass, as well as his grandfather's Bible. The morning before his inauguration, Moore participated in a wreath-laying ceremony at the Kunta Kinte-Alex Haley Memorial at the Annapolis City Dock to "acknowledge the journey" that led to him becoming the third elected Black governor in U.S. history. Later that night, he held a celebratory event at the Baltimore Convention Center.

== Cabinet ==
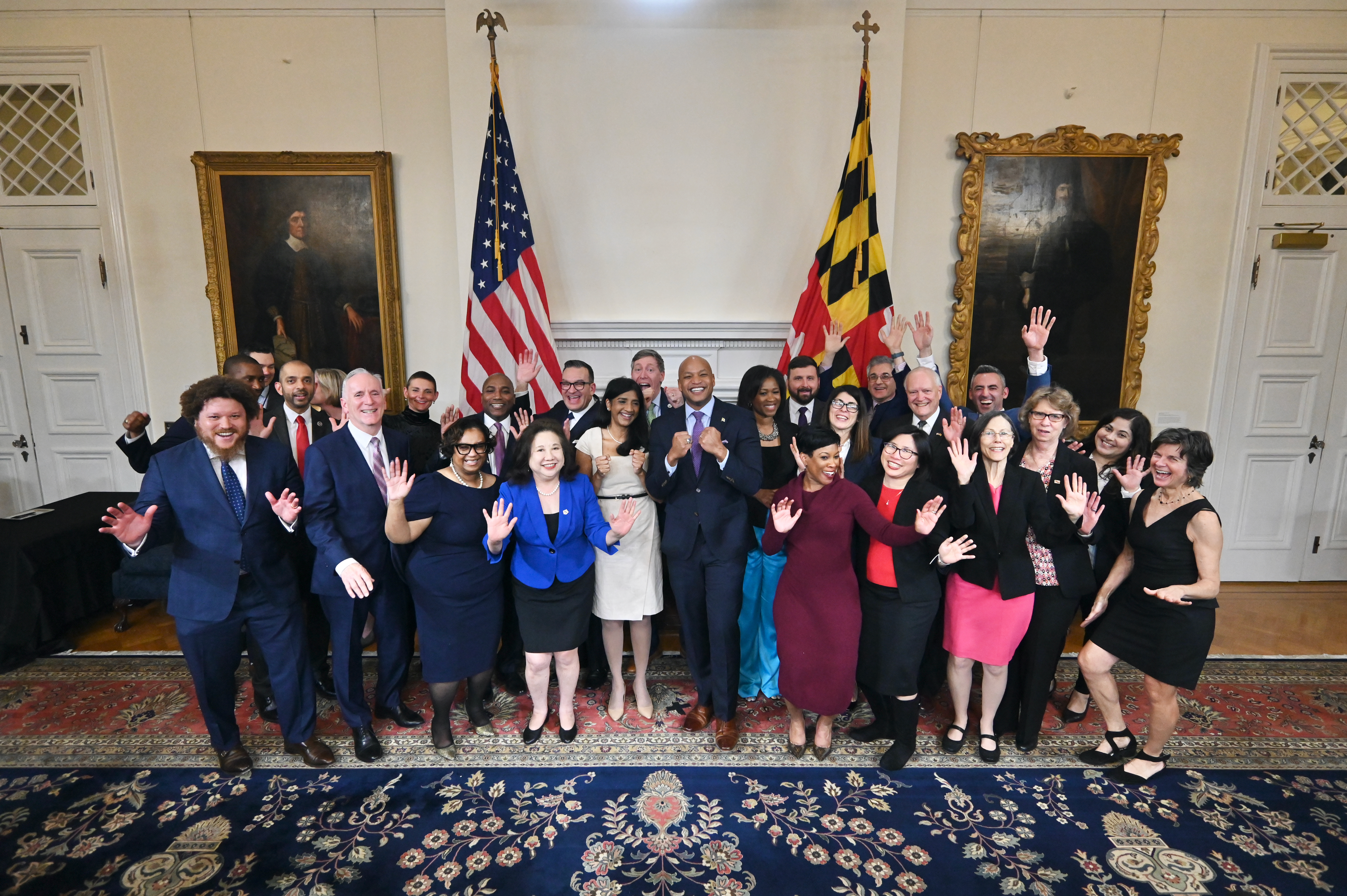
Moore with members of his Cabinet, 2023

Moore began announcing nominations for his 26-member cabinet on November 14, 2022. He finished announcing his cabinet nominees on April 12, 2023, with the nomination of Sanjay Rai as Secretary for the Maryland Higher Education Commission. According to The Baltimore Banner, Moore assembled his cabinet at a slower pace than previous Maryland governors. Three of Moore's Cabinet nominees, Secretary of Emergency Management Russell Strickland, Maryland State Police superintendent Roland Butler, and Secretary of Public Safety and Correctional Services Carolyn Scruggs, are holdovers from the Hogan administration.

As his chief of staff, Moore chose Fagan Harris, who co-founded the Baltimore Corps organization with Moore a decade ago. Moore also named three members of the Maryland General Assembly to his administration: state senator Paul G. Pinsky as director of the Maryland Energy Administration; state senator Susan C. Lee as Secretary of State; and House of Delegates Majority Leader Eric Luedtke as chief legislative officer. Other notable Cabinet nominations included Salisbury mayor Jacob R. Day as Secretary of Housing and Community Development, former New York City Department of Correction commissioner Vincent Schiraldi as Secretary of Juvenile Services, Anthony Woods as Secretary of Veterans Affairs, and former WMATA general manager Paul Wiedefeld as Secretary of Transportation.

All but two of Moore's cabinet nominees were unanimously confirmed by the Maryland Senate: Schiraldi, who faced opposition from Republicans over his policies toward juvenile justice reform; and Butler, whose critics claimed had not done enough to address complaints of racism and disparate treatment of Black officers in the Maryland State Police.

Several of Moore's cabinet secretaries resigned in 2025. Kevin Anderson, the Maryland Secretary of Commerce, transitioned to an economic development advisor to the governor in January 2025 and was succeeded by Harry Coker, who served as the United States National Cyber Director from 2023 to 2025. Laura Herrera Scott resigned as Maryland Secretary of Health at the end of February 2025, and was succeeded by Meena Seshamani, who served as the director of the Centers for Medicare & Medicaid Services from 2021 to 2025. Anthony Woods resigned as Maryland Secretary of Veterans and Military Families to take a private sector job in May 2025, and was succeeded by Republican Carroll County commissioner Ed Rothstein in August 2025. In June 2025, Vincent Schiraldi resigned as Maryland Secretary of Juvenile Services, citing negative media attention of him and a small number of youth committing crimes, though Moore later claimed on WBAL-AM that he had "ordered" Schiraldi's resignation. In July 2025, Paul Wiedefeld said that he would resign as Maryland Secretary of Transportation on August 1; he was succeeded by Kathryn Thomas, who served as deputy administrator of the Federal Aviation Administration from 2023 to 2025. In August 2025, Moore's chief of staff, Fagan Harris, announced that he would resign his post at the end of the year to become the next president of the Abell Foundation; he was succeeded by Lester Davis, a CareFirst BlueCross BlueShield executive who worked as an unpaid outside advisor to Moore's 2022 gubernatorial campaign. In October 2025, Roland Butler resigned as secretary of state police and was succeeded by state senator Michael A. Jackson. In November 2025, Paul Monteiro resigned as secretary of Maryland Department of Service and Civic Innovation and was succeeded by Jonny Dorsey, one of Moore's deputy chiefs of staff.

In October 2025, Moore appointed Walter Simmons to serve as the secretary of the newly created Department of Social and Economic Mobility.

Seven of Moore's cabinet secretaries resigned in 2026. Maryland Secretary of Human Services Rafael López, who resigned on February 23, citing health reasons, and was succeeded by deputy secretary Gloria Brown Burnett, who will serve as acting secretary until April 1, when Stacy Rodgers will then take over as acting secretary. In March 2026, Rai announced that he would step down on March 27, and would be succeeded by deputy secretary Elena Quiroz-Livanis, who will serve as acting secretary until a search for a new, permanent secretary is completed. In November 2026, after Moore won re-election to a second term, five of Moore's cabinet secretaries announced their resignations: Scruggs, Lee, Rothstein, McIlwain, and Stirckland. Moore's chief of staff, Lester Davis, also resigned to become the interim CEO of the Maryland Technology Development Corporation, and was succeeded by his principal deputy chief of staff, Manny Welsh.

The Moore Cabinet
Office	Name	Term
Governor	Wes Moore	2023–present
Lieutenant Governor	Aruna Miller	2023–present
Adjutant General	Janeen L. Birckhead	2023–present
Secretary of Aging	Carmel Roques	2023–present
Secretary of Agriculture	Kevin Atticks	2023–present
Secretary of Budget and Management	Helene Grady	2023–2025
Jake Weissmann	2025–present
Secretary of Commerce	Kevin Anderson	2023–2025
Harry Coker	2025–present
Secretary of Disabilities	Carol Beatty	2015–present
Secretary of Environment	Serena McIlwain	2023–2026
Secretary of General Services	Atif Chaudhry	2023–present
Secretary of Health	Laura Herrera Scott	2023–2025
Meena Seshamani	2025–present
Secretary of Housing and Community Development	Jacob R. Day	2023–present
Secretary of Human Services	Rafael López	2023–2026
Stacy Rodgers	2026–present
Secretary of Information Technology	Katie Savage	2023–present
Secretary of Juvenile Services	Vincent Schiraldi	2023–2025
Betsy Fox Tolentino	2025–present
Secretary of Labor	Portia Wu	2023–present
Secretary of Natural Resources	Josh Kurtz	2023–present
Secretary of Planning	Rebecca Flora	2023–present
Secretary of Public Safety and Correctional Services	Carolyn Scruggs	2023–2026
Secretary of Service and Civil Innovation	Paul Monteiro	2023–2025
Jonny Dorsey	2025–present
Secretary of Social and Economic Mobility	Walter Simmons	2025–present
Secretary of State Police	Roland Butler	2023–2025
Michael A. Jackson	2025–present
Secretary of Transportation	Paul Wiedefeld	2023–2025
Kathryn Thomson	2025–present
Secretary of Veterans and Military Families	Anthony Woods	2023–2025
Ed Rothstein	2025–2026

== Economy ==
=== Overview ===
Before taking office, Maryland's economic outlook was among the lowest in the nation, according to the American Legislative Exchange Council. Over the past decade, the state's gross domestic product (GDP) had only grown by 11 percent, compared to a 23 percent growth nationally, and ranked in the bottom 10 states in several economic factors, including economic momentum, change in personal income, and population growth. At the same time, the state had a $2.5 billion budget surplus from a combination of federal pandemic aid and a tightening of state spending, $2.9 billion in its "rainy day fund", and low unemployment numbers. By May 2026, Maryland's unemployment rate had nearly doubled as a result of federal mass layoffs as well as cuts to federal contracts and grants—which Maryland's economy is heavily reliant on—by the second Trump administration.

During the 2023 legislative session, Moore introduced the Innovation Economy Infrastructure Act, which would provide $10 million in grants for "infrastructure projects in eligible technology sectors"; the Access to Banking Act, which incentives banking institutions to locate in low- and moderate-income areas of the state; and the Broadband Expansion Act, which initially offered tax incentives to the broadband internet industry but was later watered down to a bill to study how to incentivize broadband expansion. All three bills were signed into law in May 2023.

In May 2024, Moody's Ratings issued a report expressing concerns with Maryland's fiscal stability, citing imminent structural deficits driven by programs including the Blueprint for Maryland's Future. In May 2025, Moody's decreased Maryland's bond rating from AAA to AA1, saying that while Maryland had addressed its budget problems "through a combination of tax increases and restraints on expenditures", the state was economically and fiscally underperforming other states with an AAA bond rating. Moody's report also predicted that Maryland would continue to underperform economically due to the state's "heightened vulnerability to shifting federal policies and employment, and its elevated fixed costs". At the same time, Fitch Ratings and S&P Global Ratings maintained Maryland's AAA rating, though Fitch similarly expressed concerns with the state's ability to fund the Blueprint. In May 2026, Maryland ended its relationship with Moody's, replacing it with the Kroll Bond Rating Agency.

In December 2024, Moore endorsed a bill that would allow sales of beer and wine in grocery stores, calling Maryland's laws on alcohol sales "out of step with the rest of the country". However, he later signaled that he wouldn't include the bill in his administration's official priorities, instead preferring to focus on addressing the state's multi-billion dollar deficit during the 2025 legislative session. The bill to allow beer and wine sales in grocery stores was withdrawn by its sponsor, Cory McCray, moments before it was poised to be killed by the Senate Finance Committee, and its House crossfile never received a vote in the House Economic Matters Committee. As of 2025, Maryland is one of five states that do not allow alcohol sales except in liquor or packaged goods stores.

During the 2026 legislative session, Moore introduced the DECADE Act, which extends initiatives for companies in tax-incentive zones and eliminates certain eligibility requirements for startup businesses to qualify for assistance programs, and another bill to ban surveillance pricing and dynamic pricing in grocery stores. Moore signed the dynamic pricing ban into law in April 2026.

=== Labor ===
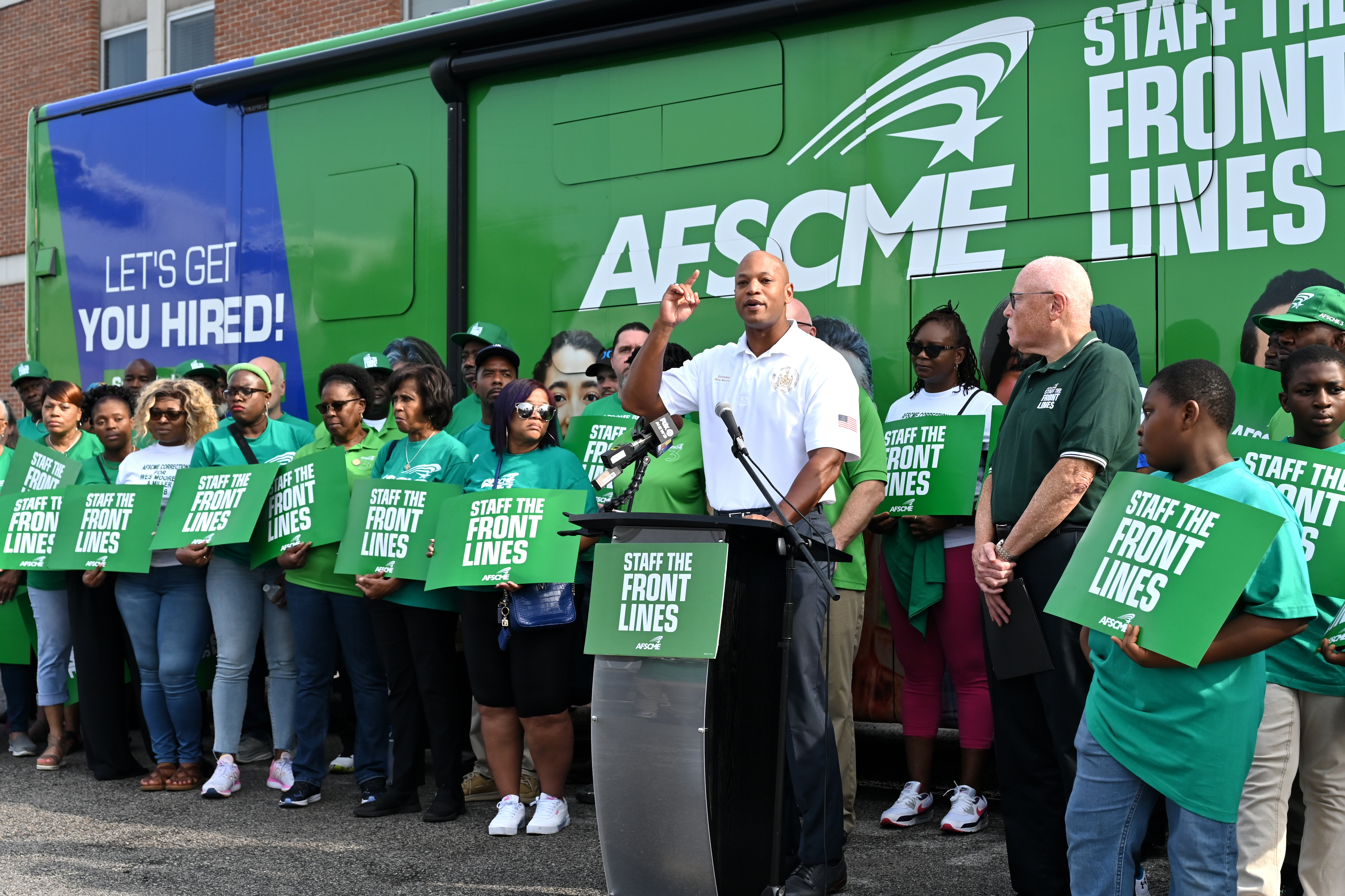
Moore rallying with AFSCME union members, 2023

During his first term as governor, Moore had a rocky relationship with some of the state's labor unions—including the Maryland State & DC AFL-CIO, AFSCME Maryland Council 3, and UNITE HERE Local 7—but positive relationships with other labor unions.

Before taking office, the Maryland Department of Legislative Services reported a "historically high" level of vacancies in state government, with only three departments in the executive branch having vacancy rates lower than 10 percent. During his 2022 gubernatorial campaign, Moore promised to fill 5,000 vacancies within his first year in office, and included raises up to 18 percent for state employees to incentivize recruitment and retention. As of October 2023, only 791 positions had been filled, according to data from the Maryland Department of Legislative Services.

In February 2023, Moore said he would scrap the Maryland Aviation Administration's controversial contract process to run concessions operations at Baltimore/Washington International Airport. In March, he promised to include a "labor peace" agreement in future BWI concessions operations contracts. The BWI contract bidding process restarted in September 2023, and includes provisions to include the labor peace agreement, which would allow service workers to unionize but prohibited strikes. In October 2024, the Maryland Department of Transportation's evaluation committee awarded a 20-year contract to run concessions operations at BWI to URW/Harbor Bankshare, a partnership between Unibail-Rodamco-Westfield and The Harbor Bank of Maryland, which was approved by the Board of Public Works in February 2025.

During the 2024 legislative session, Moore introduced the Families Serve Act, which would allow employers to give preference to military dependents in hiring; and the Time to Serve Act, which doubles the amount of days of leave state employees can take to fulfill duties in military reserves. He also supported bills to ban discrimination toward military members in hiring. Both bills passed and were signed into law.

In February 2025, Moore announced several state government initiatives to hire federal workers and contractors displaced by the Trump administration's mass layoffs, and called on private sector and nonprofit entities in the state to do the same. In June 2025, he announced to state employees that the state would seek to cut about $121 million from the state's personnel budget through a combination of employee buy-out offers, a hiring freeze, and the elimination of at least 150 vacant positions. The state also put on hold its expedited hiring program for federal workers affected by mass layoffs. 502 state government positions were eliminated as a result of the Moore administration's workforce reduction efforts, including 332 positions that were eliminated after workers agreed to buyouts.

In January 2026, the Moore administration reached annual pay agreements with six state employee unions, but failed to reach an agreement with AFSCME Maryland Council 3, the state's largest union of state government workers, by the December 31 deadline. Despite this, a pay increase for AFSCME-represented workers equivalent to agreements reached with several smaller unions that average 2% was included in Moore's fiscal year 2027 budget proposal. In September 2026, Moore signed an executive order raising the minimum wage for direct state conract employees at BWI to $18 an hour.

=== Minimum wage ===
During his 2022 gubernatorial campaign, Moore said that he would accelerate the state's incremental increase to a minimum wage of $15 an hour by 2023. He also supports indexing the state's minimum wage to inflation. At the beginning of the 2023 legislative session, Moore introduced the Fair Wage Act, a bill that would accelerate the state's minimum wage build-up to reach $15 an hour by October 2023 and index the minimum wage to the consumer price index starting in July 2025, with increases capped at five percent per year. The Senate Finance Committee amended the bill to remove provisions linking it to the consumer price index and delayed the wage increase until January 1, 2024. Moore signed the bill into law on April 11, 2023. He also allocated $218 million in his first budget to support state service providers in keeping up with the accelerated wage increase.

=== Social programs ===
In July 2021, Moore said he opposed Governor Larry Hogan's decision to end expanded federal unemployment benefits provided by the American Rescue Plan Act of 2021 early. In December 2022, Moore said he supported indexing the state's maximum unemployment insurance payment to inflation.

In August 2022, Moore supported protests led by veterans at the United States Capitol to pass the Honoring our PACT Act of 2022, which would provide benefits for veterans exposed to burn pits and other toxic phenomena.

During his gubernatorial campaign, Moore said he supported establishing a state "baby bonds" program, which would cost roughly $100 million per year and be seeded with $3,200 for every child born on Medicaid, to target the racial wealth gap. If enacted, it would be the largest baby bond program ever enacted in the United States. In September 2022, he told the Maryland Family Network that he would support child care programs by subsidizing the service through tax credits for low-income families. Moore has not advocated for establishing a statewide baby bonds program since becoming governor, but has supported other measures toward expanding childcare access in the state such as an expansion of Maryland's child tax credit.

During the 2024 legislative session, Moore introduced the ENOUGH Act, a bill to provide $15 million in grants toward underserved communities. The bill passed and was signed into law in May 2024.

=== Taxes ===
During his 2022 gubernatorial campaign, Moore repeatedly said that he did not anticipate raising taxes as governor, but said in September 2022 that he planned to work with the legislature to fix what he described as the state's "upside-down taxation system". In January 2024, he expressed openness to raising taxes to address the state's budget shortfall, but said that any conversation about taxes would have a "very high bar". That year, the legislature amended Moore's budget proposal, which included no tax increases, to add about $252 million in increases toward transportation-related fees and tobacco taxes to help pay for the Blueprint for Maryland's Future reforms and state transportation projects.

In May 2022, following a spike in gas prices as a result of the Russo-Ukrainian War, Moore said he supported staving off automatic increases to the state's gas tax, arguing that voters needed immediate relief and later calling it a "regressive tax". He also expressed interest in eliminating either the state's estate or inheritance tax to make the state more attractive to retirees. In June 2023, Moore said he supported shifting transportation funding away from the state's gas tax as well as decoupling it from inflation, but opposed calling a special session to do so, instead preferring to pass tax reforms during the 2024 legislative session. In March 2026, Moore opposed a Republican proposal to implement a 30-day gas tax holiday following a spike in gas prices as a result of the 2026 Iran war.

During the 2023 legislative session, Moore introduced the Family Prosperity Act, which allocates $171 million toward making permanent the earned income tax credit passed by lawmakers in 2021, and the Keep Our Heroes Home Act, which provides $33 million for expanding tax exemptions for military retirement income; legislators later scaled down the Keep Our Heroes Home Act to only raise the state's income exemption limit to $20,000 for older veterans and $12,500 for younger ones. Moore signed both bills into law in April and May 2023, as well as another bill to allow workers to deduct union dues from their income taxes.

In August 2023, following a report from the Maryland Department of Legislative Services predicting that the state's budget deficits would increase to $1.8 billion annually by 2028, Moore cautioned that the state would enter a "season of discipline". He also pledged to hire a chief performance officer, later naming Asma Mirza, the deputy for implementation management for the White House Infrastructure Implementation Team, to the position. During the 2024 legislative session, Moore opposed proposals to raise income taxes to correct the state's incoming budgetary woes, instead proposing a budget that would significantly cut funding for transportation and higher education projects; legislators were able to avert many of the proposed transportation cuts by raising taxes on tobacco products, raising tolls, and increasing vehicle registration fees.

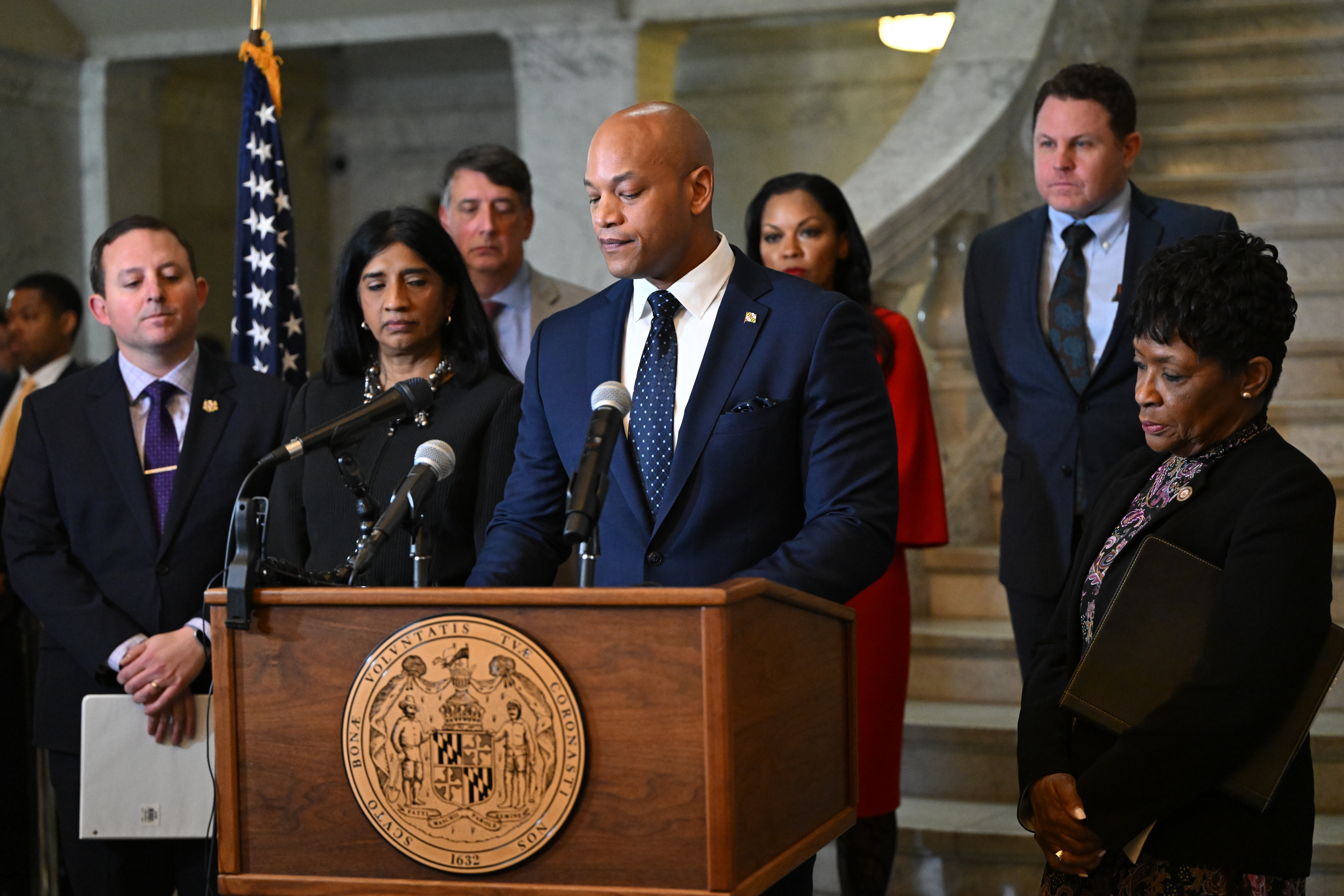
During the 2025 legislative session, Moore negotiated a compromise budget agreement with state legislative leaders that included $2.5 billion in cuts and $1 billion in new taxes.

In November 2024, after state analysts released a report showing that the state would soon enter a revenue deficit worse than the Great Recession, Moore reiterated a "high bar" for raising taxes and proposed temporarily pausing certain programs that were being implemented under the Blueprint for Maryland's Future. He also proposed shifting state investments toward growing areas of the state's economy—life sciences, information technology, and national defense—and coordinating economic development strategies with local governments. In January 2025, Moore proposed a budget that included $2 billion in spending cuts toward government programs that he described as "not effective nor sustainable", later signing an executive order aimed at reducing inefficiencies in state government. The proposed budget also contained an estimated $819 million in tax reforms, which included new income tax brackets for wealthy individuals and households, and a consolidation of income tax brackets for lower earners; an elimination of the state's inheritance tax and standard deductions; and a cut to the state's corporate tax rate while also requiring combined reporting for companies with subsidiaries. In March 2025, Moore told reporters that he did not support including a sugary drink tax or a "broad business-to-business tax" on services in his budget, but administration officials later told reporters that Moore would consider a package that also included taxes on services direct to consumers as well as businesses.

In March 2025, Moore announced a compromise spending plan negotiated with legislative leaders that would cut state spending by $2.5 billion, raise more than $1 billion in new taxes, and create a projected $350 million budget surplus for the 2027 fiscal year. The budget proposal would impose a 3% sales tax on data and IT services and a 2% capital gains tax, increase taxes on cannabis sales and sports betting, and includes "federal government spending triggers" that would activate in response to federal budget cuts. It also excludes several proposals from Moore's initial budget proposal, including a 75-cent delivery fee, a corporate tax cut, and the elimination of the inheritance tax. After President Donald Trump enacted a 25% tariff on car imports, the Senate opted to scale back a proposed increase to the state's vehicle excise tax and added a $5 per tire fee to pay for state transportation projects. Moore signed the compromise spending plan into law in May 2025.

In November 2025, after state analysts released a report showing that the state would face a $1.5 billion deficit in fiscal year 2027 as a result of tax changes from the One Big Beautiful Bill Act and increased costs for social programs, Moore ruled out any tax increases during the 2026 legislative session. In January 2026, he unveiled a budget proposal that would close the budget deficit through $1.8 billion in reductions through shifting funding away from the state's construction budget and clean energy initiatives, increasing cost sharing splits for retirement plans for workers in education, and implementing cost containment measures on the Developmental Disabilities Administration. At the same time, the budget proposal includes funding increases for public education and law enforcement. Moore signed the amended budget into law in April 2026.

== Education ==
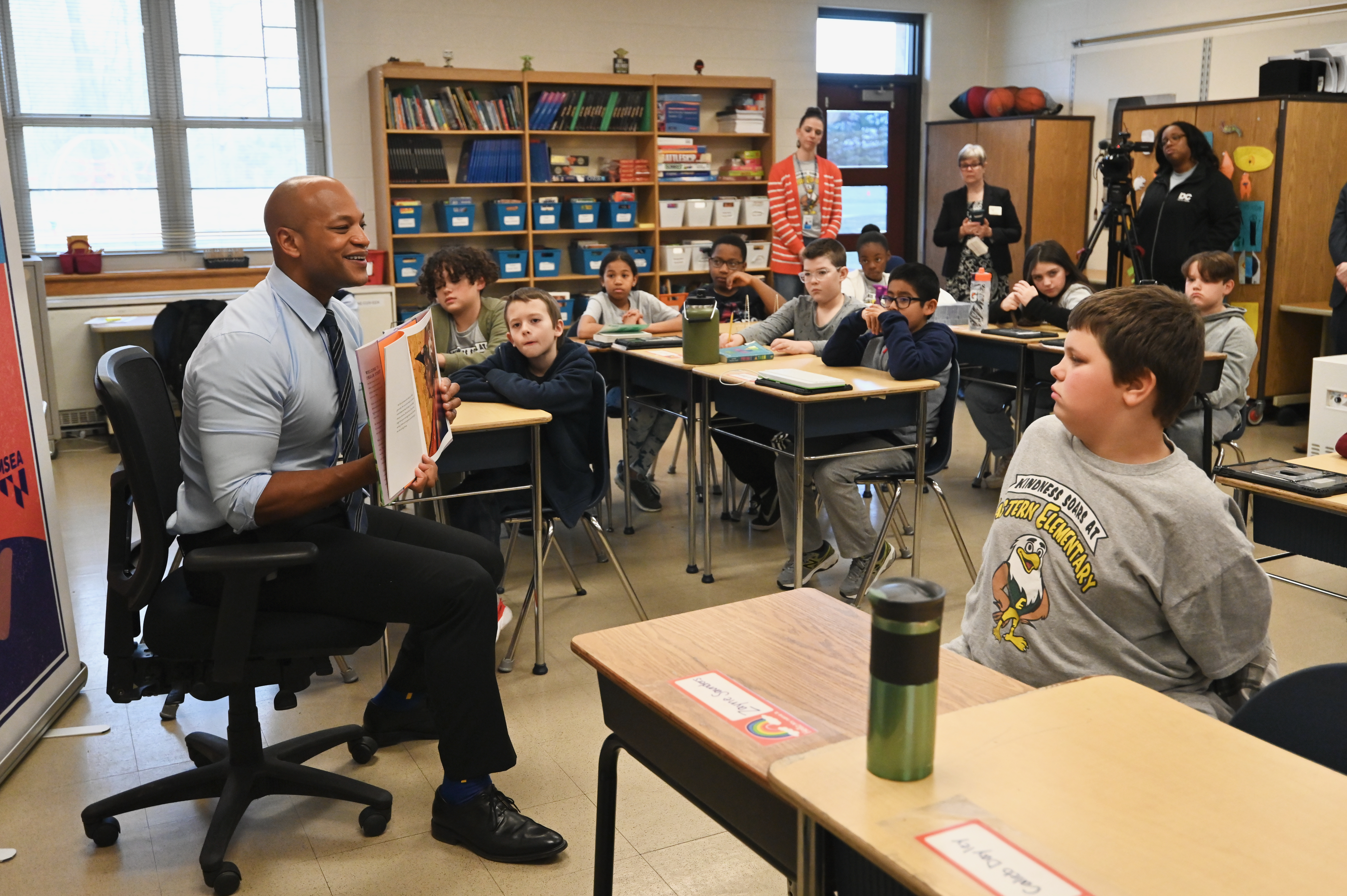
Moore reads to students at Eastern Elementary School in Hagerstown, 2023

=== Blueprint for Maryland's Future ===
Moore supports the Blueprint for Maryland's Future reform effort, testifying before the state legislature to urge its passage. During his 2022 gubernatorial campaign, he said that he would "work closely with local governments to make sure they are on board with their commitments to the Blueprint". In September 2022, Moore said he would institute universal pre-K and apprenticeship and trade programs in schools, and promised increases for school construction, educator wages, after-school programs, tutoring, child care, and early childhood education. In his first budget in January 2023, Moore proposed allocating $500 million toward funding the Blueprint, which was later increased to $900 million by state legislators.

In December 2024, after state financial officials determined that the state would face a $2.7 billion deficit during the 2026 fiscal year, Moore proposed scaling back parts of the Blueprint reform package and adjusting state formulas that determine how much funding state and local governments dedicate to education. At the same time, Moore said that he would keep intact policies to expand pre-kindergarten programs, tutoring, and early literacy programs, and suggested that the state should focus mainly on hiring and retaining teachers. During the 2025 legislative session, Moore introduced the Excellence in Maryland Public Schools Act, which proposed temporary pauses on plans under the Blueprint to gradually give teachers more "collaborative time" to work on professional development and planning outside of the classroom, reduce funding for programs to support students learning English, and freeze funding for community schools for two years. These proposed changes would cut nearly one-fifth of new funding provided under the Blueprint reforms and have the most impact on students living in poverty and immigrant students. Moore's proposed Blueprint reforms were largely rejected by lawmakers, who amended Moore's bill to reinstate funding for community schools and students learning English, but implemented a three-year delay on collaborative time implementation plans. Moore signed the Excellence in Maryland Public Schools Act into law in May 2025.

=== Book bans ===
In May 2023, during a commencement speech at Morehouse College, Moore criticized efforts to ban books and restrict curriculum in schools, suggesting that politicians who sought to "silence or rewrite the history of Black and brown people are actually afraid of people understanding their power". In April 2024, Moore signed into law the Freedom to Read Act, which prohibits public and school libraries from banning books based on partisan, ideological, or religious reasons, or based an author's origin, background, or views.

=== Charter schools ===
Moore does not support the expansion of charter schools, saying that he wants to focus on improving public school districts, but wants to ensure accountability for current charters. In his first budget, in January 2023, Moore cut funding for the state's Broadening Options and Opportunities for Students Today (BOOST) program to provide scholarships to students attending charter schools by $2 million, and introduced new eligibility limits for current BOOST students and their siblings. In an interview with Jewish Insider, Moore said he intended to get rid of the BOOST program in a few years, adding, "The focus that I have, the focus that our administration is going to have, is making sure that we are creating and developing world-class public schools for our students." The budget was amended to reduce these cuts by $1 million in March 2023, and signed into law in April 2023. Moore maintained funding for the BOOST program in his 2024 budget.

=== Higher education ===
During his 2022 gubernatorial campaign, Moore called a plan to cancel up to $20,000 in federal student loan debt a "good first step" and said he would push the Biden administration to forgive more federal student debt if elected governor. In June 2023, Moore opposed the U.S. Supreme Court's ruling in Students for Fair Admissions v. Harvard, which held that race-based affirmative action in college admissions violated the Equal Protection Clause, calling it a "misguided ruling". In April 2024, Moore signed into law a bill banning legacy admissions at Maryland colleges and universities.

In October 2026, following a media outcry caused by the 2024 Cornell University rape allegations, Moore issued a directive ordering the Maryland Higher Education Commission to develop recommendations for improving campus sexual assault policies within 90 days.

=== Service year option ===
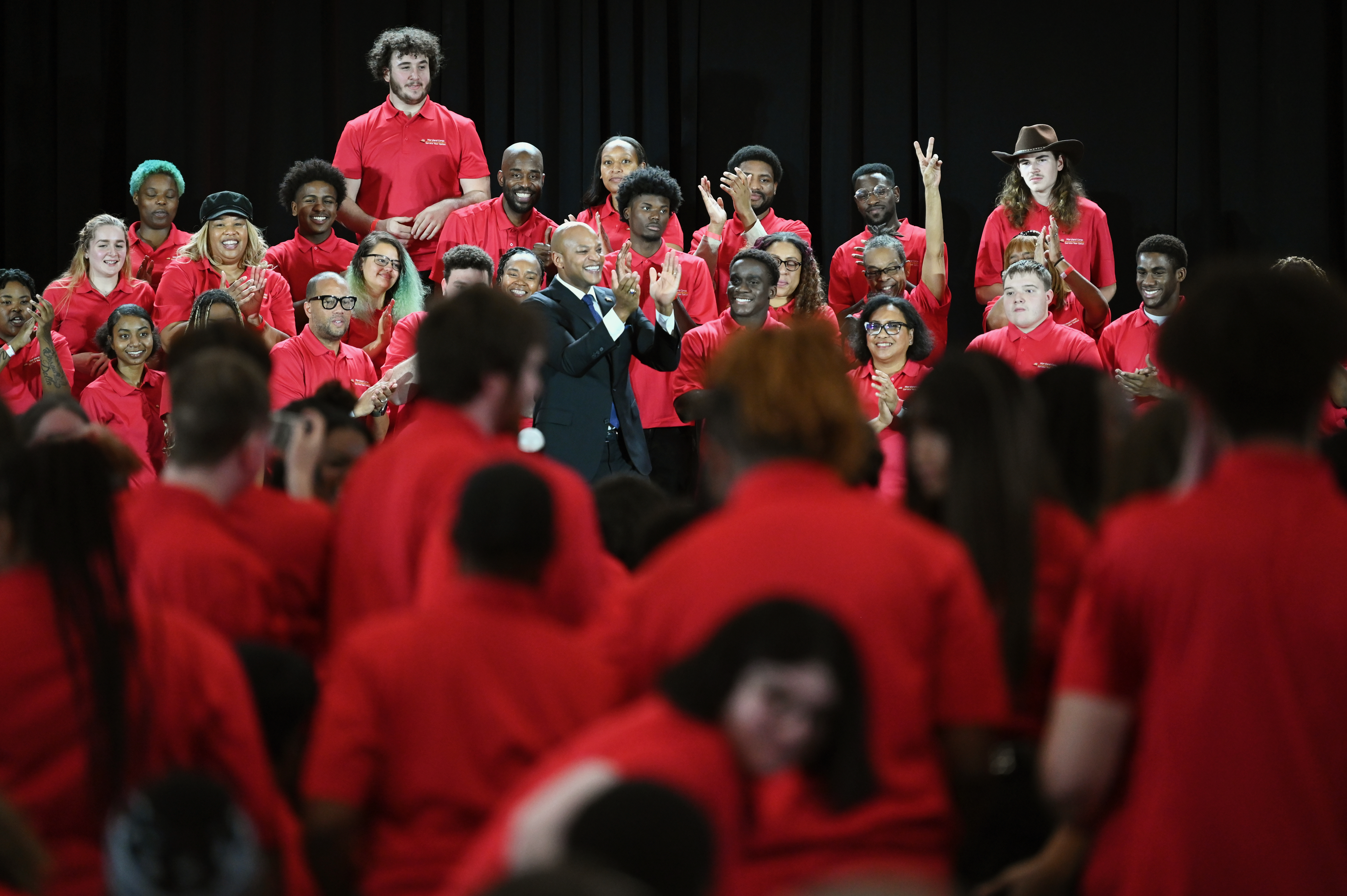
Moore speaks at the launch of the Service Year Option program, 2023

Moore supports creating a "service year option" in schools, which would enable high school graduates to do a gap year "in exchange for job training, mentorship, and other support including compensatory tuition at a state college or university." On January 19, 2023, Moore signed an executive order creating the Maryland Department of Service and Civic Innovation, a cabinet-level agency responsible for establishing a service-year option for all high school graduates. In February, he introduced the SERVE Act to create the "service year option program", which would pay young people $15 per hour for at least 30 hours a week for work in service to the community. The SERVE Act was signed into law in April 2023, and the service year program launched with 280 participating students in October 2023. The program expanded to include 600 participating students in its second year.

== Environment and energy ==
=== Chesapeake Bay restoration ===
Moore said he would support Chesapeake Bay restoration efforts by promoting "accountability and enforcement" in Maryland, as well as in neighboring states, use federal funds to upgrade water and wastewater systems, and by increasing the number of environmental inspectors. In October 2022, he told Lancaster Farming that he would develop a plan to accelerate projects to improve water quality and cut carbon emissions in his administration's first 100 days, and supported the restoration of the state's Chesapeake Bay Restoration Fund. In July 2023, Moore signed executive orders to refocus cleanup efforts onto shallow areas of the bay and to establish the Council on the Chesapeake and Coastal Bays to research state policy on oyster restoration and harvesting.

From October 2023 to December 2025, Moore served as the chair of the Chesapeake Executive Council. During the 2025 legislative session, Moore introduced the Bay Legacy Act, which would promote regenerative farming practices on public lands, increase support for agricultural and oyster farmers, and improve the Maryland Department of Natural Resources's water quality monitoring methods. The Bay Legacy Act passed and was signed into law by Moore in May 2025. In December 2025, Moore, Delaware Governor Matt Meyer, Virginia Governor Glenn Youngkin, and Pennsylvania Governor Josh Shapiro approved a new cleanup plan that extended the Chesapeake Bay restoration effort to 2040 and includes commitments to reducing sediment pollution to the Bay.

In October 2025, Moore announced an agreement between the state and Constellation Energy that would allow the Conowingo Dam to continue operations for another 50 years, but required the company to spend $341 million on a series of renovations to support fish migration through the damn and limit pollution flowing through it to the lower Susquehanna River and the Chesapeake Bay.

=== Data centers ===
In October 2023, Moore criticized the Maryland Public Service Commission for unanimously rejecting Aligned Data Centers's request to install 168 three-megawatt diesel generators at a data center it hoped to build in Frederick County. During the 2024 legislative session, he introduced legislation that exempts these kinds of generators from environmental review processes; after facing opposition from the Maryland League of Conservation Voters, the bill was amended to require 15% of all tax revenues collected from data center operations to go toward the state's clean energy fund. The bill passed and was signed into law by Moore.

In May 2025, Moore vetoed legislation to study the energy and environmental consequences of data centers in Maryland, which was overriden by lawmakers in December 2025. In October 2025, TeraWulf CEO Paul Prager met with Moore and several top Moore administration officials to discuss a proposal to buy the old Morgantown Generating Station and reboot it to power what could be Maryland's largest data center. In December 2025, the Moore administration sent a one-page letter to TeraWulf executives offering expedited approvals for the proposed data center, including those needed for natural gas pipelines. After The Baltimore Banner reported on this letter in June 2026, Moore's office downplayed his administration's support for natural gas connections to the contaminated site, saying that the state's endorsement applied strictly to the environmental cleanup at Morgantown and that the TeraWulf project "is not receiving and will not receive any special treatment or consideration". During the 2026 legislative session, the Moore administration defended the state's dta center tax exemption and opposed legislation to establish new reporting requirements for data center developers.

In September 2026, Moore said he would sign a data center moratorium if passed by the Maryland General Assembly. He later proposed a series of regulations on the artificial intelligence industry, signed an executive order setting standards for reviewing new data center projects, and called for a repeal of the state's data center tax credit.

=== Electric vehicles ===
In February 2023, Moore introduced the Clean Transportation and Energy Act, which increases incentives for people and businesses looking to purchase electric trucks and charging stations. In March 2023, he said he supported adopting California's Advanced Clean Cars II (ACC II) regulation, which would phase out the sale of gas-powered cars in the state by 2035. In April 2023, he signed the Clean Transportation and Energy Act and several other bills aimed at strengthening the state's offshore wind energy industry into law. In August 2023, Moore said he supported a proposal by then-Governor Hogan to delay emissions testing on new cars from three to six years—despite initially withdrawing the proposal earlier in his term due to equity concerns—after the Maryland Motor Vehicle Administration found that the change would have no severe impacts on equity. In April 2025, as Maryland electric vehicle sales continued to lag behind the state's goals, Moore signed an executive order to delay fines against car companies that fail to comply with the state's electric vehicle mandates.

=== Energy generation ===
In April 2022, Moore signed a Chesapeake Climate Action Network pledge to support legislation to get Maryland to use 100 percent carbon-free electricity by 2035 and to remove trash incineration from the state's "clean energy" classification. In March 2023, he set a goal of achieving 8.5 gigawatts of wind power generation in the state by 2031, which was later codified after he signed the POWER Act in April 2023. In August 2025, Moore criticized the Trump administration's plans to revoke federal offshore wind permits for US Wind's proposed wind farm off the coast of Ocean City, Maryland, calling it "utterly shortsighted" and noting that the project was set to bring $1 billion in investments to the state.

Moore has criticized PJM Interconnection, the regional transmission organization that operates Maryland's power grid, arguing that its policies have delayed new clean energy projects at a time of increasing energy demand as a result of the AI boom. In November 2024, he expressed "grave concerns" with the Maryland Piedmont Reliability Project, a 70-mile power line proposed by PJM that would run from Frederick to Baltimore County to provide power to data centers in Maryland and Virginia, saying that the project lacked community input and effective communication about its impacts. In December 2025, Moore signed an executive order directing the Maryland Energy Administration to petition the Maryland Public Service Commission to assess whether current practices protect ratepayers from unexpected costs and to petition owners to consider advanced transmission technologies to increase the capacity and efficiency of existing grid infrastructure prior to earning approval for new power line construction. In January 2026, he endorsed a Trump administration proposal to slow energy price increases in the northeast United States through reforms to the region's power grid.

During the 2025 legislative session, Moore introduced the ENERGIZE Maryland Act, which would expand nuclear power and other clean energy sources in the state. The ENERGIZE Act failed to pass, though many of its provisions—including those to speed up the process for procuring new nuclear energy—were added to the Next Generation Energy Act, which Moore signed into law in May 2025. Moore also signed into law the Renewable Energy Certainty Act, which creates statewide standards for commercial solar farms in Maryland and overturns local zoning laws that restricted where solar farms could be built. He vetoed a bill to study the cost of climate change in Maryland, though he allocated nearly $500,000 in funding for the same study in December 2025.

During the 2026 legislative session, Moore introduced the Lower Bills and Local Power Act, which would provide $70 million in financing to new energy generation projects, provide $100 million in rebates to utility customers, and close a loophole that allows Maryland utilities to profit from their participation in the PJM Interconnection. He also proposed draining $725 million from the Strategic Energy Investment Fund, the state's clean energy fund, to close the state's $1.4 billion budget deficit. In March 2026, Moore and Democratic legislative leaders announced the Utility RELIEF Act, a legislative package aimed at lowering electricity costs through a series of reforms, such as establishing a competitive bidding program for clean energy projects, setting limits on costs that utilities could pass onto customers, and increasing oversight of utility companies. Moore signed the Utility RELIEF Act into law in May 2026.

In June 2026, Moore criticized efforts by the second Trump administration to use federal funding to restart the Warrior Run Generating Station coal plant, saying that the funds should be spent on clean energy instead of "subsidizing energy sources of the last century".

=== Greenhouse gas emissions ===
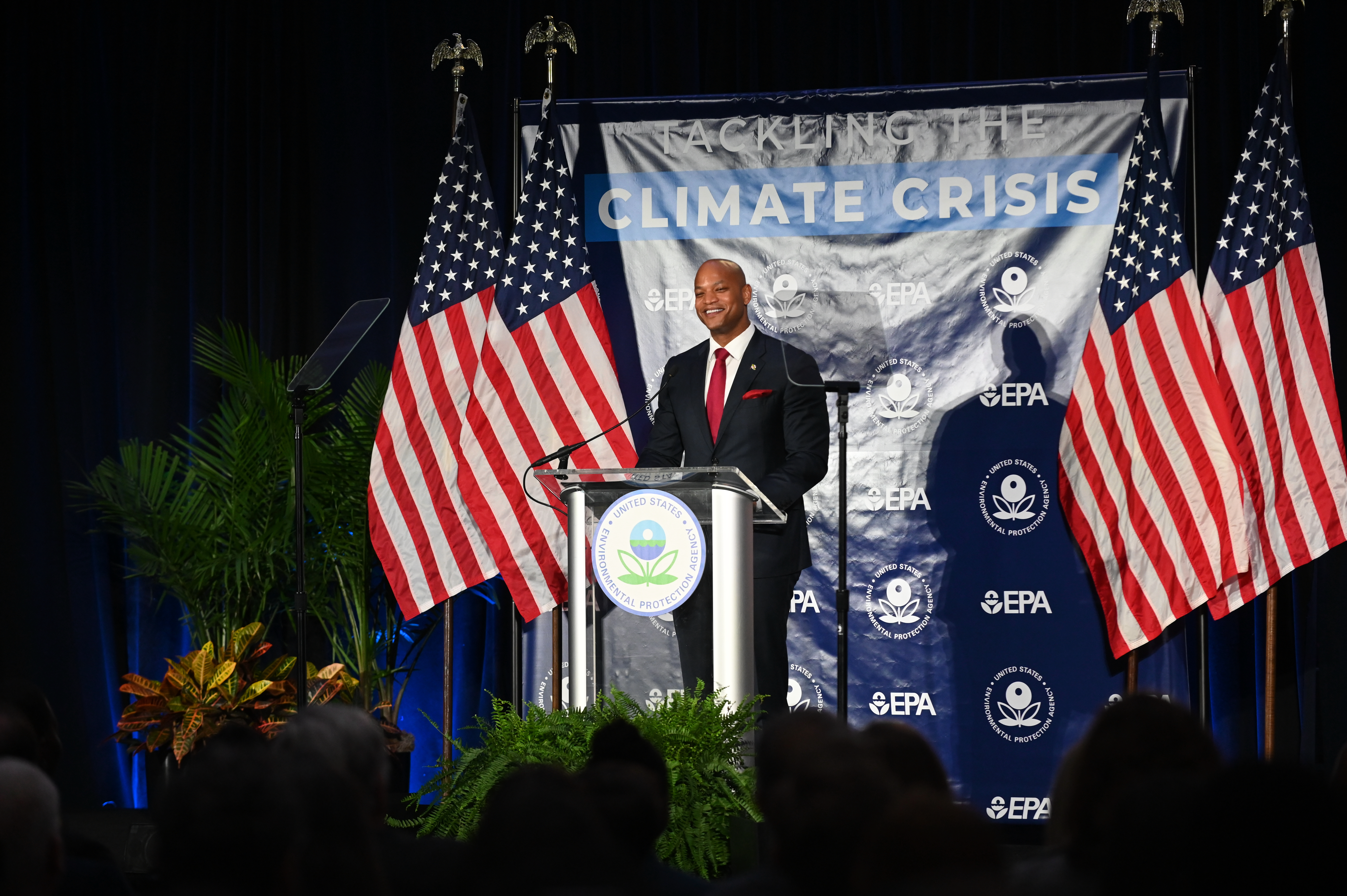
Moore speaks at an Environmental Protection Agency press conference on carbon emissions, 2023

During his 2022 gubernatorial campaign, Moore criticized the Hogan administration for a "failure of executive leadership" on fighting climate change. He supports the renewable energy goals set by the state's Clean Energy Jobs Act of 2019, which called for a 50% reduction in greenhouse gas emissions and an electrification of the state's vehicle fleet by 2030, and has said the state should pursue "more ambitious goals" beyond carbon neutrality. He also proposed regulations to achieve 100% clean energy use by 2035 and net zero carbon emissions by 2045, electrify the state's fleet, and prioritize environmental-justice funding. Moore also said that he would establish a "cap-and-invest" program in Maryland, which would tax polluters to provide revenue for clean energy infrastructure and relief in communities of color, and promised to hire a "climate czar" in his administration, whom he appointed in November 2023.

In July 2025, Moore signed an executive order ordering his administration to utilize the Maryland Department of the Environment's EnviroScreen tool, which allows users to view data on pollution burdens and health metrics by census tract, to inform their policy work and agency decisions. The order also created an interagency advisory council to develop environmental justice strategic plans in collaboration with thirteen state agencies and contained provisions calling on state agencies to accelerate their efforts in removing barriers preventing farmers from accessing land and financing.

== Health and public safety ==
=== Crime ===
Moore has blamed his predecessor, Governor Larry Hogan, for increased violent crime in Maryland, citing his lack of collaboration between his administration and local leaders and legislators. During his 2022 gubernatorial campaign, he called on Hogan to target state resources toward preventing gun violence in Baltimore and campaigned on addressing crime in the city through better cooperation between the city and state, and to leverage these relationships on the federal level to bring more resources into the city. In January 2023, Moore told CBS News that he supported a bill that would prohibit charging juveniles with felony murder.

In January 2023, following the release of videos capturing the arrest and police assault of Tyre Nichols, Moore condemned the brutality of the police and thanked the United States Department of Justice for opening an investigation into Nichols's death. He later said in an interview that Nichols's death only highlighted the need to tackle injustice head-on.

In February 2023, Moore pledged $11 million in funding for the Maryland Coordination and Analysis Center, an agency that serves as a data-sharing platform for law enforcement officials across the state. He also said that his administration would not use a quota system for traffic stops and arrests after a Baltimore Banner investigation found that Maryland State Police supervisors previously demanded troopers hit targets for traffic stops and arrests. In June 2023, Moore released $5 million in funding from the American Rescue Plan Act of 2021 toward youth intervention efforts to deter violent crime around the state.

In July 2023, following mass shootings in Baltimore and Salisbury that left a combined three dead and 34 injured, Moore released a statement expressing his condolences and spoke in support of gun violence prevention efforts in Baltimore. He ruled out calls to form a special session to pass legislation to address gun violence, saying it was not needed, but said he supported increased policing and longer sentences for repeat violent offenders. In January 2024, Moore introduced three bills aimed at improving public safety, including one to create apprenticeships in public safety to increase law enforcement retention and another to compensate victims of crime. He also expressed support for lengthening probation periods for violent juvenile offenders and increasing the severity for gun crimes from misdemeanors to felonies, and another bill to restrict sex offenders' ability to earn "good time" credits that reduce their sentence following the murder of Pava LaPere. He also supported a bill that would allow minors to be charged with certain crimes and enable courts to extend probation limits for juveniles. Moore signed all three bills into law in May 2024.

In October 2024, after a Howard High School student with a prior criminal record was charged with first-degree murder, Moore ordered a review of how state agencies share information about public school students with violent criminal records.

During the 2025 legislative session, Moore introduced the Expungement Reform Act, a bill that would expand criminal record expungement options for violations of parole and probation. He also expressed support for state efforts aimed at "supporting an elevating our men and boys" by removing barriers that keep men out of the workforce, including those returning from incarceration. In April 2025, Moore signed the Expungement Reform Act and the Second Look Act—which allows people incarcerated for at least 20 years for crimes they committed between the ages of 18 and 25 to petition for a reduced sentence—into law.

In September 2025, Moore announced that his administration would close the Maryland Correctional Institution - Jessup and transfer prisoners held there to other prisons in the state, saying that the facility would've needed $200 million in renovations to continue operations. In January 2026, he proposed a pause on funding for the construction of the Baltimore Therapeutic Treatment Center, a new jail in Baltimore designed for people who have substance use issues and are facing criminal charges.

In May 2026, Moore signed into law the Youth Charging Reform Act, which removes first-degree assault and several handgun offenses from the list of offenses that result in minors being automatically charged as adults.

In October 2026, Moore ordered the Maryland Department of Juvenile Services to implement a piloto program for youth-invlved car thefts in Baltimore and Montgomery County following a fatal crash involving a motorist and a stolen car driven by a 12-year-old.

=== Gun control ===
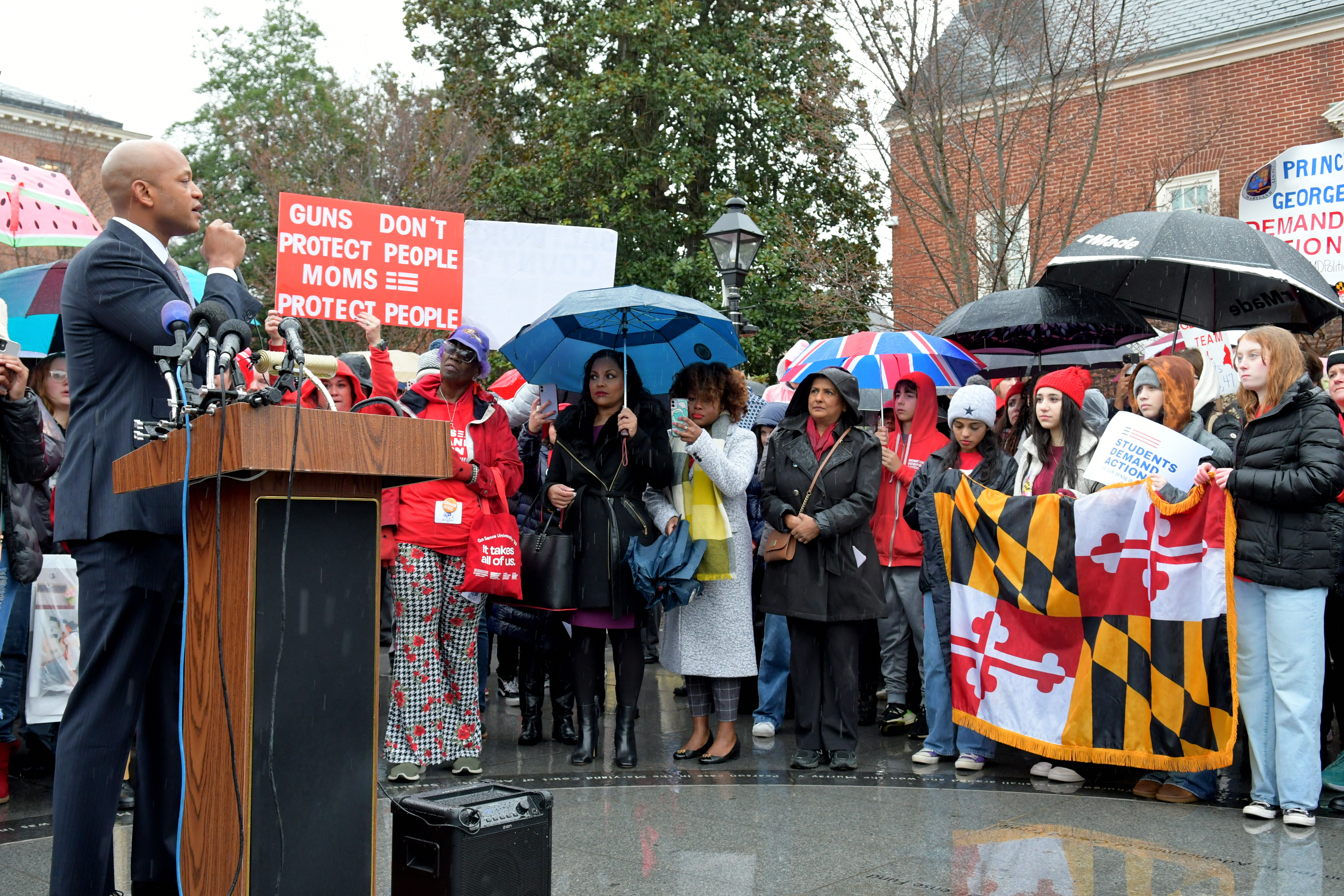
Moore speaks at a Moms Demand Action rally in Annapolis, 2023

In 2022, Moore supported a bill to ban the possession and sale of privately made firearms in Maryland. He supports creating a firearms database to help law enforcement track guns used in crimes. In June 2022, Moore condemned the Supreme Court's ruling in New York State Rifle & Pistol Association, Inc. v. Bruen, calling it a "misguided and dangerous decision." He also opposed Governor Hogan's decision to suspend the state's "good and substantial reason" standard for obtaining a concealed carry permit following the ruling.

In January 2023, Moore attended a Moms Demand Action rally in Annapolis, Maryland, where he said he would support the Gun Safety Act of 2023. The bill would increase the requirements and fees to obtain a handgun permit, strengthen safe storage requirements, and prohibit gun owners from carrying guns near schools, government property, construction areas, or entertainment venues, and from entering someone's property while carrying a firearm unless given permission by the owner. Moore signed the bill into law on May 16, 2023. That same day, the National Rifle Association of America (NRA) filed a lawsuit in federal court challenging the law's location restrictions. In September 2023, two days before the law was set to go into effect, U.S. District Judge George L. Russell III blocked sections of the bill restricting open carry near public demonstrations and private buildings, but upheld the remainder of the bill.

In November 2023, Moore expressed disappointment with a Fourth Circuit Court of Appeals ruling that struck down a provision of the state's Firearm Safety Act of 2013 that required handgun owners to obtain a "handgun qualification license" to buy a handgun.

In May 2024, Moore signed into law a bill that would allow the attorney general of Maryland to sue firearms manufacturers and local gun dealerships and another to establish the Center for Firearm Violence Prevention and Intervention, which would oversee collaboration between state agencies, hospitals, and community-based violence intervention programs to decrease violent crimes.

In May 2026, Moore signed innto law a bill that would ban the sale or manufacture of semi-automatic pistols that can be converted into a machine gun with the installation of a Glock switch.

=== Health care ===
In an interview with The Daily Record before becoming governor, Moore expressed support for the End-of-Life Options Act, which would allow terminally ill adults to request medical aid in dying. As of March 2025, bills to allow this procedure have stalled in the General Assembly because of a lack of support in the Maryland Senate.

In January 2023, Moore proposed providing members of the Maryland National Guard with free health and dental care; legislators later amended the bill to cap monthly reimbursements at $60 a month, and it was signed into law by Moore in May 2023. Also in May 2023, he signed into law the Josh Siems Act, a bill that would require emergency rooms to include fentanyl testing in toxicology screens.

In May 2024, Moore signed into law the Access to Care Act, which would allow Maryland residents to purchase individual private health care plans through the Maryland Health Benefit Exchange regardless of immigration status.

During the 2025 legislative session, Moore proposed $200 million in cuts to the Developmental Disabilities Administration (DDA) to help offset a $3 billion budget deficit. Following pushback from disability advocates, state officials said that they had found a way to restore about 94% of the proposed budget cuts using unspent fund balance and federal assistance, and agreed to a three-month delay toward $73 million in DDA cuts that were set to go into effect in April 2025. During the 2026 legislative session, Moore proposed an additional $150 million in cuts to the DDA as well as a $500,000 cap on the total amount of state funding a single person with a DDA waiver could receive in a year for their health needs. The Maryland Senate reduced these cuts to $126 million and rejected the health services cap, but retained several other cost containment measures proposed by Moore.

In May 2025, Moore signed into law a bill requiring insurers to cover vaccinations recommended by the Advisory Committee on Immunization Practices as of December 2024. In September 2025, amid efforts by Health and Human Services Secretary Robert F. Kennedy Jr. to restrict access to vaccines, Maryland joined the Northeast Public Health Collaborative, a coalition of states to coordinate public health guidelines separate from the Centers for Disease Control and Prevention (CDC). During the 2026 legislative session, Moore introduced a bill that would give the Maryland Secretary of Health the ability to issue vaccine recommendations tied to guidance from major medical associations and other states. The bill passed and was signed into law by Moore in April 2026.

In October 2026, Moore endorsed legislation that would increase to 25 the number of prescription drugs the state could set upper payment limits on.

=== Policing ===
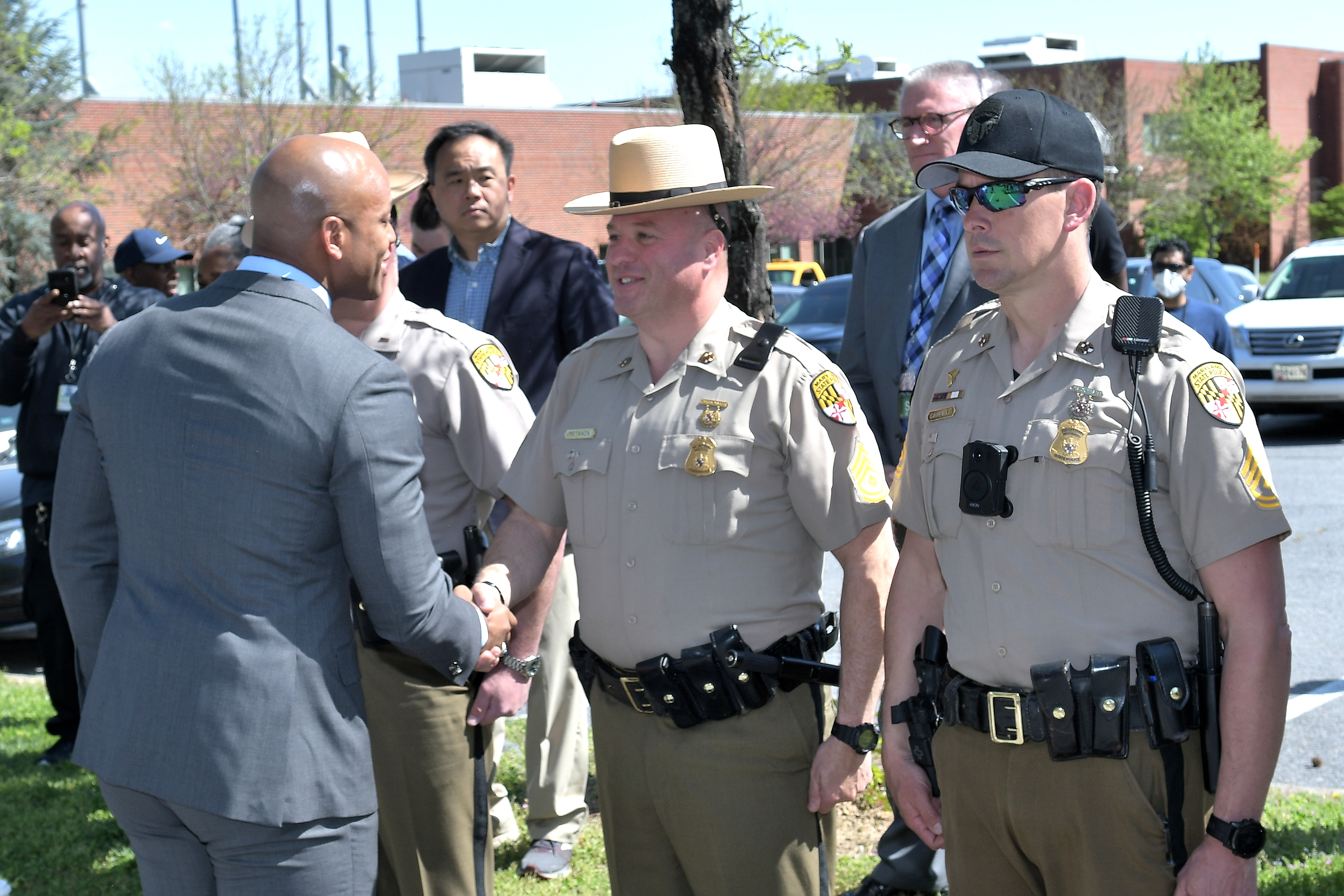
Moore greeting police officers in Hanover, Maryland, 2023

Moore supports hiring more probation and parole officers, pursuing police misconduct allegations, and increasing resources for law enforcement agencies.

During his 2022 gubernatorial campaign, he unveiled a public safety plan that includes improving offender services, improving police diversity, and supporting and funding community-based policing and violence intervention programs. He also said that he "believes in policing with maximum accountability and appropriate intensity", and would provide funding for community-based violence intervention programs to address violent crime. In an interview with MSNBC on August 30, 2022, Moore said that he would tackle crime in Baltimore by investing in violence intervention programs like Safe Streets and We Our Us. In September 2022, Moore said he would use the "bully pulpit" of the governor's office to help recruit officers and would give the state's Fraternal Order of Police a seat at the table, telling The Washington Post, "I don't think that you can be serious about actually implementing reforms if the agencies that have to be reformed are not part of the process".

In August 2025, Moore criticized Trump's decision to mobilize the National Guard in Washington, D.C. as "deeply dangerous", characterizing it as a distraction from his policies and other political problems. He also said that he would not authorize the deployment of the Maryland National Guard to police cities in Maryland and later invited Trump to walk the streets of Baltimore to see the city's public safety improvements firsthand. In September 2025, facing threats from Trump to deploy the National Guard in Baltimore, Moore and Baltimore mayor Brandon Scott announced plans to increase partnership between the Baltimore Police Department, Maryland State Police, and Maryland Transportation Authority Police in high-risk areas of the city. In October 2025, Moore signed onto an amicus brief supporting a legal challenge against Trump's deployment of the National Guard for civil law enforcement in various U.S. cities.

== Housing and development ==
As governor, Moore is a member of the Maryland Board of Public Works—a constitutionally appointed body that oversees many aspects of the state's finances—along with the comptroller and the state treasurer. During his first board meeting in January 2023, Moore said the state would work to include more diverse businesses in state contracts.

=== FBI headquarters ===
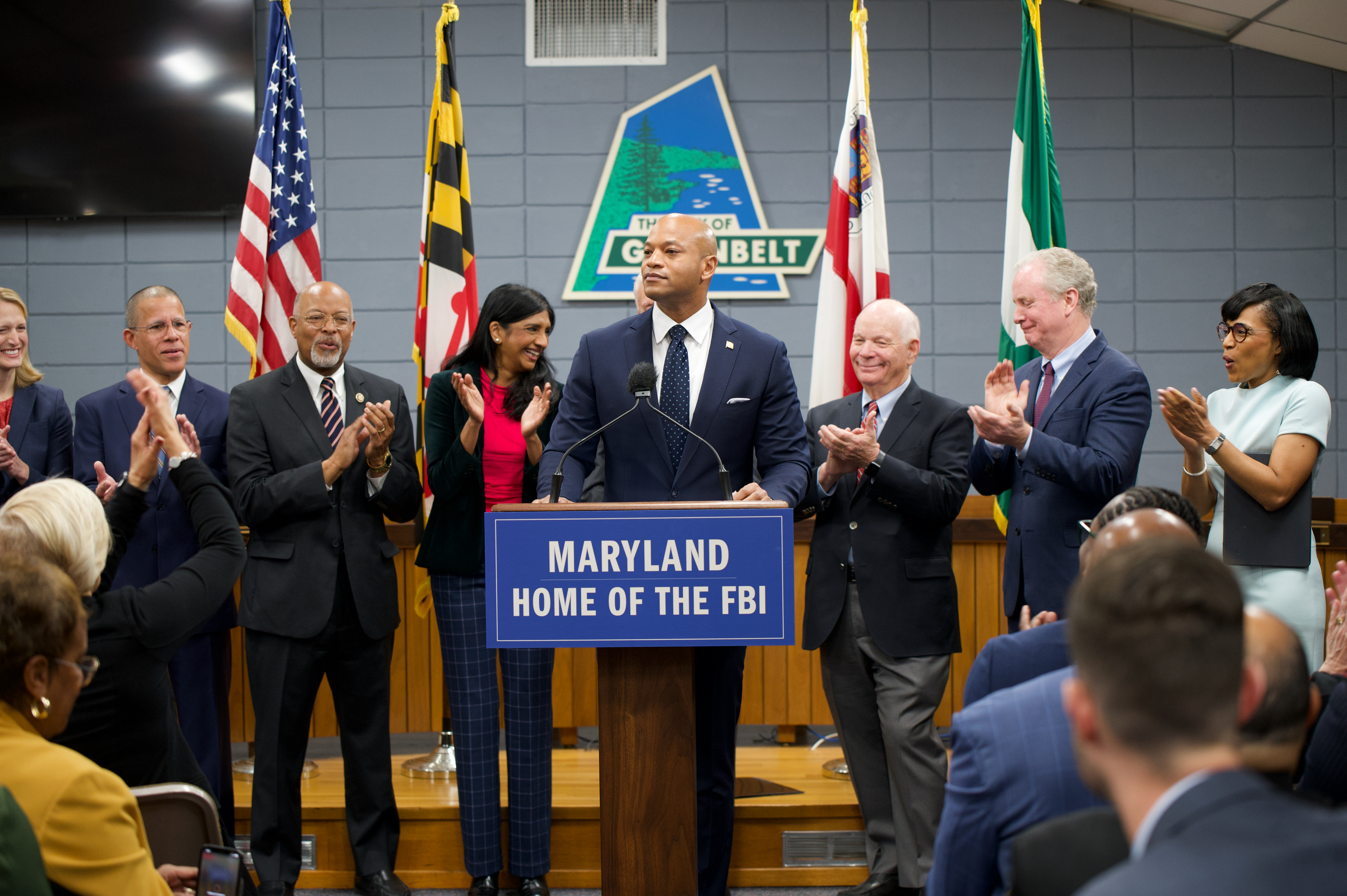
Moore and Prince George's County officials celebrate the selection of Greenbelt for the FBI's new headquarters, November 2023

Moore supports relocating the Federal Bureau of Investigation's headquarters to Prince George's County, describing it as a "personal priority" and a matter of equity. In March 2023, Moore joined Democratic members of Maryland's congressional delegation and Prince George's County Executive Angela Alsobrooks in co-signing a letter to President Joe Biden asking him to get involved in the FBI's headquarters selection process.

In November 2023, the General Services Administration announced that it would locate the FBI's new headquarters in Greenbelt, Maryland. In March 2025, however, President Donald Trump blocked the FBI's move to Maryland, saying that the agency should be located in Washington, D.C., as opposed to "liberal" Maryland. In July 2025, after Trump said that he wanted the new FBI headquarters to be the Ronald Reagan Building and International Trade Center in Washington, D.C., Moore signed onto a letter saying that he and other Maryland lawmakers would "be fighting back against this proposal with every tool we have". He later supported a lawsuit against the Trump administration for interfering in the FBI's relocation. In August 2026, U.S. District Court judge Theodore D. Chuang blocked the Trump administration from moving the FBI headquarters to Washington, D.C.

=== Housing ===
Moore has described himself as a "YIMBY". He supports the right to counsel in eviction cases, saying that providing tenants with access to counsel is "the just thing to do and it is the right thing to do". On his campaign website, Moore says he would address the "unfair appraisal values in historically redlined neighborhoods" and provide increased funding for the Maryland Department of Housing and Community Development. During a town hall in August 2023, Moore suggested that nonprofits could be used to help lower housing costs in addition to increasing the state's affordable housing inventory and supporting current homeowners.

In January 2024, Moore introduced bills to increase federal funding and reducing barriers for affordable housing projects in the state, especially those around commuter rail stations, as well as legislation establishing a "Tenant's Bill of Rights" and providing additional protections to renters against evictions. While Moore's tenant protections bills passed the legislature unchanged, legislators opted to weaken the Housing Expansion and Affordability Act by removing provisions that would block jurisdictions from using an adequate public facilities ordinance to block the construction of affordable housing and modifying the qualifications needed for affordable housing projects to be eligible for density bonuses.

In October 2024, Moore signed an executive order aimed at removing 5,000 of Baltimore's 13,000 vacant homes within five years. In October 2026, he pledged that Baltimore would have zero vacant homes within the next 12 years.

During the 2025 legislative session, Moore introduced the Housing for Jobs Act, a bill that would require local governments to automatically approve new housing developments in areas where there are 1.5 jobs for every available housing unit. After the Maryland Association of Counties expressed concerns with the bill, House lawmakers rewrote the bill that requires the state's housing secretary to set a 10-year target for housing production in the state and creates a commission to study the state's housing crisis and develop recommendations on how to address the lack of affordable housing in the state. However, this version of the bill failed to pass the General Assembly. In August 2025, Moore signed an executive order incentivizing the Maryland Department of General Services and the Maryland Department of Transportation to use their available land for housing and accelerate land awards to developers, creates housing production targets for Maryland counties, and instructs all state agencies that use housing-related permits to draft and implement plans to speed up and increase transparency around permit application processing.

In January 2026, Moore said he would support three bills to spur construction and increase housing in Maryland, including proposals to encourage mixed-use development projects on state-owned land at train stations and give Maryland developers "early vesting", which would lock in a project's ground rules for five years. The Maryland Housing Certainty Act and Maryland Transit and Housing Opportunity Act both passed, but Moore's third bill, the Starter and Silver Homes Act, failed to advance out of committee. Moore signed the two housing bills into law in May 2026.

In October 2026, Moore signed an executive order aimed at simplifying the permitting process and allowing for cost-efficient construction techniques in building affordable housing.

=== Sports venues ===
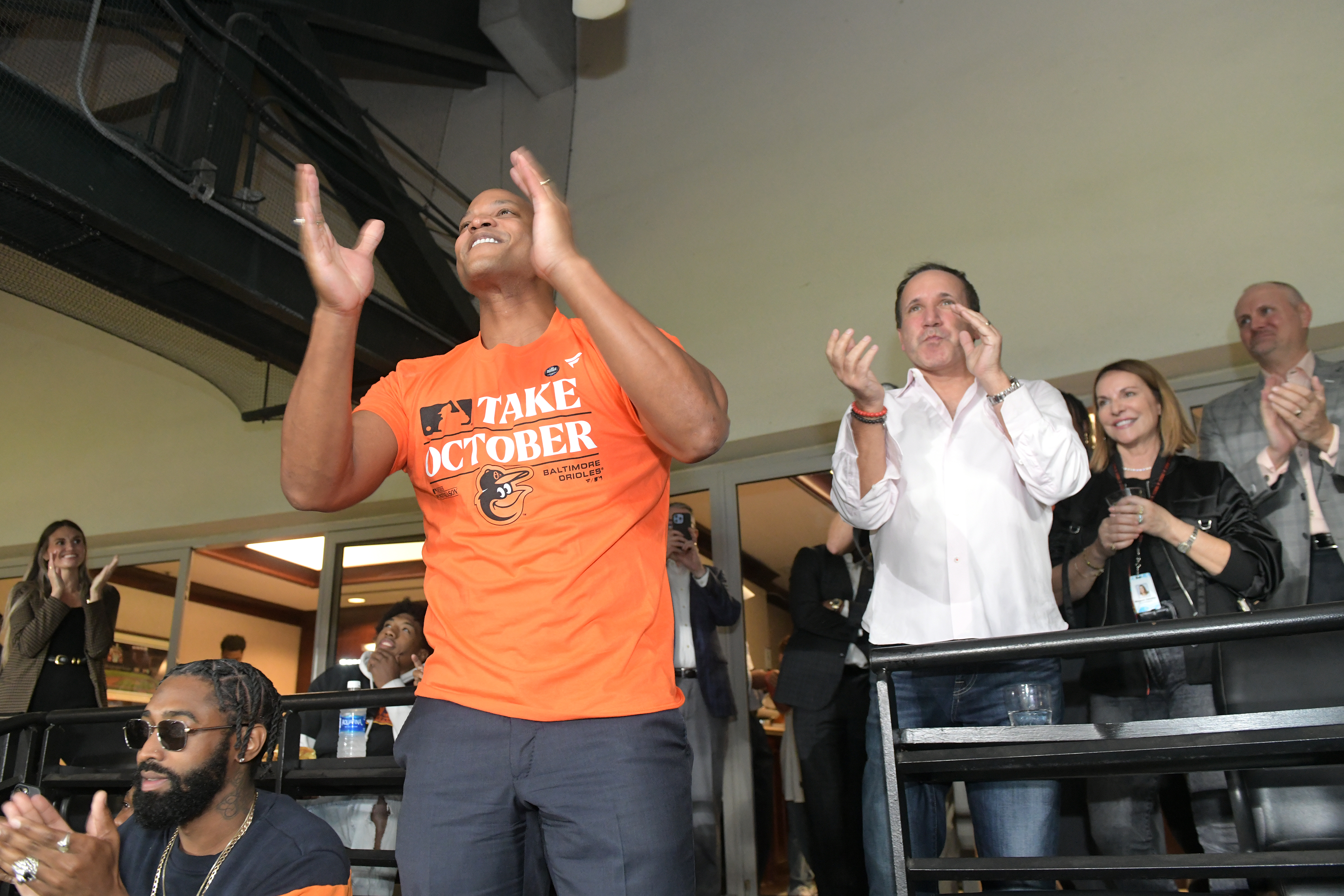
Moore and Orioles CEO John P. Angelos announcing a memorandum of understanding to extend the Baltimore Orioles's stadium lease, September 2023

In February 2023, Moore announced a $600 million, five-year partnership with the Baltimore Orioles to develop properties around Camden Yards. In September 2023, he and Orioles CEO John P. Angelos announced a memorandum of understanding that would extend the team's lease by 30 years, open development rights inside the park to private developers, and give the Orioles control over stadium operations and maintenance. The stadium lease was finalized in December 2023, but an agreement on the team's ground lease and redevelopment plan was postponed until 2027 following concerns from Senate President Bill Ferguson. Orioles CEO David Rubenstein later wrote in his book, Inside the Owner’s Box, that he wanted to focus on the roster and ongoing ballpark upgrades before pursuing real estate development around Camden Yards. In September 2026, Rubenstein engaged real estate firm Seregh to begin a "multiyear effort to try to redevelop the immediate area around Camden Yards".

Moore supported keeping the Washington Commanders, who are contractually obligated to play at Northwest Stadium until September 2027, in Maryland. He initially said that he would not support spending state funds to keep the Commanders in Maryland, but later reiterated that he supported spending some taxpayer money on a new Commanders football stadium "if we know there's going to be a significant societal return on the investment". In November 2024, Moore opposed a federal bill to give Washington, D.C. greater control of the Robert F. Kennedy Memorial Stadium, which would potentially allow the Commanders to move there in 2027, saying that the bill was "not in the best interest of the American taxpayer". After this bill passed Congress in December 2024, Moore and Washington Commanders owner Josh Harris signed a memorandum of understanding that the team would be responsible for developing the Northwest Stadium site if it moves to RFK Stadium. On April 28, 2025, Harris announced that the team would be building a New Stadium at RFK Campus to open in 2030.

In May 2024, Moore signed into law a bill that would transfer ownership of the Pimlico Race Course to the Maryland Thoroughbred Racetrack Operating Authority, allowing for a state-funded, multi-million dollar renovation project of the race course's track to begin and for the construction of a new training center at a separate location. The bill would also consolidate thoroughbred racing in Maryland to Pimlico and have the Maryland state government assume responsibility over racing operations at the course by next year. In June 2026, the State of Maryland acquired the intellectual property rights of the Preakness Stakes after matching an $85 million offer made by Churchill Downs Incorporated.

== Social issues ==
=== Abortion ===
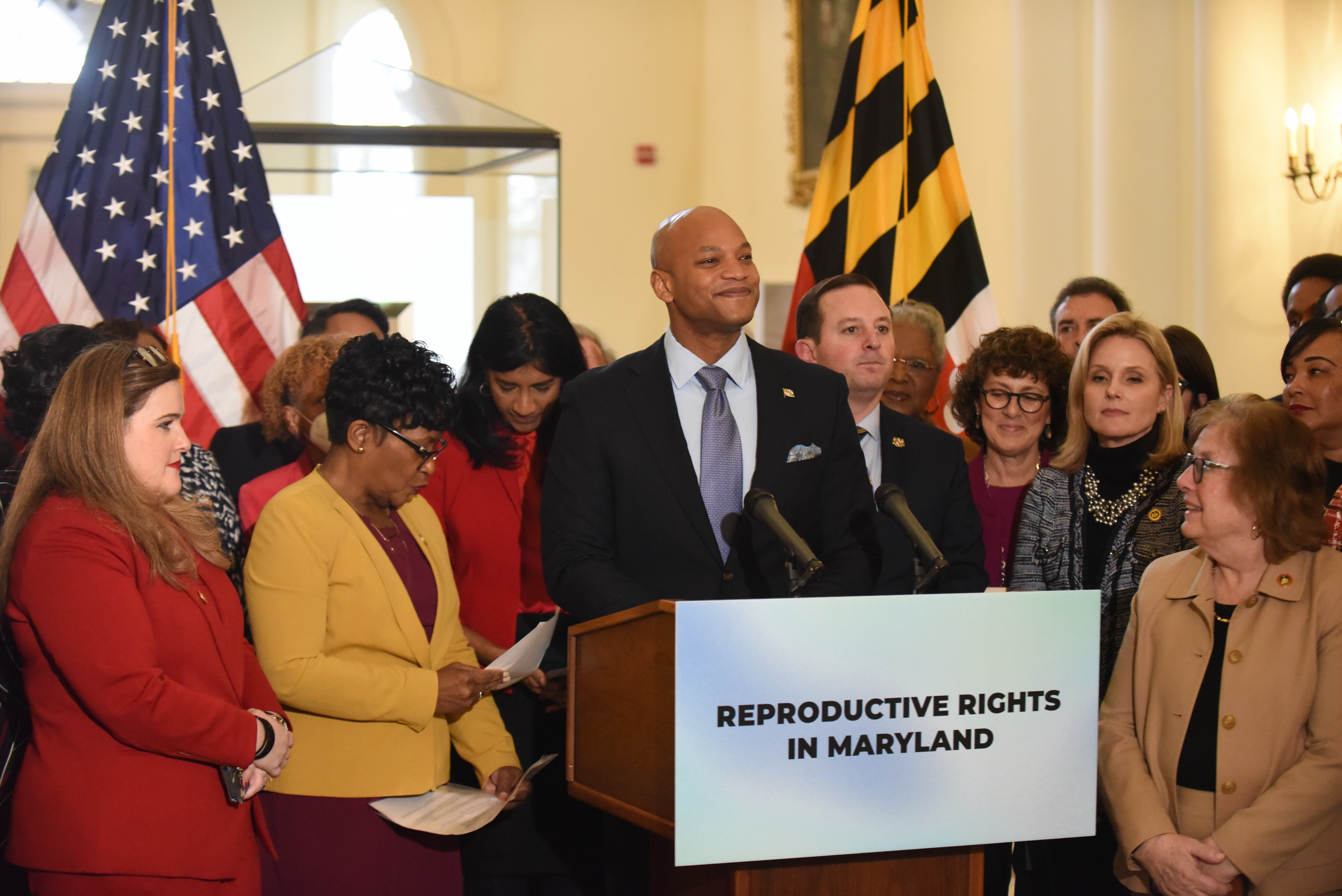
Governor Wes Moore holds a press conference to endorse bills protecting abortion rights, 2023

In June 2022, following the U.S. Supreme Court's ruling in Dobbs v. Jackson Women's Health Organization, Moore said that he would support an amendment to the Maryland Constitution to enshrine abortion access. He also pledged to release $3.5 million in funding for the Abortion Care Access Act, a bill passed in the 2022 legislative session that would expand the types of medical professionals who can perform abortions in Maryland, on his first day in office.

On January 19, 2023, Moore signed his first executive order releasing $3.5 million in funding for training healthcare providers in abortion care under the Abortion Care Access Act. In May 2023, he signed into law a pair of bills aimed at protecting patients seeking an abortion and increase access to abortion medication, and a bill that would create a 2024 referendum on codifying the right to abortion access into the Maryland Constitution. Question 1 passed with more than three times as many voters voting in favor of it than against it.

In April 2023, after a federal court ruling in FDA v. Alliance for Hippocratic Medicine repealed the Food and Drug Administration's approval of mifepristone, Moore said the state would begin stockpiling enough of the abortion pill to last two and a half years. In June 2023, he voted to approve $1.3 million toward purchasing 30,000 doses of mifepristone and 5,000 doses of misoprostol.

In February 2024, Moore criticized the Alabama Supreme Court's ruling in LePage v. Center for Reproductive Medicine, which held that frozen embryos had the same rights as children, calling it "out of step".

In May 2025, Moore signed into law a bill that would establish a $25 million grant fund to expand abortion access for uninsured or underinsured individuals, funded a $1 surcharge on insurance plans sold under the Affordable Care Act. The law made Maryland become the first state to use these funds for this purpose. The program was blocked from going into effect by federal health officials in January 2026, who said the program "exceeds permissible use" of the fees collected by the Affordable Care Act.

In May 2026, Moore signed into law a bill requiring hospitals to perform abortions in emergency medical situations.

=== Immigration ===
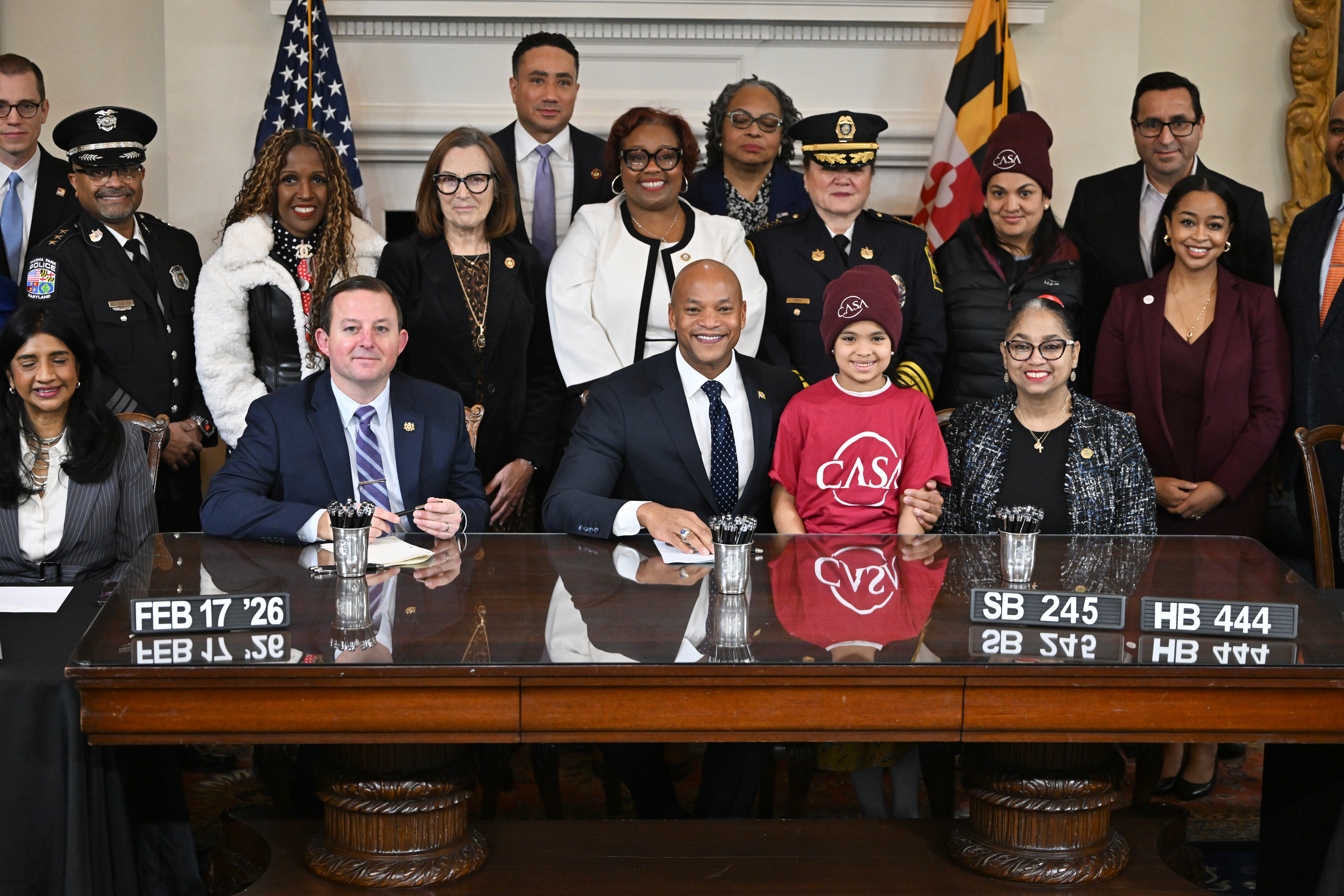
Moore signs the Maryland Values Act into law, 2026

Moore supports a balance between securing the United States' borders and creating pathways to citizenship for those already in the country. In June 2023, Moore said that he supported efforts to strengthen the federal temporary protected status policy for immigrants living in the United States. In June 2024, after a man who had entered the United States illegally was arrested in connection with the murder of Rachel Morin, Moore blamed congressional inaction on the issue of immigration as well as conditions at the Mexico–United States border for Morin's killing.

In June 2023, after multiple Republican governors sent members of their state national guards to the southern border, Moore told WRC-TV that he did not support sending members of the Maryland National Guard to the border. In January 2025, he declined to say if he would deploy Maryland National Guard members at the southern border if asked by the federal government. Moore also advised local jurisdictions to "follow the Constitution" when cooperating with federal immigration efforts. In May 2025, he signed into law the Maryland Values Act, which prohibits federal law enforcement from conducting immigration actions at sensitive locations.

In April 2025, Moore condemned the Trump administration's deportation of Kilmar Abrego Garcia on the grounds of inadequate due process, saying that "no one should be deported to the very county where a judge determined they will face persecution" and calling on the federal government to "correct" their error. He declined to travel to El Salvador to see Abrego Garcia, but said that his office was "looking at all available options to ensure that due process is going to be followed by El Salvador".

In February 2026, after it was reported that the U.S. Department of Homeland Security had purchased a warehouse in Washington County with plans to renovate it into an immigration detention facility, Moore ordered state agency heads and the attorney general of Maryland to review the federal government's purchase of the facility. He also wrote to Homeland Security Secretary Kristi Noem expressing concerns about the economic impacts the facility would have on the local area as well as the "troubling lack of transparency" around the purchase. That same month, he signed into law a bill to prohibit counties from entering into 287(g) program agreements with U.S. Immigration and Customs Enforcement (ICE). In May 2026, Moore signed into law a bill that prohibits law enforcement officers from wearing face coverings with exceptions for officers involved in undercover operations.

In April 2026, Moore signed into law the Maryland Values Act of 2026, which prohibits public school employees from assisting with immigration enforcement and requires public school employees to alert their local superintendents of immigration enforcement activities at schools. In May 2026, he allowed two immigration bills to into effect without his signature: the Community Trust Act, which prohibits correctional officers from contacting ICE agents for the deportation of an undocumented individual unless the person is a convicted felon, a registered sex offender, or meets other parameters; and the Data Privacy Act, which prohibits state and local agencies from sharing certain personal information for federal immigration enforcement.

=== LGBTQ rights ===
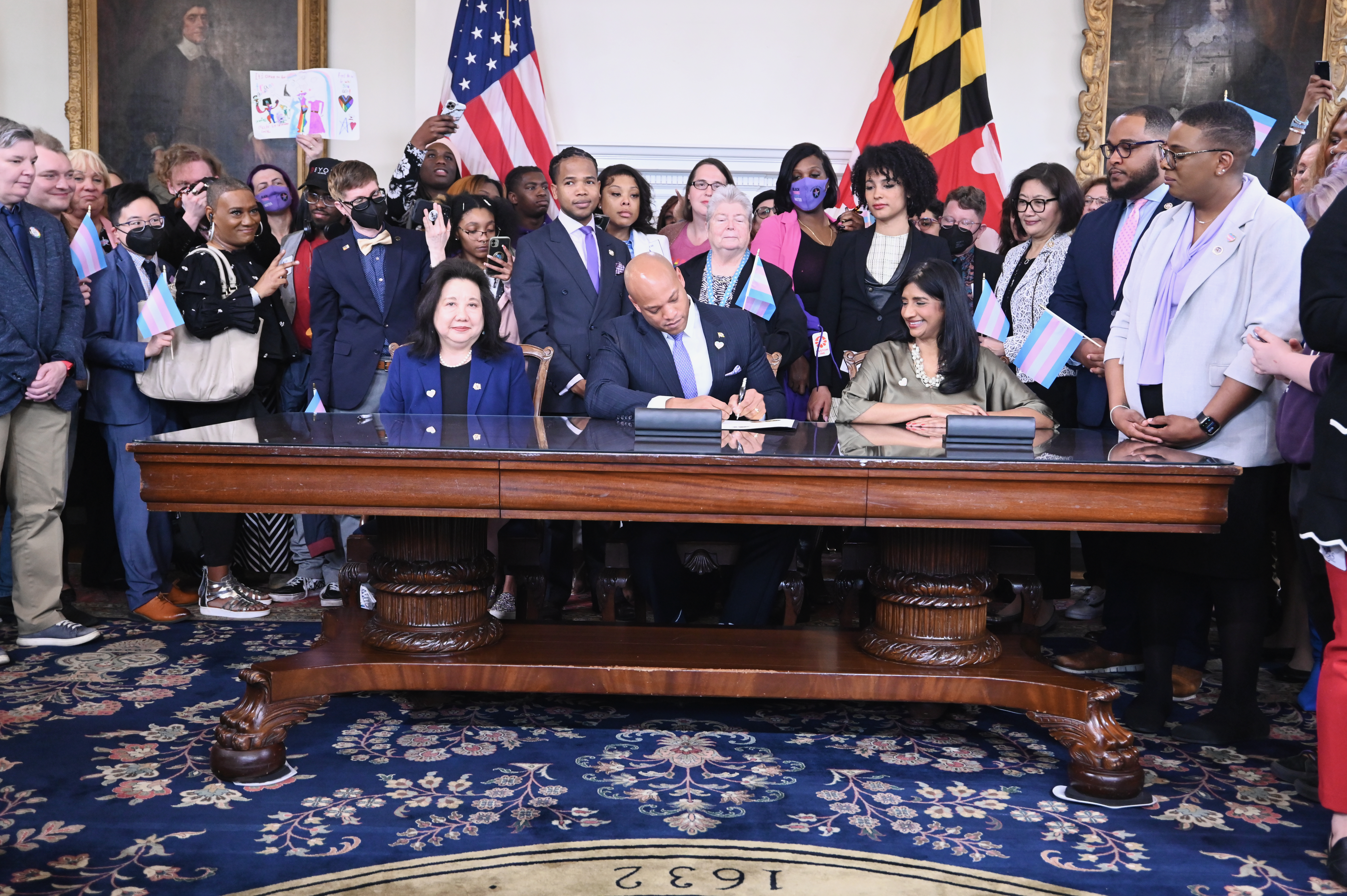
Moore signing a proclamation recognizing International Transgender Day of Visibility, 2023

During his 2022 gubernatorial campaign, Moore said he supported the Inclusive Schools Act, a bill introduced in the 2022 legislative session that banned schools from discriminating against students based on their sexual orientation and gender identity. He also supported the Trans Health Equity Act, a bill that would have required the state's Medicaid program to cover gender-affirming treatments. In December 2022, Moore praised the signing of the Respect for Marriage Act, which codifies same-sex and interracial marriage rights.

On March 31, 2023, Moore became the first Maryland governor to recognize International Transgender Day of Visibility when he issued an official proclamation.

In May 2023, Moore signed the Trans Health Equity Act into law and allowed a bill furthering an earlier repeal of the state's sodomy law to become law without his signature. In June 2023, he signed an executive order to protect people or entities that provide gender-affirming care from legal punishments by other states. During the 2024 legislative session, Moore signed into law the Trans Shield Act, which prevents states with anti-trans laws from prosecuting patients or entities within Maryland for providing gender-affirming care. In May 2025, Moore signed into law a bill decriminalizing the spread of HIV.

=== Marijuana ===
Moore supported legislation introduced and passed during the 2022 legislative session that created a ballot referendum to legalize recreational marijuana in Maryland, and another bill that would regulate marijuana possession should the referendum pass in November. During his 2022 gubernatorial campaign, Moore talked about implementing a recreational cannabis industry with a focus on equity "so that communities that have experienced the greatest disparities benefit the most." Question 4 passed with 67.2 percent of voters approving the measure on November 8, 2022. In January 2023, Moore signed an executive order releasing $46.5 million to start developing the framework for a recreational marijuana industry in the state, with a majority of the released funds going toward grants for minority-owned firms. In May 2023, he signed a bill regulating the state's recreational marijuana industry.

In October 2022, Moore praised President Joe Biden's pardon of thousands of people convicted of marijuana possession under federal law, and said that he would "fight to expunge the records of those arrested for marijuana possession [as governor]". In June 2024, Moore signed an executive order pardoning about 100,000 people with low-level cannabis-related convictions in Maryland. In June 2025, he pardoned an additional 6,900 individuals convicted of simple cannabis possession.

In May 2023, Moore allowed a bill that prohibits police from stopping a vehicle solely based on if they smell marijuana to become law without his signature.

=== Voting rights ===
During his 2022 gubernatorial campaign, Moore said he opposed voter-ID legislation introduced by state senator Justin Ready, calling it "voter suppression". In September 2022, Moore said he opposed a lawsuit filed by his Republican opponent, state delegate Dan Cox, against the Maryland State Board of Elections to block the early counting of Maryland's mail-in ballots in the 2022 elections, alleging that Cox was trying to sow distrust and uncertainty in the electoral system. The Maryland Court of Appeals unanimously rejected Cox's arguments to halt early mail-in ballot tabulation in October 2022.

In April 2023, Moore signed a bill to allow counties to begin counting mail-in ballots before Election Day. Before this bill was enacted, Maryland was the only state that restricted the processing of absentee ballots until after Election Day, according to the National Conference of State Legislatures.

In April 2026, Moore signed the Maryland Voting Rights Act into law, which allows challenges to counties or municipalities that hold elections in a way that dilutes the votes cast by minority voters. He also criticized the U.S. Supreme Court's ruling in Louisiana v. Callais, which he said would lead to decreased minority representation in Congress.

Moore has criticized the use of closed primaries in elections, including Maryland's, saying that they disenfranchise voters and should be "reevaluated".

==== Redistricting ====
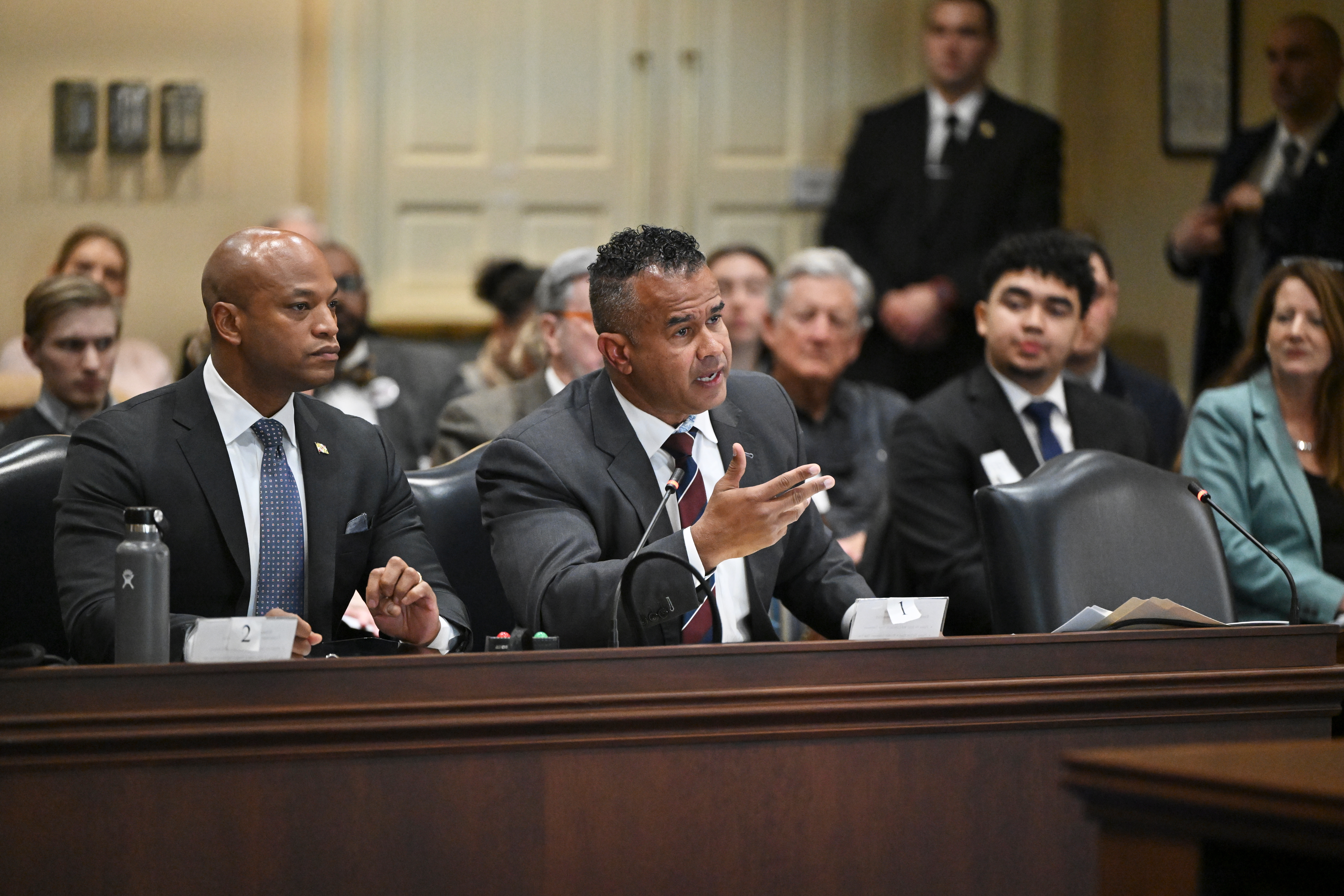
Moore and state delegate C. T. Wilson testify in support of legislation to redraw Maryland's congressional districts, 2026

Moore supports using an independent redistricting commission to draw Maryland's congressional districts, but contends that states should be able "to protect democracy and to protect their rights of their individual citizens" through redistricting until Congress acts to ban partisan gerrymandering and mid-decade redistricting. In August 2025, amid Republican efforts to redraw Texas's congressional districts to gain five congressional seats in the 2026 United States House of Representatives elections, Moore criticized the mid-decade redistricting efforts as a "partisan power grab" and said that he would "evaluate all options as states around the country make decisions regarding redistricting" with respect to Maryland. He declined to say whether he supported a bill that would automatically restart Maryland's congressional redistricting process if another state adopted a new congressional map outside of the regular decennial census period.

In November 2025, Moore announced the formation of an advisory commission on redistricting in Maryland, led by U.S. senator Angela Alsobrooks and former Maryland Attorney General Brian Frosh. In January 2026, a spokesperson for Moore said that he supported the congressional redistricting plan recommended by the advisory commission, which would increase the Democratic Party's chances of winning Maryland's 1st congressional district, and called on leaders of the Maryland General Assembly to hold a vote on it. The map passed the Maryland House of Delegates by a 99–37 vote on February 2, 2026, but died in the Maryland Senate after Senate President Bill Ferguson refused to hold a vote on the redistricting bill in the Senate. In March 2026, a spokesperson for Moore said he supported a compromise proposal that would create a referendum to amend the Constitution of Maryland to clarify that its rules about redistricting only apply to state legislative districts and not congressional districts. However, this compromise was rejected by Ferguson, who said the Senate would prioritize other issues with the remainder of the 2026 legislative session. The Maryland General Assembly adjourned sine die on April 13, 2026, without passing a new congressional redistricting map.

In July 2026, leaders of the Maryland General Assembly announced that the legislature would convene for a special session on redistricting following the U.S. Supreme Court's decision in Louisiana v. Callais. During the special session, the General Assembly passed a constitutional amendment that would exempt Maryland's congressional districts from redistricting guidelines in the state constitution, which Moore signed into law in August 2026.

=== Other issues ===
During an interview with the Associated Press in March 2023, Moore said that he understood why people continued to debate the issue of reparations to victims of slavery or their descendants and expressed support for efforts to address the modern impacts of institutional racism in the United States, including the racial wealth gap and disparities in food access, housing, and education. During the 2025 legislative session, he privately met with state legislators to raise concerns with a bill to study reparations in Maryland, reportedly showing lawmakers a draft executive order on reparations. Moore vetoed the reparations study bill in May 2025, saying that he felt that the issue had already been studied and that it was time "to focus on the work itself". He later announced that the state would provide over 400 communities impacted by racist policies with a "Just Communities" designation—which gives them a competitive advantage over other applicants for state grants and loans—and promised to work with lawmakers during the 2026 legislative session on a legislative package to address the racial wealth gap in Maryland. In December 2025, the Maryland General Assembly voted to override Moore's veto of the reparations study bill.

In April 2023, following an investigation by Maryland Attorney General Brian Frosh into child sexual abuse in the Roman Catholic Archdiocese of Baltimore, Attorney General Anthony Brown released a 463-page report accusing the archdiocese of covering up more than 600 cases of child sexual abuse against 156 Catholic priests over 60 years. A week later, Moore signed the Maryland Child Victims Act, which eliminates the statute of limitations on child sexual abuse lawsuits. In April 2025, after state fiscal analysts warned that settling lawsuits involving allegations of sexual abuse against state agencies could cost the state hundreds of millions, if not billions, of dollars, Moore signed into law a bill that lowered the amount of money survivors could win in court.

In May 2024, Moore signed into law a bill to ban the sale of speculative tickets and require ticket vendors to provide consumers with the full price of the ticket—including taxes and fees—and refunds if the ticket is counterfeit or if the event is canceled.

In May 2025, Moore signed into law a bill establishing the Department of Social and Economic Mobility, a cabinet-level agency to oversee social equity efforts in state government.

In October 2025, after a 16-year-old girl committed suicide while under supervision of the state's foster care system and a state audit found 280 instances of children in foster care being placed in hotels, Moore called for reforms to the state's foster care system. He also blamed his predecessor, Larry Hogan, for problems at the Maryland Department of Human Services. In April 2026, Moore signed Kanaiayah's Law, which establishes a guardianship assistance program and state foster youth ombudsman.

In May 2026, Moore signed into law the No Kings Act, which allows Maryland residents to sue federal officials who violate another's constitutional rights under color of law.

== Transportation ==
=== Roads, highways, and bridges ===
During his 2022 gubernatorial campaign, Moore said he did not support Governor Hogan's plan to widen portions of the Capital Beltway and Interstate 270 using high-occupancy toll lanes, saying that he would instead support a transit line alongside I-270 and a proposed transit line from Prince George's County to Charles County. Critics have accused Moore of flip-flopping on this stance after he told the Maryland Transit Opportunities that he would be willing to dedicate federal funds to the project, issuing a statement afterwards saying that he would be open to toll lanes if there were strong public consensus. In a radio interview with WAMU in July 2022, he said he preferred a "new type of proposal" for the I-270 toll lanes plan that included reversible lanes, increased transit, and greater collaboration with local "stakeholders."

In August 2023, Moore requested $2.4 billion in federal funding to add managed lanes to parts of the Capital Beltway and I-270, and to rebuild the American Legion Memorial Bridge. In January 2026, after meeting with U.S. Transportation Secretary Sean Duffy, Moore reversed his approach to rebuilding the American Legion Memorial Bridge, agreeing to instead seek a public–private partnership to rebuild the bridge.

In December 2023, facing a long-term budget shortfall, Moore announced a six-year plan to cut the state's transportation budget by $3.3 billion, or eight percent, including a $1.6 billion cut to "all major highway expansion construction projects" and a $652 million cut to transit expansion projects. The proposed plan would reduce commuter bus services and lines, delay the state's transition to electric buses, and cancel plans to expand the Brunswick Line. He later announced a one-year infusion of $150 million to the state's transportation fund, with most of the added funding being used to restore highway user revenue funding, to ease the effects of the cuts. Although the legislature included provisions to raise fees on vehicle registration for electric vehicles and heavier cars to prevent drastic cuts to the state's transportation projects, the Moore administration again proposed $1.3 billion in cuts to Maryland's transportation budget in September 2024, which would delay various infrastructure projects around the state, including the widening of the American Legion Memorial Bridge and the state's transition to electric buses. The proposed cuts would have also put the Maryland Transit Administration at risk of losing a federal grant that would have allowed it to replace the Baltimore LightRail's fleet of trains; however, this was avoided after Moore proposed about $420 million in vehicle-related fee increases in his fiscal year 2026 budget. In September 2025, the Moore administration proposed a $300 million funding increase for transportation projects in Maryland.

In October 2024, Moore said he supported the widening of Interstate 81 in Maryland.

In October 2026, Moore ordered the Maryland Transportation Authority to extend its pause on toll increases for another year, paying for the pause using money from a settlment over the Francis Scott Key Bridge collapse.

=== Francis Scott Key Bridge collapse ===
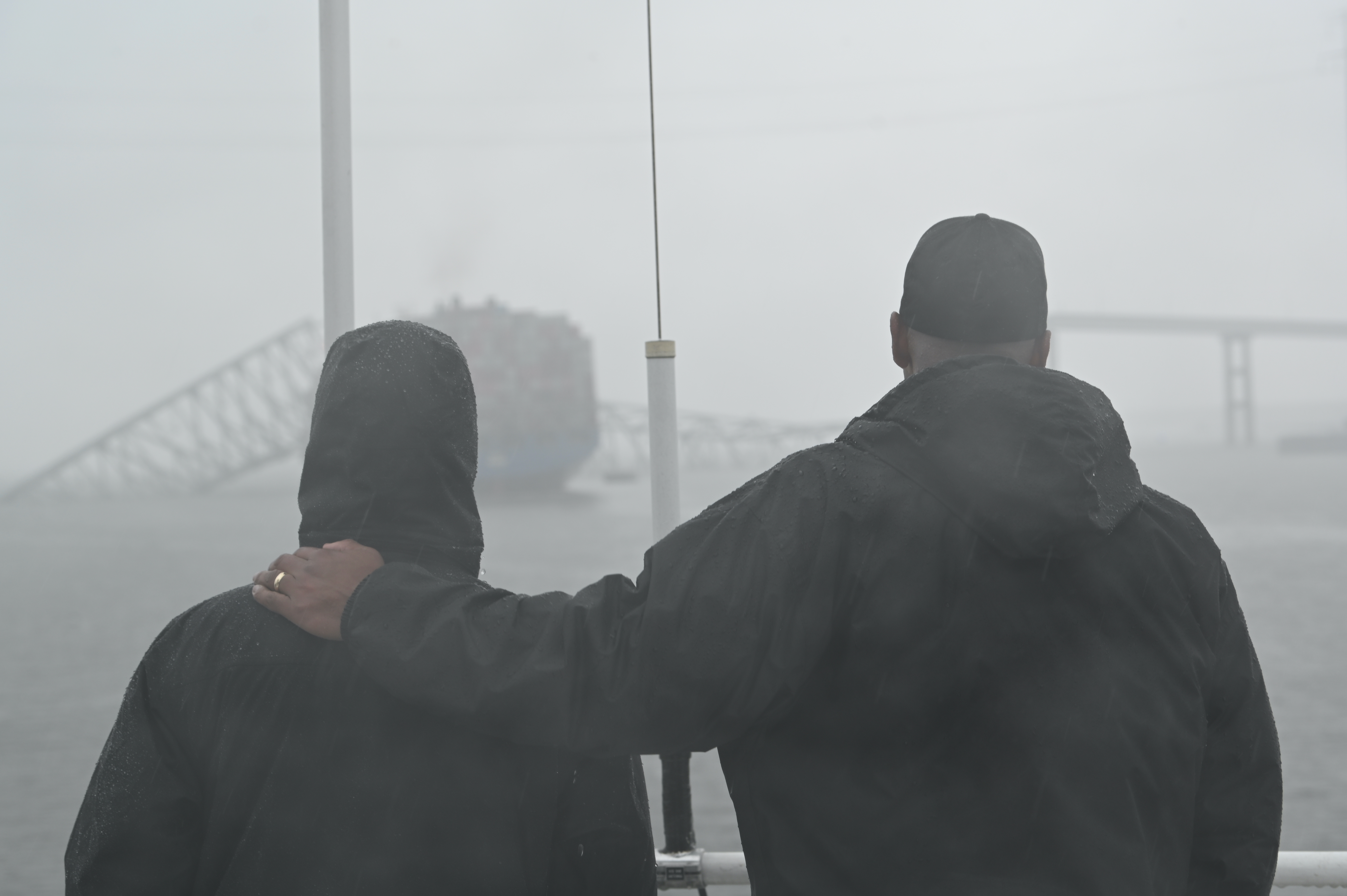
Governor Moore visits the Francis Scott Key Bridge collapse site with Baltimore Mayor Brandon Scott, 2024

In March 2024, following the Francis Scott Key Bridge collapse, Moore declared a state of emergency and called the disaster a "global crisis". He also thanked Maryland Transportation Authority Police officers for closing the bridge after receiving mayday calls from the MV Dali, which prevented additional deaths during the collapse. In the legislature, Moore supported the PORT Act, a bill introduced by Senate President Bill Ferguson to provide $60 million in financial assistance to workers and businesses affected by the subsequent closure of the Port of Baltimore and introduced a bill that would create a permanent state scholarship for the children of surviving spouses of maintenance workers killed during the bridge collapse, which was later amended into the PORT Act. Moore signed the PORT Act into law in April 2024.

Following the disaster, Moore urged Congress to pass legislation that would have the federal government cover the costs of rebuilding the bridge. In December 2024, President Joe Biden signed into law a continuing resolution bill that included a provision to fully fund the Francis Scott Key Bridge replacement.

=== Mass transit ===
Moore opposed Governor Hogan's decision to cancel the Red Line, and said during his 2022 gubernatorial campaign that he supported restarting the rail project. He also called for an "intermodal Red Line, that is built quickly, cost-effectively, and with community input on stops, disruptions, and impact on local businesses".

In November 2022, Moore said he would support creating a regional transit authority for working on Baltimore-area transportation projects.

In his first budget in January 2023, Moore proposed allocating $500 million toward unspecified transportation projects. When asked by the Capital Gazette if this money would be used for the Red Line, Moore said that he had spoken with federal officials about restarting the line and that he did not want to "start from scratch". He also said he planned to use federal funds and public-private partnerships in transportation projects, including the Purple and Red lines. The budget was amended to reduce this funding to $100 million, but also gave the governor the ability to tap the state's "rainy day" fund for an extra $100 million.

On June 15, 2023, Moore announced that he would seek federal funding to restart efforts to build the Red Line.

In April 2025, after riding the SCMaglev during a trade trip in Japan, Moore said that he supported a proposed maglev project connecting Washington, D.C. and Baltimore. After the Federal Railroad Administration cancelled grants toward studying a maglev train between Washington, D.C. and Baltimore in August 2025, a spokesperson for Moore conceded that the project "had challenges that were insurmountable", but said that the Moore administration would continue working with the FRA on future transportation projects.

== National politics ==
=== Foreign policy ===
Moore supports Israel's right to defend itself and a two-state solution to the Israeli–Palestinian conflict. In December 2022, he attended the Jewish Community Relations Council of Greater Washington's legislative breakfast, where he said he would be "very aggressive" in promoting trade between Maryland and Israel and promised that one of his first overseas visits would be to Israel. He expressed solidarity with Israel amid the October 7 attacks, and later supported an immediate ceasefire in the Gaza war. In October 2024, Moore criticized a Students for Justice in Palestine event at the University of Maryland, College Park held on the one-year anniversary of the October 7 attack to honor Palestinian civilians killed in the Gaza war, saying that he felt that it was an "inappropriate date for such an event". In May 2026, Moore told Politico that he believed Israeli Prime Minister Benjamin Netanyahu had committed war crimes in the Gaza war, citing his use of food as a negotiating tool.

In April 2026, Moore criticized U.S. involvement in the 2026 Iran war, likening it to the war in Afghanistan and fearing it would evolve into "another forever war". He also criticized President Donald Trump for not clearly addressing the American people on what the U.S. is doing in Iran or what success looks like. In August 2026, he condemned deteriorating conditions aboard the USS Abaham Lincoln.

=== 2024 elections ===
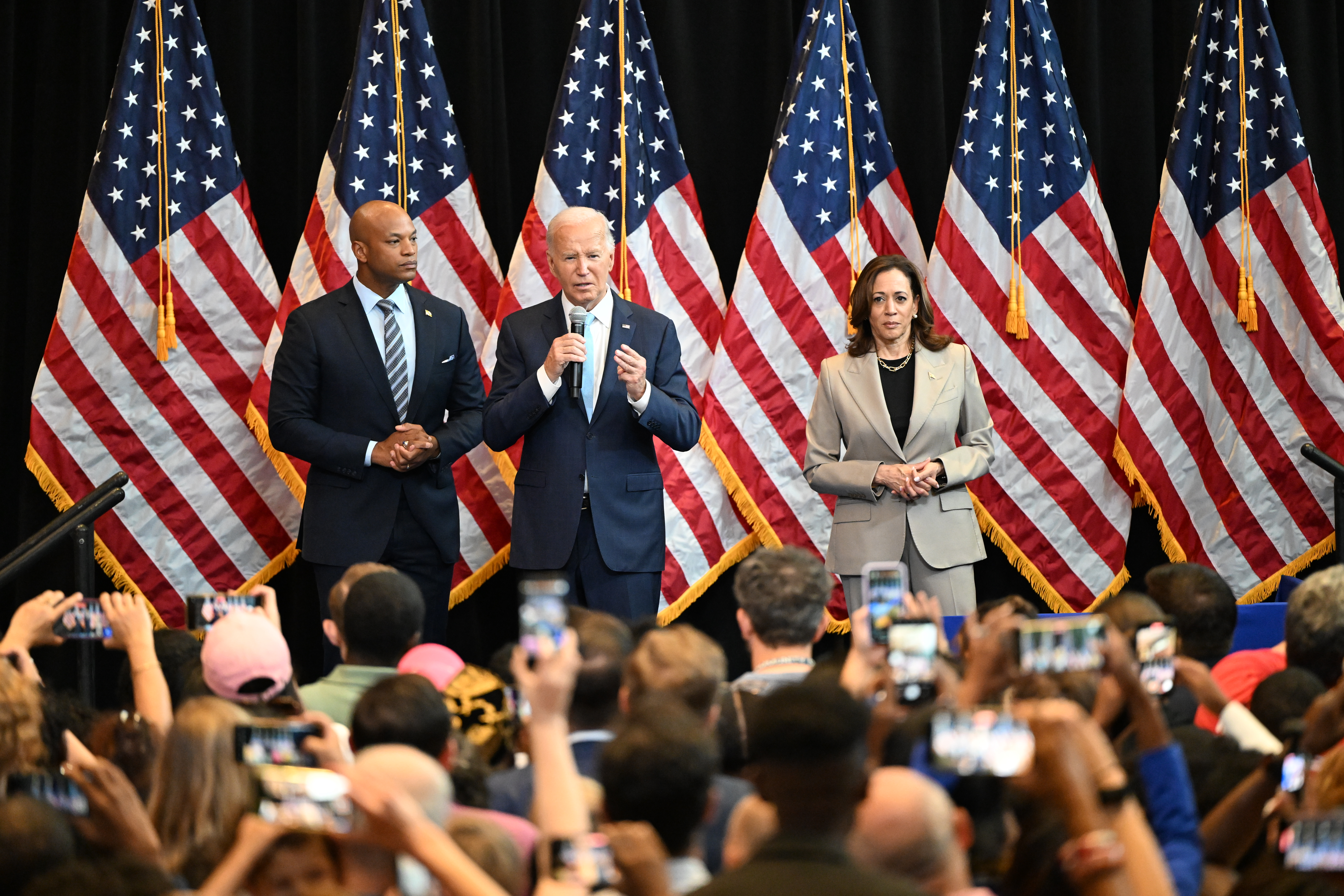
Moore with President Joe Biden and Vice President Kamala Harris, August 2024

During the 2024 presidential election, Moore was a member of the Biden-Harris Campaign National Advisory Board and campaigned for President Joe Biden in Wisconsin and Georgia. He also defended Biden from calls to drop out of the presidential election amid the first 2024 presidential debate, highlighting Biden's accomplishments in office while conceding that the debate was a "rough night" for the president. After Biden withdrew from the race on July 21, 2024, Moore endorsed and campaigned for Vice President Kamala Harris.

During the 2024 United States Senate election in Maryland, Moore endorsed Prince George's County Executive Angela Alsobrooks in the Democratic primary over U.S. representative David Trone. He played an active role in campaigning against Republican nominee and former governor Larry Hogan in the general election, with several of his top advisors leaving their positions in the Moore administration to form a political action committee called Unity First PAC to support Alsobrooks and other Democratic nominees downballot.

=== Trump administration ===
After Harris was defeated by former president Donald Trump in the general election on November 5, 2024, Moore pledged to work with the Trump administration, but said he would push back when necessary. He also pledged to defend Marylanders' constitutional rights, and restore faith in public institutions and democracy during Trump's second presidency. By February 2025, Moore maintained that he would still be open to working with anyone to advance Maryland's interests, but expressed pessimism toward being able to partner with the Trump administration, adding that he planned to use the power of his office to counter Trump—including executive orders and backing federal litigation filed by Maryland Attorney General Anthony Brown against several of Trump's actions—and criticizing the president for dismantling federal departments, furloughing thousands of federal workers, and starting tariff wars. Moore opposed the One Big Beautiful Bill Act (OBBB), calling it "one of the worst bills for working families that our country has ever proposed" and predicting that it would result in one of the largest upward transfers of wealth from the poor to the rich in American history through cuts to federal assistance programs and tax cuts for wealthy individuals and big corporations. In August 2026, Moore praised the Rural Health Transformation Program passed as part of the OBBB.

In October 2025, Moore blamed Trump for the 2025 United States federal government shutdown while urging him to end the shutdown, saying that Maryland would likely face "serious damage" as the shutdown continued through infrastructure project delays, federal employees not receiving pay, and small businesses losing revenue. At the same time, he said that he would work with state companies to protect federal workers impacted by the government shutdown and directed state agencies to deploy contingency plans to keep federally funded programs continually operating. Moore initially declined to provide state funding to fund the Supplemental Nutrition Assistance Program (SNAP) after the U.S. Department of Agriculture (USDA) declined to use its contingency fund to continue funding SNAP, but later signed an order declaring a state of emergency and providing $10 million in funds to assist food banks across Maryland. After the Trump administration said it would only partially fund SNAP food benefits following a federal court ruling ordering it to pay SNAP benefits out of the USDA's contingency fund, Moore signed an executive order providing $62 million in state funds to provide SNAP participants with full benefits during the month of November. In November 2025, Moore criticized the bipartisan Senate agreement to end the shutdown, saying that it was "completely unacceptable" to pass a bill ending the shutdown without extending healthcare subsidies.

In January 2026, Moore said he hated the thought of another government shutdown, citing the cost of the previous shutdown to Maryland's federal workforce, but supported efforts by Democrats in the U.S. Senate to block a vote on the U.S. Department of Homeland Security budget following the killing of Alex Pretti.

== Approval ratings ==
=== Graphical summary ===
View source data.

=== Polling ===
The following are polls of Wes Moore's approval rating among Marylanders.

Poll source	Date(s) administered	Sample size (Note: Key: A – all adults RV – registered voters LV – likely voters V – unclear)	Margin of error	Approve	Disapprove	Net approval	Undecided
University of Maryland, Baltimore County	September 22–29, 2026	776 (LV)	± 3.5%	49%	42%	+7	8%
Zenith Research	July 27 – August 3, 2026	800 (LV)	± 3.5%	56%	39%	+17	5%
University of Maryland, Baltimore County	March 17–22, 2026	804 (A)	± 3.5%	48%	42%	+6	9%
Gonzales Research	December 21, 2025 – January 6, 2026	808 (RV)	± 3.5%	52%	41%	+11	7%
Morning Consult	October – December, 2025	– (RV)	–	61%	28%	+33	11%
University of Maryland, Baltimore County	October 21–25, 2025	810 (A)	± 3.4%	52%	44%	+8	4%
OpinionWorks	October 7–10, 2025	928 (RV)	± 3.2%	54%	36%	+18	10%
Morning Consult	July – September, 2025	– (RV)	–	59%	30%	+29	11%
Victoria Research	July 24–30, 2025	1,256 (A)	± 2.7%	50%	43%	+7	8%
Morning Consult	April – June, 2025	– (RV)	–	60%	29%	+31	11%
Morning Consult	January – March, 2025	– (RV)	–	59%	27%	+32	14%
Gonzales Research	March 5–9, 2025	804 (RV)	± 3.5%	55%	36%	+19	9%
University of Maryland, Baltimore County	February 11–15, 2025	803 (A)	± 3.5%	52%	40%	+12	7%
Braun Research	January 24–28, 2025	1,002 (RV)	± 3.3%	59%	28%	+31	13%
Gonzales Research	December 27, 2024 – January 4, 2025	811 (RV)	± 3.5%	61%	28%	+33	11%
Morning Consult	October – December, 2024	– (RV)	–	62%	25%	+37	13%
Morning Consult	July – September, 2024	– (RV)	–	63%	23%	+40	14%
University of Maryland, Baltimore County	September 23–28, 2024	917 (RV)	± 3.2%	54%	32%	+22	12%
Braun Research	September 19–23, 2024	1,012 (RV)	± 3.5%	60%	28%	+32	12%
Gonzales Research	August 24–30, 2024	818 (RV)	± 3.5%	64%	24%	+40	12%
Fabrizio Ward/Impact Research	August 14−20, 2024	700 (LV)	± 4.0%	57%	21%	+36	22%
Morning Consult	April – July, 2024	– (RV)	–	65%	22%	+43	13%
Public Policy Polling	June 19–20, 2024	635 (RV)	± 3.9%	50%	22%	+28	27%
Morning Consult	January 2 – April 1, 2024	343 (RV)	–	60%	24%	+36	16%
Braun Research	March 5−12, 2024	1,004 (RV)	± 3.3%	53%	26%	+27	21%
Gonzales Research	January 23 – February 2, 2024	815 (RV)	± 3.5%	58%	28%	+30	14%
Morning Consult	August 1 – October 31, 2023	– (RV)	–	59%	24%	+35	17%
Morning Consult	July 1 – September 30, 2023	– (RV)	–	60%	23%	+37	16%
Gonzales Research	September 18–28, 2023	820 (RV)	± 3.5%	60%	25%	+35	15%
Morning Consult	April 1 – June 30, 2023	4,779 (RV)	± 1.0%	58%	22%	+36	20%
Gonzales Research	May 30 – June 6, 2023	841 (RV)	± 3.5%	55%	27%	+28	18%
Goucher College	April 18–23, 2023	800 (A)	± 3.5%	53%	26%	+27	20%
Morning Consult	January 1 – March 31, 2023	3,594 (RV)	± 2.0%	55%	16%	+39	29%
