= Labor peace agreement =

Legal agreement between employers and trade unions

In United States labor law, a labor peace agreement (LPA) or labor peace ordinance is an agreement between employers and trade unions to apply pressure to gain leverage. In New York, following Percoco v. United States, the New York City government passed a law on December 24, 2021, requiring some food and retail businesses to sign labor peace agreements.
