= The Harbor Bank of Maryland =

Commercial bank in Maryland, US

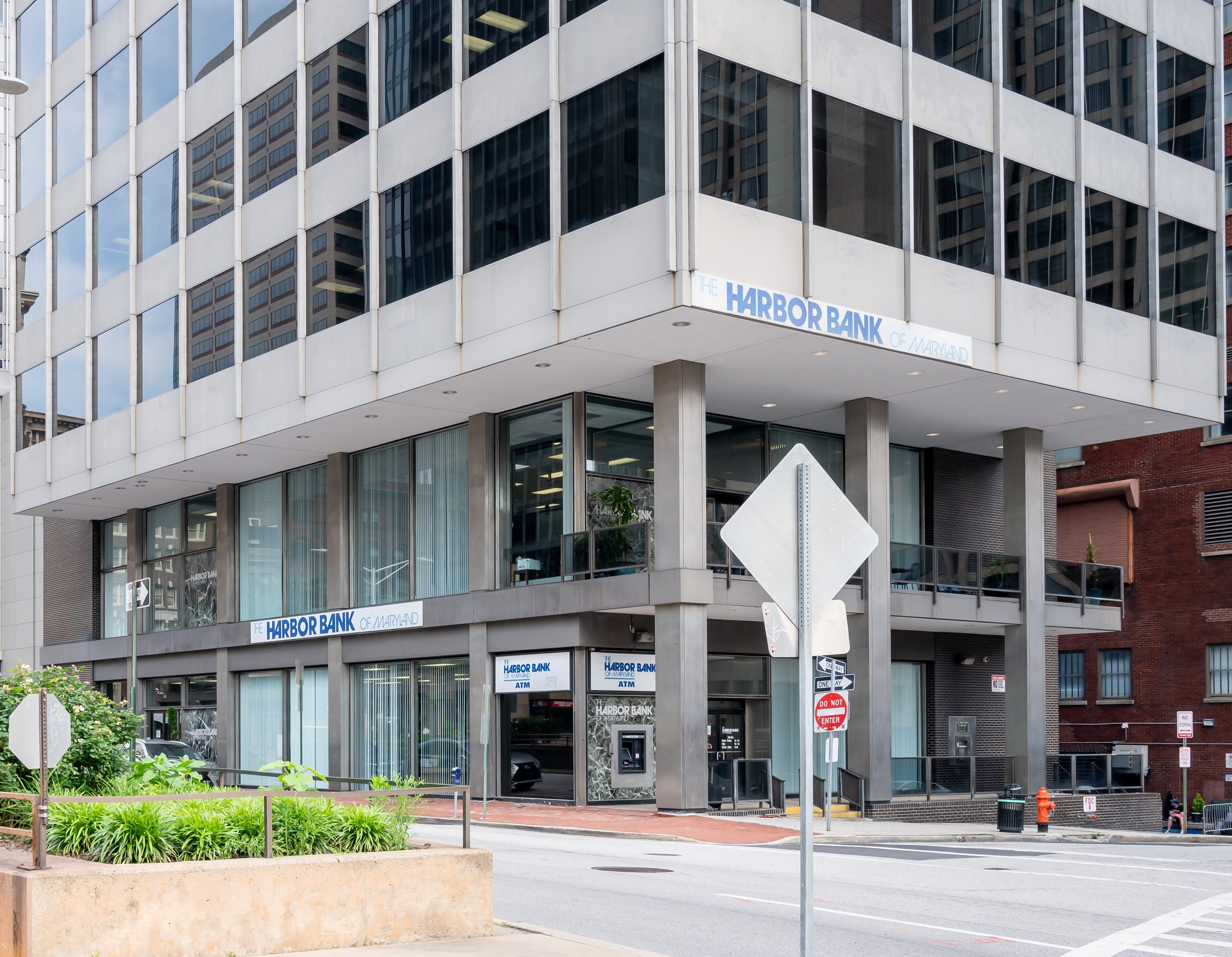
- The Harbor Bank of Maryland's headquarters in Baltimore, Maryland.
- Industry: Banking; Financial services
- Founded: September 13, 1982
- Founder: Joseph Haskins, Jr.; Curtis N. Adams; Cleveland A. Chandler; Joseph A. Chester, Jr.; Herbert Gustin; Charles H. Harmon; Wilson B. Lau, Sr.; Ernest J. Colvin; Virgil Sneed; William L. Siskind; Delores G. Kelley; A. Dwight Pettit; Frank A. DeFilippo
- Headquarters: 25 West Fayette Street, Baltimore, Maryland 21201
- Number of locations: 7 branches (2025)
- Key people: Joseph Haskins, Jr. (chairman); John D. Lewis (CEO)
- Parent: Harbor Bankshares Corporation
- Website: theharborbank.com

The Harbor Bank of Maryland is a commercial bank providing capital and financial services to the Greater Baltimore and Washington D.C. markets. Harbor Bank is designated by the Federal Deposit Insurance Corporation (FDIC) as a Minority Depository Institution (MDI), as well as a certified Community Development Financial Institution (CDFI), by the United States Treasury.

The Harbor Bank of Maryland has seven branches throughout the state of Maryland, with an office dedicated to loan production in Silver Spring.

== History ==
=== Pre-opening ===
In June 1973, an organizing committee named "Capital Strategy, Incorporated" filed an application with the Comptroller of the Currency to form a nationally chartered bank named "Harbor National Bank". The committee, led by Joseph Chester, was required by the FDIC to raise $1.5 million in capital (equivalent to over $10 million today) to begin operations.

The committee fundraised for several years, but was unable to get the necessary capital. By 1977, the committee had dwindled in members and efforts. A new committee member, Joseph Haskins, Jr., designed a plan to capitalize the bank with financial support from Baltimore's faith-based communities.

A call from a Senator in 1979 informed the committee that the Federal Reserve Bank would not authorize a federal bank charter. This catalyzed a pivot to a state charter for the bank, which required even more funds. A short-term commercial banking charter was granted by Maryland in March 1980. The state charter allowed investors to purchase shares of the bank, which was a major boost to the revitalized fundraising efforts.

=== Opening, operating, and growing ===
Once the administrative and logistical elements were organized, the bank officially opened on September 13, 1982. By 1987, Harbor Bank was poised for Haskins to officially lead the bank as president and CEO. Haskins instilled a new culture, improved professionalism, increased financial literacy outreach, opened more branches, and offered more banking products/services.

The Bank's holding company, Harbor Bankshares Corporation, was formed in 1992. In May 1993, bank moved headquarters from 21 West Fayette to 25 West Fayette Street to accommodate increased staffing and customers. Harbor Bank became the first community bank to launch an investment subsidiary, Harbor Financial Services (HFS) in 1996. Two new financial subsidiaries were launched in 2002; The Harbor Bank of Maryland Community Development Entity (Harbor CDE) and The Harbor Bank of Baltimore LLC, which became The Harbor Bank of Maryland Community Development Corporation (Harbor CDC).

Haskins relinquished the presidency, remaining as chief executive officer of The Harbor Bank of Maryland, Harbor Bankshares Corporation, and president of Harbor Bankshares Corporation in July 2000. Haskins retired from his CEO role in 2023 and was succeeded by John Lewis, who previously served as president and chief operating officer.

The Harbor Bank of Maryland is a full-service commercial bank offering checking, savings, CDs and a varying selection of loans.
