= Helene Grady =

American public administrator and academic executive (born 1971)

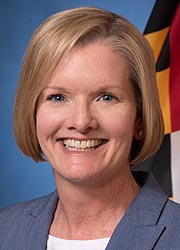
- Grady in 2023

Secretary of the Maryland Department of Budget and Management
- In office January 18, 2023 – October 14, 2025
- Governor: Wes Moore
- Preceded by: Marc Nicole (acting)
- Succeeded by: Jake Weissmann

Personal details
- Born: March 1971 (age 54) Philadelphia, Pennsylvania, U.S.
- Education: La Salle University (BA); Harvard University (MPP)

Helene T. Grady (born March 1971) is an American public administrator and academic executive who served as the Maryland Secretary of Budget and Management from 2023 to 2025. Appointed by governor Wes Moore, she acted as the administration's chief fiscal adviser and oversaw the mandated transition of retired state employees to Medicare. Prior to her state service, Grady held senior leadership roles at Johns Hopkins University, including vice president, chief financial officer, and treasurer. She previously served in municipal finance and budget departments for the cities of Baltimore and Philadelphia.

== Early life and education ==
Grady was born March 1971 in Philadelphia. Her hometown is Flourtown, Pennsylvania where she graduated from Mount Saint Joseph Academy.

In 1993, Grady earned a B.A. in English and urban studies magna cum laude from La Salle University. She attended Harvard Kennedy School where she earned a Master of Public Policy in 1996.

== Career ==
=== Early career ===
Grady began her career in public administration in the City of Philadelphia's Office of Budget and Program Evaluation. She served as assistant budget director from 1996 to 1999 and as deputy budget director from 1999 to 2000. Following her time in Philadelphia city government, she worked as the director of finance and budget for Amtrak in 2000.

She moved to Baltimore, where she joined the Baltimore City Department of Finance. She served as a principal program assessment analyst from 2001 to 2005 and was subsequently promoted to deputy director of finance, a role she held from 2005 to 2010. Years later, she returned to municipal service as a member of the Baltimore City Mayor's Finance Transition Team from 2020 to 2021.

=== Johns Hopkins University ===
In 2010, Grady joined Johns Hopkins University as the associate dean for finance and administration at the School of Nursing, serving until 2012. She was then promoted to vice president for planning and budget, a position she held from 2012 to 2020.

In 2020, Grady was elevated to the newly created role of vice president, chief financial officer, and treasurer. In this capacity, she managed the university's financial functions until 2023. During her tenure at Johns Hopkins, she developed a 10-year financial projection model to guide strategic decision-making. She also provided support for major initiatives, including the development of the SNF Agora building, the university's new facility at 555 Pennsylvania Avenue in Washington, D.C., and the implementation of a $1.8 billion financial aid gift for undergraduate students.

=== Maryland Secretary of Budget and Management ===
Following the 2022 Maryland gubernatorial election, Grady was nominated by governor Wes Moore to serve as the administration's primary fiscal adviser. She served as acting secretary of budget and management from January 18, 2023, until her confirmation on March 2, 2023. She held the position of secretary until her resignation on October 14, 2025.

During her tenure, the administration addressed an inherited structural deficit, turning it into a surplus, and implemented tax cuts for middle-class families. Grady was also responsible for leading a mandated transition of 50,000 retired state employees to Medicare, a move credited with saving the state approximately $200 million annually.

In August 2025, Grady announced she would step down from her position in October of that year to launch her own consulting firm.

== Personal life ==
Grady is married to Matthew Gallagher, the president and chief executive officer of the Goldseker Foundation and former chief of staff to governor Martin O'Malley.
