= Maryland Department of Juvenile Services =

State agency of Maryland

The Maryland Department of Juvenile Services (DJS) is a state agency of Maryland, headquartered in One Center Plaza, Downtown Baltimore. DJS operates juvenile correctional facilities.

== History ==
The agency currently known as the Maryland Department of Juvenile Service was originally created in the form of several training schools under the jurisdiction of the Maryland State Department of Education in 1922, transferred to the now-defunct Maryland Department of Public Welfare from 1943 to 1966, previously named as the Maryland Department of Juvenile Services from 1966 to 1969, reduced to subcabinet status as the Juvenile Services Administration of the Maryland Department of Health and Mental Hygiene from 1969 to 1987, renamed as the Juvenile Services from 1987 to 1989, before being restored to Cabinet status as the Department of Juvenile Services from 1989 to 1995, as the Department of Juvenile Justice from 1995 to 2003, and under its current name since 2003.

== Facilities ==
DJS operates "youth centers", statewide facilities for sentenced male youth, and countywide holding facilities that serve youth of specific counties. The youth center system is headquartered in Cumberland.

Youth centers:

- Backbone Mountain Youth Centers, Garrett County
- Green Ridge Youth Center, Allegany County
- Meadow Mountain Youth Center, Garrett County
- Savage Mountain Youth Center, Garrett County

Countywide facilities:

- Baltimore City Juvenile Justice Center, Baltimore City
- Cheltenham Youth Facility, Prince George's County - serves Anne Arundel, Calvert, Charles, Prince George's, and St. Mary's counties
- Lower Eastern Shore Children's Center (LESCC), Salisbury - serves the Eastern Shore of Maryland, opened in 2002
- Alfred D. Noyes Children's Center, Montgomery County - primarily serves Montgomery County, also serves Federick, Howard, and Washington counties
- Western Maryland Children's Center, Washington County - serves Allegany, Frederick, Garrett, Montgomery, and Washington counties.
- Charles H. Hickey, Jr., School, Baltimore County, formerly the "Maryland Training School for Boys" between 1918 and 1985

Since December 2011, the J. DeWeese Carter Youth Facility in Kent County serves as Maryland's long-term confinement center for adjudicated girls. Previously it was the detention facility for nine counties of Maryland's Eastern Shore.

The Thomas J. S. Waxter Center in Anne Arundel County provides a detention program for up to 50 girls; it previously had long-term secure confinement for up to ten girls, but the secure program ended in December 2011. Waxter, originally named the Southern Maryland Children's Center, was renamed in 1963 after the Director of the State Department of Public Welfare; his term began in 1953 and ended with his 1962 death.

The Victor Cullen Center is a regional treatment center for boys having substance abuse and mental health issues. The William Donald Schaefer House in Baltimore is a drug treatment center for boys in Baltimore.
