= List of people executed in Maryland =

The following is a list of people executed in the U.S. state of Maryland.

== 1638–1699 ==
Slave executions
Executions by firing squad

Name	Race	Age	Sex	Date of execution	County	Crime	Victim(s)	Governor
Thomas Smith	White		M	June 20, 1638	St. Mary's	Piracy		Leonard Calvert
Counaweza	Native American		M	1653	St. Mary's	Murder		William Stone
Skigtamongh	Native American		M	1653	St. Mary's	Murder		William Stone
Richard Ingle	White	44	M	1653	St. Mary's	Piracy		William Stone
William Eltonhead	White		M	1655	St. Mary's	Treason		William Stone
William Lewis	White		M	1655	St. Mary's	Treason		William Stone
John Leggatt	White		M	1655	St. Mary's	Treason		William Stone
John Pedro	White		M	1655	St. Mary's	Treason		William Stone
Two or more unknowns	White		M	July 1657	Anne Arundel	Petty treason-Murder	Mr. Parr, white	Josias Fendall
John Dandy	White		M	October 3, 1657	Calvert	Murder	Henry Gough, child, white (Note: Previously murdered a Native American boy but was acquitted on a technicality.)	Josias Fendall
Elizabeth Greene	White		F	July 8, 1664	St. Mary's	Murder	Her infant, white	Charles Calvert, 3rd Baron Baltimore
Jacob	Black		M	October 4, 1664	St. Mary's	Rape		Charles Calvert, 3rd Baron Baltimore
Joseph Fincher	White		M	January 1665	Anne Arundel	Murder	Jeffrey Haggman, white	Charles Calvert, 3rd Baron Baltimore
Two or more unknowns	Native American		M	November 1665	Charles	?		Charles Calvert, 3rd Baron Baltimore
Jacob	Black		M	November 1665	St. Mary's (Note: Jacob's crime was committed at Spesutie Island in Baltimore County, now part of Harford County.)	Petty treason-Murder	Mary Utie, white (Note: Pregnant when murdered.)	Charles Calvert, 3rd Baron Baltimore
Two unknowns	Native American		M	November 1665	St. Mary's	?		Charles Calvert, 3rd Baron Baltimore
Walter Pake	White		M	January 7, 1669	St. Mary's	Murder	William Price, white	Charles Calvert, 3rd Baron Baltimore
Anatchcom	Native American		M	May 8, 1669	St. Mary's (Note: Crime occurred in the Eastern Shore region (county unknown).)	Murder	Capt. Odber, white	Charles Calvert, 3rd Baron Baltimore
Joan Colledge	White		F	October 18, 1670	St. Mary's	Murder	Her illegitimate daughter, white	Charles Calvert, 3rd Baron Baltimore
John	Black		M	April 14, 1671	St. Mary's (Note: The murder of Hawkins was committed in Cecil County.)	Murder	John Hawkins, white (John's owner)	Charles Calvert, 3rd Baron Baltimore
James Sall	White		M	April 14, 1671	St. Mary's	Murder	John Hawkins, white (John's owner)	Charles Calvert, 3rd Baron Baltimore
Robert Spear	White		M	April 14, 1671	St. Mary's	Murder	John Hawkins, white (John's owner)	Charles Calvert, 3rd Baron Baltimore
Robert Warby	White		M	April 14, 1671	St. Mary's	Murder	John Hawkins, white (John's owner)	Charles Calvert, 3rd Baron Baltimore
Isabella Yausley	White		F	April 14, 1671	St. Mary's	Murder	Her illegitimate son, white	Charles Calvert, 3rd Baron Baltimore
William Sewick	White		M	1681	St. Mary's	Bestiality		Charles Calvert, 3rd Baron Baltimore
John Edwards	White		M	October 6, 1685	St. Mary's (Note: Edwards' crime was committed in Calvert County. Fowler was tried and convicted in Calvert County. Vanson's crime was committed in Calvert County.)	Burglary	Susannah Darnell, white	Benedict Calvert, 4th Baron Baltimore
Rebecca Fowler	White		F	October 6, 1685	St. Mary's	Witchcraft	N/A	Benedict Calvert, 4th Baron Baltimore
Joseph Tomlinson	White		M	October 6, 1685	St. Mary's	Rape	Elizabeth Lothworth, white	Benedict Calvert, 4th Baron Baltimore
Richard Vanson	White		M	October 6, 1685	St. Mary's	Murder	David Ogleby, white	Benedict Calvert, 4th Baron Baltimore
Mary Axell	White		F	December 7, 1685	St. Mary's (Note: Crime committed in Cecil County.)	Murder	Elizabeth Axell, white (daughter)	Benedict Calvert, 4th Baron Baltimore
Joseph Emeritt	White		M	September 20, 1687	St. Mary's (Note: Crimes committed in Charles and Talbot County.)	Petty treason-Murder	Dominico Gambra, white	Benedict Calvert, 4th Baron Baltimore
Thomas Leister	White		M	September 20, 1687	St. Mary's	Murder	Richard Nicholson, white	Benedict Calvert, 4th Baron Baltimore
John Woodcock	White		M	April 28, 1691	St. Mary's	Murder		Nehemiah Blakiston
Abigail Kimball	White		F	December 1692 (Note: Abigail was executed by burning.)	St. Mary's (Note: Crime committed in Baltimore County.)	Petty treason-Murder	Robert Kimball, white (Abigail's husband)	Sir Lionel Copley
William Luffman	White		M	December 1692	St. Mary's	Petty treason-Murder	Robert Kimball, white (Abigail's husband)	Sir Lionel Copley
Mary Lunt	White		F	May 1693	St. Mary's (Note: Crime committed in Anne Arundel County.)	Murder	Mary Lunt, white (daughter)	Sir Lionel Copley
Jenkin Powell	White		M	October 1693	St. Mary's (Note: Crime committed in Kent County.)	Murder	John Smith, Asian	Nicholas Greenberry
Unknown	Native American		M	July 1696	Anne Arundel	?		Francis Nicholson

== 1700–1799 ==
Name	Race	Age	Sex	Date of execution	County	Crime	Victim(s)	Governor
John Bracher	White		M	April 1701	Anne Arundel	Murder	Samuel Glassaway, white	Nathaniel Blakiston
Three unknowns	White		M	May 1701	Anne Arundel	?		Nathaniel Blakiston
George Groves	White		M	October 1702	Anne Arundel	Murder	Sarah Russell, white	Thomas Tench
William Ward	White		M	May 1703	Anne Arundel	Murder		Thomas Tench
Margaret Ward	White		F	May 1703	Anne Arundel	Murder		Thomas Tench
Tom	Black		M	October 1705	Anne Arundel	Rape	Sarah Murphy, 13, white	John Seymour
David Blake	White		M	January 1706	Anne Arundel	?		John Seymour
James Pride	White		M	January 1706	Anne Arundel	?		John Seymour
John Patterson	White		M	August 1706	Anne Arundel	Murder	Thomas Randshaw, white	John Seymour
George Adams	White		M	May 1707	Anne Arundel (Note: Caine's crime was committed in Prince George's County.)	Burglary	Thomas Bladen, white	John Seymour
Thomas Peacock	White		M	May 1707	Anne Arundel	Burglary	Thomas Bladen, white	John Seymour
Margaret Caine	White		F	May 1707	Anne Arundel	Murder	Her illegitimate twin infants, white	John Seymour
Griffin Morris	White		M	October 1707	Anne Arundel	Burglary	Richard Young, white	John Seymour
Richard Clark	White		M	April 8, 1708 (Note: Drawn and quartered.)	Anne Arundel	High treason		John Seymour
Elizabeth Williams	White		F	April 1710	Anne Arundel	Burglary	Thomas Lowra, white	Edward Lloyd
Will	Black		M	1711	Dorchester	Uncertain		Edward Lloyd
Montillion	Black		M	September 1711	Baltimore	Murder	Zachariah Brown, white	Edward Lloyd
Boatswain	Black		M	December 1711	Baltimore	Murder		Edward Lloyd
Hector	Black		M	April 1712	Anne Arundel (Note: Crime committed in Baltimore County.)	Murder	Zachariah Brown, white	Edward Lloyd
Elizabeth Spurrier	White		F	November 1713	Anne Arundel (Note: Crimes committed in Talbot and Queen Anne's County, respectively.)	Murder	Her infant son, white	Edward Lloyd
Sarah Tracy	White		F	November 1713	Anne Arundel	Murder	Mary Fitzpatrick, white	Edward Lloyd
Mingo	Black		M	August 1718	Anne Arundel	Storehouse robbery	John Worthington, white	John Hart
John DuVall	White		M	May 1719	Anne Arundel (Note: Crimes committed in Prince George's and Charles County, respectively.)	Murder	Thomas Clark, white	John Hart
Sambo	Black		M	May 1719	Anne Arundel	Burglary	William Penn, white	John Hart
Hugh Marr	White		M	November 1719	Anne Arundel (Note: Crime committed in Prince George's County.)	Rape	Avaria Bly, white	John Hart
Philip Long	White		M	May 1720	Anne Arundel (Note: Crimes committed in Prince George's and Baltimore County respectively.)	Burglary	Thomas Gatewood, white	John Hart
William Perry	White		M	May 1720	Anne Arundel	Murder	Eleanor Hind, infant, white (illegitimate daughter)	John Hart
John Hutchins	White		M	October 1720	Anne Arundel	Burglary	Sarah Brice, white	Charles Calvert
Thomas Wright	White		M	October 1720	Anne Arundel	Burglary	Sarah Brice, white	Charles Calvert
Edward Divine	White		M	May 1721	Anne Arundel (Note: Divine's crime was committed in Kent County. Strickland et al.'s crime was committed in Kent County.)	Burglary	William Davis, white	Charles Calvert
Frances Horne	White		F	May 1721	Anne Arundel	Burglary	James Carroll, white	Charles Calvert
Joseph Stiff	White		M	May 1721	Anne Arundel	Arson	Richard Beckett, white	Charles Calvert
John Boswell	White		M	May 1721	Anne Arundel	Burglary	Josias Lanham, white	Charles Calvert
John Holmstead	White		M	May 1721	Anne Arundel	Burglary	Josias Lanham, white	Charles Calvert
Thomas Peign	White		M	May 1721	Anne Arundel	Burglary	Josias Lanham, white	Charles Calvert
Robert Strickland	White		M	May 1721	Anne Arundel	Burglary	Josias Lanham, white	Charles Calvert
Daniel	Mixed (Note: Mulatto.)		M	November 1721	Anne Arundel (Note: Daniel's crime was committed in Prince George's County. Lee's crime was committed in Prince George's County. Ragg's crime was committed in Baltimore County. Sodman's crime was committed in Kent County.)	Burglary	Charles Finley, white	Charles Calvert
John Ford	White		M	November 1721	Anne Arundel	Storehouse robbery	John Evans, white	Charles Calvert
Elizabeth Jones	White		F	November 1721	Anne Arundel	Storehouse robbery	John Evans, white	Charles Calvert
John Plant	White		M	November 1721	Anne Arundel	Storehouse robbery	John Evans, white	Charles Calvert
Benjamin Moxon	White		M	November 1721	Anne Arundel	Storehouse robbery	John Evans, white	Charles Calvert
John Woodworth	White		M	November 1721	Anne Arundel	Storehouse robbery	John Evans, white	Charles Calvert
Richard Lee	White		M	November 1721	Anne Arundel	Burglary	Isabelle Sindere, white	Charles Calvert
Isaac Ragg	White		M	November 1721	Anne Arundel	Storehouse robbery	John Bolt, white	Charles Calvert
Thomas Sodman	White		M	November 1721	Anne Arundel	Burglary	Roger Murphy, white	Charles Calvert
William Burston	White		M	May 1722	Anne Arundel (Note: Burston and Goodman's crimes were committed separately at the same location in Prince George's County. Rogers' crime was committed in Baltimore County.)	Storehouse robbery	Thomas Sprigg, white	Charles Calvert
John Goodman	White		M	May 1722	Anne Arundel	Burglary	Thomas Sprigg, white	Charles Calvert
Thomas Lazenby	White		M	May 1722	Anne Arundel	Storehouse robbery	John Abbington, white	Charles Calvert
George Rogers	White		M	May 1722	Anne Arundel	Burglary	John Hammond, white	Charles Calvert
John Butler	White		M	October 1722	Anne Arundel (Note: Butler's crime was committed in St. Mary's County.)	Murder	Catherine Pine, white	Charles Calvert
Peter Fagan	White		M	October 1722	Anne Arundel	Burglary	William Worthington, white	Charles Calvert
Anne Robinson	White		F	October 1722	Anne Arundel	Burglary	Henry Bateman, white	Charles Calvert
Jasper Andrews	White		M	May 1723	Anne Arundel (Note: Bruington et al.'s crime was committed in Baltimore County. Bristoe's crime was committed in Charles County. Carrah's crime was committed in Queen Anne's County. Williams' crime was committed in Kent County.)	Burglary	Edward Earp, white	Charles Calvert
John Brunington	White		M	May 1723	Anne Arundel	Burglary	Edward Earp, white	Charles Calvert
James Jones	White		M	May 1723	Anne Arundel	Burglary	Edward Earp, white	Charles Calvert
Bristoe	Black		M	May 1723	Anne Arundel	Burglary	Robert Holt, white	Charles Calvert
Eleanor Carrah	White		F	May 1723	Anne Arundel	Burglary	John Bartholomew, white	Charles Calvert
William Gordon	White		M	May 1723	Anne Arundel	Burglary	Thomas Sprigg, white	Charles Calvert
Hannah	Black		F	May 1723	Anne Arundel	Murder	Samuel Galloway, white	Charles Calvert
Mary Reed	White		F	May 1723	Anne Arundel	Privately stealing	Peter and Mary Oworard, white	Charles Calvert
John Williams	White		M	May 1723	Anne Arundel	Burglary	James Norman, white	Charles Calvert
Robert Abbott	White		M	October 1723	Anne Arundel (Note: Abbott's crime was committed in Baltimore County. Bishop's crime was committed in Prince George's County. Gibbon's crime was committed in Baltimore County.)	Burglary	Floyd Harris, white	Charles Calvert
Henry Bishop	White		M	October 1723	Anne Arundel	Murder	Mathias Waller, white	Charles Calvert
Mary Burrass	White		M	October 1723	Anne Arundel	Privately stealing	Darby Lux, white	Charles Calvert
Mary Mounting	White		F	October 1723	Anne Arundel	Privately stealing	Darby Lux, white	Charles Calvert
Thomas Gibbon	White		M	October 1723	Anne Arundel	Burglary	Edward Foley, white	Charles Calvert
Robert Dutch	White		M	June 19, 1724	Cecil	?		Charles Calvert
Patrick Dennison	White		M	November 27, 1726	Talbot	Burglary		Charles Calvert
Thomas Jones	White		M	November 27, 1726	Talbot	Burglary		Charles Calvert
John Martin	White		M	November 27, 1726	Prince George's	Burglary		Charles Calvert
Mary Jackson	White		F	March 1727	Kent	Murder	A young child, white	Charles Calvert
John Weldon	White		M	May 8, 1727	Anne Arundel	?		Charles Calvert
Richard Lane	White		M	February 1, 1728	Calvert	Murder		Benedict Leonard Calvert
Tom	Black		M	November 15, 1728	Cecil	Murder	Unknown, white	Benedict Leonard Calvert
Jack	Black		M	December 16, 1728	Charles	Burglary		Benedict Leonard Calvert
Jupiter	Black		M	December 16, 1728	Charles	Burglary		Benedict Leonard Calvert
Pompey	Black		M	December 16, 1728	Charles	Burglary		Benedict Leonard Calvert
Parraway	Black		M	April 18, 1729	Prince George's	Murder	Mrs. John Aldridge and her two children, white	Benedict Leonard Calvert
Corra	Black		M	May 16, 1729	Baltimore	Murder	Aquila Hall, white (owner)	Benedict Leonard Calvert
Richard Dowman	White		M	May 19, 1729	Talbot	?		Benedict Leonard Calvert
Thomas Garnett	White		M	May 19, 1729	Talbot	?		Benedict Leonard Calvert
Charles Smith	White		M	May 19, 1729	Talbot	?		Benedict Leonard Calvert
Babb	Black		M	June 17, 1729	Kent	Burglary		Benedict Leonard Calvert
James Boardman	White		M	November 25, 1730	Prince George's	?		Benedict Leonard Calvert
Coacko	Black		M	November 25, 1730	Prince George's	?		Benedict Leonard Calvert
Richard Townsin	White		M	June 23, 1731	Baltimore	?		Samuel Ogle
Thomas Burke	White		M	January 28, 1732	Charles	?		Samuel Ogle
Henry Hall	White		M	January 28, 1732	Talbot	?		Samuel Ogle
Ben	Black		M	November 10, 1732	Prince George's	?		Charles Calvert, 5th Baron Baltimore
Tom Latter	White		M	November 10, 1732	Prince George's	?		Charles Calvert, 5th Baron Baltimore
Stepney	Black		M	May 16, 1733	Charles	Rape		Charles Calvert, 5th Baron Baltimore
Tom	Black		M	October 3, 1733	Anne Arundel	?		Samuel Ogle
John Bennett	White		M	November 14, 1733	Prince George's	?		Samuel Ogle
Harry	Black		M	November 14, 1733	Prince George's	?		Samuel Ogle
Thomas Collins	White		M	November 8, 1734	Anne Arundel	Burglary		Samuel Ogle
Thomas Johnson	White		M	November 8, 1734	Anne Arundel	Burglary		Samuel Ogle
Charles Lynch	White		M	November 8, 1734	Anne Arundel	Burglary		Samuel Ogle
Michael Aley	White		M	January 16, 1735	Queen Anne's	?		Samuel Ogle
Daniel Sullivan	White		M	August 1, 1735	Cecil	?		Samuel Ogle
Anthony	Black		M	November 10, 1736	St. Mary's	?		Samuel Ogle
John Brewer	White		M	November 10, 1736	Prince George's	Storehouse robbery	Jeremiah Belt, white	Samuel Ogle
Sam	Black		M	November 10, 1736	Prince George's	?		Samuel Ogle
Tango	Black		M	November 10, 1736	Prince George's	?		Samuel Ogle
Kildare	Black		M	November 10, 1736	Anne Arundel	?		Samuel Ogle
Jacob Tinmore	White		M	November 10, 1736	Anne Arundel	?		Samuel Ogle
Jeremiah Lillie	White		M	November 10, 1736	Somerset	?		Samuel Ogle
Chloe	Black		F	May 27, 1737	Anne Arundel	?		Samuel Ogle
Jack	Black		M	May 27, 1737	Anne Arundel	?		Samuel Ogle
Jago	Black		M	May 27, 1737	Anne Arundel	?		Samuel Ogle
Richard Wright	White		M	May 27, 1737	Anne Arundel	?		Samuel Ogle
Jack	Native American		M	May 27, 1737	Prince George's	?		Samuel Ogle
Mary Finmore	White		F	June 1, 1737	Queen Anne's	?		Samuel Ogle
Jack	Black		M	June 1, 1737	Charles	?		Samuel Ogle
Henry Murphy	White		M	November 16, 1737	Charles	?		Samuel Ogle
John Mason	White		M	May 26, 1738	Baltimore	Burglary		Samuel Ogle
Bess	Black		F	June 7, 1738	Prince George's	Poisoning	John Beale, white (owner)	Samuel Ogle
Lot	Black		M	June 7, 1738	Prince George's	Poisoning	John Beale, white (owner)	Samuel Ogle
James Wood	White		M	November 15, 1738	Charles	Burglary		Samuel Ogle
Charles	Black		M	December 20, 1738	Calvert	?		Samuel Ogle
Jack	Black		M	February 23, 1739	Anne Arundel	Murder		Samuel Ogle
Ralph Jones	White		M	February 23, 1739	Anne Arundel	Burglary		Samuel Ogle
Judy	Black		F	March 30, 1739	St. Mary's	Conspiracy to poison	Male, white (overseer)	Samuel Ogle
Pompey	Black		M	March 30, 1739	St. Mary's	Conspiracy to poison	Male, white (overseer)	Samuel Ogle
John Watson	White		M	May 31, 1739	St. Mary's	Burglary	Capt. Stoleman, white	Samuel Ogle
Jupiter	Black		M	July 25, 1739	St. Mary's	?		Samuel Ogle
Richard Giant	White		M	August 17, 1739	Queen Anne's	Murder		Samuel Ogle
Robin	Black		M	August 29, 1739	Anne Arundel	Rape		Samuel Ogle
Robin	Black		M	August 29, 1739	Anne Arundel	Burglary		Samuel Ogle
James Cating	White		M	November 7, 1739	Kent	?		Samuel Ogle
Caesar	Black		M	December 21, 1739	Baltimore	Murder	Hagar, black	Samuel Ogle
Abraham	Black		M	March 26, 1740	Anne Arundel	Burglary	Mary Ragan, white	Samuel Ogle
Jack Ransom	Black		M	April 4, 1740	Prince George's	Slave revolt		Samuel Ogle
Hannibal	Black		M	December 26, 1740	Charles	Rape		Samuel Ogle
Davy	Black		M	January 14, 1741	Prince George's	Burglary	Bridget Clarvo, white	Samuel Ogle
Nicholas Broaley	White		M	March 6, 1741	Kent	Burglary		Samuel Ogle
Job Morgan	White		M	March 6, 1741	Kent	Burglary		Samuel Ogle
John Pinkstone	White		M	March 6, 1741	Kent	Burglary		Samuel Ogle
Judith	Black		F	March 13, 1741	Queen Anne's	Petty treason-Murder	Edward Harris, white (owner)	Samuel Ogle
John Jones	White		M	May 15, 1741	Anne Arundel (Note: Jones' crime was committed in Prince George's County.)	Privately stealing	Richard Lee, white	Samuel Ogle
Sam	Black		M	May 15, 1741	Anne Arundel	Storehouse robbery	Richard Snowden, white	Samuel Ogle
Ben	Black		M	April 28, 1742	Calvert	Murder	Jeremiah Pattison, white (owner)	Samuel Ogle
Caesar	Black		M	April 28, 1742	Calvert	Murder	Jeremiah Pattison, white (owner)	Samuel Ogle
Charles	Black		M	April 28, 1742	Calvert	Murder	Jeremiah Pattison, white (owner)	Samuel Ogle
Cooper	Black		M	April 28, 1742	Calvert	Murder	Jeremiah Pattison, white (owner)	Samuel Ogle
Marlborough	Black		M	April 28, 1742	Calvert	Murder	Jeremiah Pattison, white (owner)	Samuel Ogle
Moll	Black		F	April 28, 1742	Calvert	Murder	Jeremiah Pattison, white (owner)	Samuel Ogle
Seamore	Black		M	April 28, 1742	Anne Arundel	Murder	Jeremiah Pattison, white (owner)	Samuel Ogle
Peter Coleman	White		M	May 15, 1742	Dorchester	?		Samuel Ogle
Nacy	Black		M	July 2, 1742	Charles	Burglary	Charity Carver, white	Thomas Bladen
George Roberts	White		M	August 4, 1742	Anne Arundel (Note: Change of venue from Charles County.)	Murder	James Taylor, 1, white	Thomas Bladen
Liverpool	Black		M	December 6, 1742	Somerset	Rape		Thomas Bladen
Tom	Black		M	December 6, 1742	Somerset	Rape		Thomas Bladen
Mingo	Black		M	February 2, 1743	Kent	?		Thomas Bladen
John Lilleston	White		M	June 15, 1743	Anne Arundel	Burglary		Thomas Bladen
Harry	Black		M	July 1, 1743	Prince George's	Murder	Male, Native American	Thomas Bladen
Jack	Black		M	July 1, 1743	Prince George's	Murder	Male, Native American	Thomas Bladen
Frank	Black		M	July 22, 1743	Anne Arundel	Storehouse robbery	Philip Hammond, white (owner)	Thomas Bladen
Jack	Black		M	July 22, 1743	Anne Arundel	Storehouse robbery	Philip Hammond, white (owner)	Thomas Bladen
William Hills	White		M	August 26, 1743	Prince George's	Murder		Thomas Bladen
Peter	Black		M	November 22, 1743	St. Mary's	Burglary		Thomas Bladen
John Malcolm	White		M	December 23, 1743	Anne Arundel (Note: Taylor's crime was committed in Cecil County.)	Counterfeiting	N/A	Thomas Bladen
Alexander Taylor	White		M	December 23, 1743	Anne Arundel	Murder	Hester Taylor, white (wife)	Thomas Bladen
James	Black		M	June 6, 1744	Charles	?		Thomas Bladen
Will	Black		M	August 17, 1744	Prince George's	Storehouse robbery	William Murdock, white	Thomas Bladen
Roger Crooke	White		M	October 31, 1744	Anne Arundel (Note: Crimes committed in Charles and Prince George's County, respectively.)	Horse stealing	Richard Gildart, white	Thomas Bladen
Robert Davis	White		M	October 31, 1744	Anne Arundel	Storehouse robbery	Three people, white (Note: David Traile, William Cecil, and John Rowe.)	Thomas Bladen
James Barrett	White		M	May 11, 1745	Anne Arundel	Murder		Thomas Bladen
Cato	Black		M	July 26, 1745	Talbot	Murder	Male, white (overseer)	Thomas Bladen
Jerry	Black		M	January 3, 1746	Prince George's	Storehouse robbery	William Manduit, white	Thomas Bladen
Quod	Black		M	January 3, 1746	Prince George's	Storehouse robbery	William Manduit, white	Thomas Bladen
Esther Anderson	White		F	May 13, 1746 (Note: Esther Anderson was burned alive.)	Kent	Petty treason-Murder	Richard Waters, white	Thomas Bladen
Hector Grant	White		M	May 13, 1746	Kent	Petty treason-Murder	Richard Waters, white	Thomas Bladen
James Horney	White		M	May 13, 1746	Kent	Petty treason-Murder	Richard Waters, white	Thomas Bladen
Ned	Black		M	July 11, 1746	Somerset	Storehouse robbery	Robert Jenkins Henry, white (owner)	Samuel Ogle
Thomas Lamb	White		M	May 13, 1747	Prince George's	Murder	Nacey, mixed (Note: Mulatto.)	Samuel Ogle
Tom	Black		M	June 28, 1747	Anne Arundel	Burglary		Samuel Ogle
Joe	Black		M	November 27, 1747	Baltimore	Rape		Samuel Ogle
York	Black		M	December 9, 1747	Anne Arundel	Horse stealing		Samuel Ogle
Thomas Hill	White		M	August 19, 1748	Prince George's	Burglary		Samuel Ogle
Jack	Mixed (Note: Mulatto.)		M	August 19, 1748	Prince George's	Horse stealing		Samuel Ogle
Joseph Humes	White		M	September 21, 1748	Anne Arundel (Note: Lapear's crime was committed in Baltimore County.)	Burglary	Lyde Goodwin, white	Samuel Ogle
Matthew Lapear	White		M	September 21, 1748	Anne Arundel	Storehouse robbery	Dr. James Walker, white	Samuel Ogle
Unknown	Black		M	September 28, 1748	Cecil	Murder	Female, black (wife)	Samuel Ogle
James	Mixed (Note: Mulatto.)		M	October 28, 1748	Charles	Burglary		Samuel Ogle
William Diskins	White		M	December 21, 1748	Prince George's	Horse stealing		Samuel Ogle
Tom	Black		M	December 21, 1748	Prince George's	Murder	Unknown, black	Samuel Ogle
William James	White		M	May 31, 1749	Baltimore	Storehouse robbery	William Dallam, white	Samuel Ogle
George Simonette	White		M	May 31, 1749	Baltimore	Storehouse robbery	William Dallam, white	Samuel Ogle
Jack	Black		M	December 13, 1749	Calvert	Rape		Samuel Ogle
John Murphy	White		M	December 15, 1749	Frederick	Burglary		Samuel Ogle
Carolina	Black		M	December 22, 1749	Cecil	Arson	John McDermott, white (owner)	Samuel Ogle
Enos Carty	White		M	March 14, 1750	Cecil	Murder	Hugh Mahaffy Jr., white	Samuel Ogle
Jack	Black		M	May 25, 1750	Worcester	Burglary		Samuel Ogle
Thomas Richards	White		M	June 20, 1750	Prince George's	Horse stealing		Samuel Ogle
Cuffee	Black		M	August 30, 1750	Anne Arundel	Horse stealing		Samuel Ogle
James	Black		M	December 14, 1750	Charles	Storehouse robbery	Mr. Mitchell, white	Samuel Ogle
Robert Rustin	Black		M	December 14, 1750	Charles	Storehouse robbery	Mr. Mitchell, white	Samuel Ogle
Joe	Mixed (Note: Mulatto.)		M	February 1, 1751	Cecil	Murder	Male, white (owner)	Samuel Ogle
Grace	Black		F	April 10, 1751	Anne Arundel	Arson	Joseph Galloway, white (owner)	Samuel Ogle
Jenny	Black		F	April 10, 1751	Anne Arundel	Arson	Joseph Galloway, white (owner)	Samuel Ogle
Tangio	Black		M	April 12, 1751	Calvert	Burglary		Samuel Ogle
John Steadman	White	54	M	April 17, 1751	Anne Arundel (Note: Sullivan's crime was committed in Baltimore County.)	Murder	Female, white (wife)	Samuel Ogle
David Sullivan	White	23	M	April 17, 1751	Anne Arundel	Murder	Donald McKennie, white	Samuel Ogle
Sharper	Black		M	April 22, 1751	Dorchester	Rape	Elizabeth Hull, white	Samuel Ogle
Jeremiah Swift	White		M	April 29, 1751	Anne Arundel	Murder		Samuel Ogle
Jacob Windsor	White		M	June 10, 1751	Queen Anne's	Horse stealing		Samuel Ogle
Onesiphorus Lucas	White		M	June 26, 1751	Anne Arundel	Burglary		Samuel Ogle
Thomas Bavin	White		M	November 1, 1751	Anne Arundel	Burglary		Samuel Ogle
Ben	Black		M	December 6, 1751	St. Mary's	Burglary		Samuel Ogle
Martha Bassett	White		F	January 10, 1752	Baltimore	Murder	Sarah Clark, white	Samuel Ogle
Mary Powell	White		F	January 10, 1752	Baltimore	Murder	Sarah Clark, white	Samuel Ogle
John Berry	White		M	January 15, 1752	Baltimore	Murder	Sarah Clark, white	Samuel Ogle
Thomas Hornbrook	White		M	May 19, 1752	Baltimore	Horse stealing		Samuel Ogle
James Powell	White	39	M	May 19, 1752	Anne Arundel	Burglary		Samuel Ogle
George Wilson	White		M	June 5, 1752	St. Mary's	Murder	Capt. Smith, white	Benjamin Tasker
John Batter	White		M	August 28, 1752	Cecil	Burglary		Benjamin Tasker
Terrence Connor	White		M	October 19, 1752	Anne Arundel (Note: Crime committed in Frederick County.)	Murder	James Boyles, white	Benjamin Tasker
Joe	Black		M	October 20, 1752	Talbot	Burglary		Benjamin Tasker
William Rice	White		M	December 29, 1752	Cecil	Burglary		Benjamin Tasker
John Brown	White		M	May 16, 1753	Anne Arundel	Burglary		Benjamin Tasker
Charles Campbell	White		M	May 16, 1753	Anne Arundel	Burglary	Edmund Trafford, white	Benjamin Tasker
Daniel Spinkse	White		M	May 16, 1753	Anne Arundel	Burglary	Edmund Trafford, white	Benjamin Tasker
Jack	Black		M	June 13, 1753	Somerset	Insurrection		Horatio Sharpe
John Barrett	White		M	December 4, 1753	Baltimore	Murder	Female, white (wife)	Horatio Sharpe
Phil	Black		M	March 27, 1754	Anne Arundel	Horse stealing		Horatio Sharpe
James	Mixed (Note: Mulatto.)		M	May 3, 1754	St. Mary's	Murder-Rape	Mary Hambleton, 12, white (Note: Also confessed to murdering a widow named Wessels.)	Horatio Sharpe
Samuel Knowler	White		M	May 24, 1754	Charles	Burglary		Horatio Sharpe
Yellow Dick	Mixed (Note: Mulatto.)		M	May 24, 1754	Charles	Burglary		Horatio Sharpe
Caesar	Black		M	July 3, 1754	Anne Arundel	Personal robbery	Duncan Robertson and Mary Suttor, white	Horatio Sharpe
Tom	Black		M	July 3, 1754	Anne Arundel	Personal robbery	Duncan Robertson and Mary Suttor, white	Horatio Sharpe
Toney	Mixed (Note: Mulatto.)		M	August 7, 1754	Anne Arundel	Murder	Capt. William Curtis, white	Horatio Sharpe
John Wright	White		M	August 7, 1754	Anne Arundel	Murder	Capt. William Curtis, white	Horatio Sharpe
Pompey	Black		M	September 20, 1754	Anne Arundel	Storehouse robbery		Horatio Sharpe
John Williams	White		M	November 22, 1754	Frederick	Horse stealing		Horatio Sharpe
London	Black		M	December 27, 1754	St. Mary's	?		Horatio Sharpe
Joe	Black		M	March 26, 1755	Anne Arundel	Murder	Richard Price, white (overseer)	Horatio Sharpe
Edward Brease	White		M	May 15, 1755	Kent	Storehouse robbery	Capt. Marsh, white	Horatio Sharpe
John Roberts	White		M	May 15, 1755	Kent	Storehouse robbery	Capt. Marsh, white	Horatio Sharpe
Dick	Black		M	July 4, 1755	Charles	Burglary	George Keech, white	Horatio Sharpe
Jack	Black		M	July 4, 1755	Charles	Attempted poisoning	Francis Clements, white (owner)	Horatio Sharpe
Jemmy	Black		F	July 4, 1755	Charles	Murder	Jeremiah Chase, white (Jemmy and Anthony's owner)	Horatio Sharpe
William Stratton	White		M	July 4, 1755	Charles	Murder	Jeremiah Chase, white (Jemmy and Anthony's owner)	Horatio Sharpe
Anthony	Black		M	July 4, 1755	Charles	Murder	Jeremiah Chase, white (Jemmy and Anthony's owner)	Horatio Sharpe
Bob	Mixed (Note: Mulatto.)		M	September 19, 1755	St. Mary's	Burglary		Horatio Sharpe
Harry	Black		M	October 31, 1755	St. Mary's	Conspiracy to poison	Dr. John Key, white	Horatio Sharpe
Cork	Black		M	November 12, 1755	St. Mary's	Conspiracy to poison	Dr. John Key, white	Horatio Sharpe
Joe	Black		M	January 16, 1756	St. Mary's	Storehouse robbery	Mr. Eden, white	Horatio Sharpe
John Christopher	White		M	May 14, 1756	Queen Anne's	Burglary		Horatio Sharpe
Jack	Black		M	May 14, 1756	Kent	Storehouse robbery		Horatio Sharpe
Ben	Black		M	September 3, 1756	Charles	?		Horatio Sharpe
Simon	Black		M	January 28, 1757	Worcester	Burglary	(Note: Believed to have been previously sentenced to death for burglary but pardoned.)	Horatio Sharpe
Tida	Black		F	April 6, 1757	Anne Arundel	Attempted poisoning	Ephraim Glover, white (owner) (Note: Also tried for trying to poison a black man.)	Horatio Sharpe
Booze	Black		M	April 13, 1757	Dorchester	Burglary		Horatio Sharpe
John Grimshaw	White		M	May 27, 1757	Prince George's	Burglary		Horatio Sharpe
Caleb	Black		M	September 2, 1757	Baltimore	Conspiracy to poison	Susannah Gist, white	Horatio Sharpe
London	Black		M	September 2, 1757	Calvert	Storehouse robbery		Horatio Sharpe
Reuben	Black		M	September 2, 1757	Calvert	Storehouse robbery		Horatio Sharpe
Maurice Mongall	White		M	November 9, 1758	Baltimore	Storehouse robbery	Capt. Richard Hayton, white	Horatio Sharpe
Tomboy	Black		M	August 25, 1759	Baltimore	Horse stealing		Horatio Sharpe
Matthew Dugan	White		M	October 7, 1759	Kent	Murder	Female, white (wife)	Horatio Sharpe
John Burke	White		M	November 14, 1759	Queen Anne's	Murder	Female, white (wife)	Horatio Sharpe
James Horner	White		M	April 30, 1760	Dorchester	Rape	Mary Anne Sachell, 14, white	Horatio Sharpe
John Harrison	White		M	October 17, 1760	Frederick	Horse stealing		Horatio Sharpe
Peter	Black		M	June 8, 1761	St. Mary's	Murder	Mrs. John Booth and her child, white	Horatio Sharpe
Roger	Mixed (Note: Mulatto.)		M	July 31, 1761	Calvert	Storehouse robbery	James Weems Sr., white	Horatio Sharpe
Rachel	Black		F	October 7, 1761	Calvert	Attempted poisoning	Mrs. Smith, white	Horatio Sharpe
Samuel	Black		M	October 7, 1761	Calvert	Attempted poisoning	Mrs. Smith, white	Horatio Sharpe
Tony	Black		M	October 23, 1761	Prince George's	Storehouse robbery	James Russell, white	Horatio Sharpe
Cuffee	Black		M	May 5, 1762	Anne Arundel	Murder	Alexander Elder, white (owner)	Horatio Sharpe
Michael Oroonoko	Native American		M	May 7, 1762	Cecil	Murder		Horatio Sharpe
Richard Crosby	White		M	May 26, 1762	Frederick	Murder	Uriah Mort, elderly, white	Horatio Sharpe
Jonathan	Black		M	September 3, 1762	Charles	Burglary	James Previn, white	Horatio Sharpe
Thomas Cooper	White		M	October 8, 1762	Anne Arundel	Storehouse robbery		Horatio Sharpe
Michael Peck	White		M	October 8, 1762	Frederick	Murder	George Jacob Poe, white	Horatio Sharpe
Adam	Black		M	April 8, 1763	St. Mary's	Conspiracy to murder	Capt. Robert Chesley, white (owner)	Horatio Sharpe
Wapping	Black		M	September 28, 1763	Prince George's	Attempted poisoning	Benjamin Brooks, white (owner)	Horatio Sharpe
Jacob	Black		M	May 18, 1764	Baltimore	Storehouse robbery	Gilbert Crockett, white	Horatio Sharpe
Betty	Black		F	June 20, 1764	Calvert	Attempted poisoning	William Hamilton Smith, white (Sambo and Betty's owner) (Note: Also attempted to poison his wife, Barbara.)	Horatio Sharpe
Joe	Black		M	June 20, 1764	Calvert	Attempted poisoning	William Hamilton Smith, white (Sambo and Betty's owner)	Horatio Sharpe
Sambo	Black		M	June 20, 1764	Calvert	Attempted poisoning	William Hamilton Smith, white (Sambo and Betty's owner)	Horatio Sharpe
Davy	Black		M	July 25, 1764	Queen Anne's	Murder	John Sevil, white (overseer)	Horatio Sharpe
Stephen	Black		M	July 27, 1764	Baltimore	Burglary	John Stephenson, white (owner)	Horatio Sharpe
Jacob	Black		M	October 4, 1764	Baltimore (Note: Executed at Spesutie Island, now in Harford County.)	Rape	Female, white	Horatio Sharpe
John Hubbert	White		M	October 4, 1765	Anne Arundel	Murder	James Hood Jr., white	Horatio Sharpe
Edward Rudgeking	White		M	October 4, 1765	Anne Arundel	Murder	Henry Landshare, white	Horatio Sharpe
Tom	Black		M	November 2, 1765	Prince George's	Murder		Horatio Sharpe
Caesar	Black		M	December 27, 1765	Baltimore	Arson	John Bosley, white	Horatio Sharpe
Jack	Black		M	April 30, 1766	Charles	Murder	William Garner, white	Horatio Sharpe
Beck	Black		F	June 4, 1766	Calvert	Arson	Joseph Smith, white (owner)	Horatio Sharpe
Patrick McKenzie	White		M	October 15, 1766	Baltimore	Horse stealing		Horatio Sharpe
David	Black		M	January 14, 1767	Talbot	Attempted poisoning	Samuel Mulliken, white (owner)	Horatio Sharpe
Nero	Black		M	January 14, 1767	Talbot	Burglary	Nathaniel Coxe, white	Horatio Sharpe
Daniel Dunn	White		M	January 28, 1767	Frederick	Highway robbery		Horatio Sharpe
Glasgow	Black		M	May 6, 1767	Dorchester	Poisoning		Horatio Sharpe
Thomas Hulme	White		M	June 26, 1767	Dorchester	Burglary	William Ennalls, white	Horatio Sharpe
Toby	Black		M	June 26, 1767	Dorchester	Burglary	William Ennalls, white	Horatio Sharpe
Levi Thompson	White		M	July 8, 1767	Somerset	Murder	Jacob Ayres and Scipio, white and black	Horatio Sharpe
Sam	Black		M	September 7, 1768	Anne Arundel	Burglary		Horatio Sharpe
Daniel	Black		M	September 9, 1768	Dorchester	Burglary		Horatio Sharpe
Joseph Frampton	White		M	September 9, 1768	Frederick	Burglary		Horatio Sharpe
Dennis Igoe	White		M	September 9, 1768	Frederick	Burglary		Horatio Sharpe
James Johnson	White		M	September 9, 1768	Frederick	Burglary		Horatio Sharpe
Philip Fitzgerald	White		M	December 14, 1768	Dorchester	?		Horatio Sharpe
David	Black		M	August 9, 1769	Charles	Rape	Sarah Smith, white	Sir Robert Eden, 1st Baronet, of Maryland
Jack	Mixed (Note: Mulatto.)		M	September 8, 1769	Prince George's	Rape-Burglary		Sir Robert Eden, 1st Baronet, of Maryland
Pompey	Black		M	October 6, 1769	Charles	Attempted poisoning	Leonard Burch, white	Sir Robert Eden, 1st Baronet, of Maryland
John Stinson	White		M	October 22, 1769	Baltimore (Note: First execution in Baltimore City. Previous executions in Baltimore County were usually carried out at Joppa, now part of Harford County.)	Burglary	Levin Roberts, white	Sir Robert Eden, 1st Baronet, of Maryland
Tom	Black		M	May 2, 1770	Somerset	Murder	Job, black	Sir Robert Eden, 1st Baronet, of Maryland
Samuel Pelton	Native American		M	May 25, 1770	Frederick	Murder	Abraham Keller, white	Sir Robert Eden, 1st Baronet, of Maryland
Jack Crain	Black		M	July 4, 1770	Prince George's	Murder	William Elson, white (overseer)	Sir Robert Eden, 1st Baronet, of Maryland
Davy	Black		M	July 4, 1770	Prince George's	Murder	William Elson, white (overseer)	Sir Robert Eden, 1st Baronet, of Maryland
Jack Wood	Black		M	July 4, 1770	Prince George's	Murder	William Elson, white (overseer)	Sir Robert Eden, 1st Baronet, of Maryland
John Jones	White		M	October 1770	Kent	Slave stealing	Sarah and Jem, black	Sir Robert Eden, 1st Baronet, of Maryland
John Boswell	White		M	October 11, 1770	Anne Arundel	Burglary	Daniel of St. Thomas Jennifer, white	Sir Robert Eden, 1st Baronet, of Maryland
Francis Chase	White		M	October 11, 1770	Anne Arundel	Burglary	Daniel of St. Thomas Jennifer, white	Sir Robert Eden, 1st Baronet, of Maryland
David	Black		M	October 19, 1770	Charles	?		Sir Robert Eden, 1st Baronet, of Maryland
Daniel	Black		M	January 23, 1771	Anne Arundel	Burglary		Sir Robert Eden, 1st Baronet, of Maryland
Morris McCoy	White		M	January 23, 1771	Anne Arundel	Murder	Male, white	Sir Robert Eden, 1st Baronet, of Maryland
James Fitzpatrick	White		M	February 1, 1771	Frederick	Murder	Female, white	Sir Robert Eden, 1st Baronet, of Maryland
Roger Mockbee	White		M	February 1, 1771	Frederick	Burglary		Sir Robert Eden, 1st Baronet, of Maryland
Eve	Black		F	March 15, 1771	Queen Anne's	?		Sir Robert Eden, 1st Baronet, of Maryland
Sam Banning	Black		M	July 12, 1771	Queen Anne's	?		Sir Robert Eden, 1st Baronet, of Maryland
Jacob	Black		M	October 16, 1771	Baltimore	?		Sir Robert Eden, 1st Baronet, of Maryland
Michael Woolden	White		M	October 16, 1771	Baltimore	Burglary		Sir Robert Eden, 1st Baronet, of Maryland
Vin	Black		M	October 18, 1771	Dorchester	?		Sir Robert Eden, 1st Baronet, of Maryland
Ben	Black		M	April 30, 1773	Baltimore	Aggravated assault	James Calder, white (owner)	Sir Robert Eden, 1st Baronet, of Maryland
Charles	Black		M	April 30, 1773	Baltimore	Aggravated assault	James Calder, white (owner)	Sir Robert Eden, 1st Baronet, of Maryland
Robert Cooper	White		M	May 21, 1773	Frederick	Murder	John Davis, white (overseer)	Sir Robert Eden, 1st Baronet, of Maryland
John Thatcher	White		M	May 21, 1773	Frederick	Murder	John Davis, white (overseer)	Sir Robert Eden, 1st Baronet, of Maryland
Christopher Chisholm	White		M	October 22, 1773	Frederick	Murder	Archibald Hoffman, white	Sir Robert Eden, 1st Baronet, of Maryland
James Dennon	White		M	October 22, 1773	Frederick	Murder	Archibald Hoffman, white	Sir Robert Eden, 1st Baronet, of Maryland
Cornelius Jacul	White		M	October 22, 1773	Frederick	Murder	Archibald Hoffman, white	Sir Robert Eden, 1st Baronet, of Maryland
Abraham Wright	White		M	October 22, 1773	Frederick	Murder	Archibald Hoffman, white	Sir Robert Eden, 1st Baronet, of Maryland
Caesar	Black		M	September 1, 1775	Prince George's	Arson	George Gantt, white (owner)	Sir Robert Eden, 1st Baronet, of Maryland
Joseph Long	White		M	September 1, 1775	Baltimore	Burglary		Sir Robert Eden, 1st Baronet, of Maryland
Patrick Pearce	White		M	September 1, 1775	Baltimore	Burglary		Sir Robert Eden, 1st Baronet, of Maryland
Jenny	Black		F	November 17, 1775	Calvert	Murder		Sir Robert Eden, 1st Baronet, of Maryland
Miall	Black		M	November 17, 1775	Calvert	Rape		Sir Robert Eden, 1st Baronet, of Maryland
Robin	Black		M	October 1776	Dorchester	Murder	John Woolford, white	N/A
Toby	Black		M	October 1776	Dorchester	Murder	John Woolford, white	N/A
John Beard	White		M	August 1777	Baltimore	Murder	Arabella Beard, white (wife)	N/A
Michael Murphy	White		M	August 1777	Frederick	Murder	Mary Woolton, white	N/A
Peter	Black		M	January 1778	Prince George's	Rape	Ann Newitt, white	N/A
William Clarke	White		M	July 8, 1778	Baltimore	Residential robbery	Sabritt Sollers, white	N/A
George Crowes	White		M	July 8, 1778	Baltimore	Burglary	Robert Johnson, white (Note: Also robbed the storehouse of James Sterling.)	N/A
Matt	Black		M	January 1779	Talbot	Murder	Unknown, black	N/A
Cato	Black		M	April 1779	Anne Arundel	Rape	Hannah Stevens, white	N/A
Thomas Taylor	White		M	November 2, 1780	Washington	Horse stealing		N/A
Thomas Locklan	White		M	March 2, 1781	Baltimore	Highway robbery	Stephen Donnell, white	N/A
Joseph Lowe	White		M	March 2, 1781	Baltimore	Horse stealing		N/A
Caspar Fritchie	White		M	August 17, 1781	Frederick	High treason		N/A
Yost Plecker	White		M	August 17, 1781	Frederick	High treason		N/A
Peter Sueman	White		M	August 17, 1781	Frederick	High treason		N/A
George	Black		M	October 24, 1781	Montgomery	Attempted poisoning	John Beale Howard, white	N/A
Peter	Black		M	October 24, 1781	Montgomery	Attempted poisoning	John Beale Howard, white	N/A
Jacob	Black		M	May 15, 1782	Montgomery	Horse stealing		N/A
Jack	Black		M	June 26, 1782	Charles	Burglary	William Whittier, white	N/A
Judith	Black		F	June 26, 1782	Calvert	Arson	David Crawford, white (owner)	N/A
James	Black		M	December 27, 1782	Worcester	Burglary	John Tull, white	N/A
Joe	Black		M	April 25, 1783	Somerset	Burglary	Outerbridge Harvey, white (owner)	N/A
Paul	Black		M	April 25, 1783	Somerset	Burglary	Outerbridge Harvey, white (owner)	N/A
John Bevan	White		M	May 9, 1783	Worcester	Burglary	Thomas Purnell, white	N/A
Robert Conaway	White		M	November 5, 1783	Baltimore	?		N/A
John Lee	White		M	November 5, 1783	Baltimore	?		N/A
George Riggs	White		M	January 9, 1784	Worcester	Burglary	William Ironshire, white	N/A
Benjamin Furr	White	20	M	June 11, 1784	Frederick	Horse stealing		N/A
Edward Rock	White		M	July 14, 1784	Baltimore	Personal robbery	Philip Hall, white	N/A
Bridget Martin	White		F	July 23, 1784	Baltimore	Murder	Elizabeth Brown, white	N/A
William Marchmont	White		M	October 15, 1784	Dorchester	Burglary	Henry Hooper, white	N/A
William Richards	White		M	October 15, 1784	Dorchester	Burglary	Henry Hooper, white	N/A
Patrick McDonald	White		M	November 26, 1784	Baltimore	Burglary	John Secor and Matthew Swan, white	N/A
Mingo	Black		M	April 6, 1785	Baltimore	Murder	James Saunders, white	N/A
John Brown	White		M	May 18, 1785 (Note: Last person to be posthumously gibbeted in Maryland.)	Talbot	Murder	Thomas Groves, white	N/A
Leander	Black		M	May 12, 1786	Harford	Murder-Burglary	Christiana Polen, black	N/A
Bartholomew Bannim	White		M	December 15, 1786	Worcester	Burglary	Thomas Purnell, white	N/A
Robert Collins	White		M	May 16, 1787	Baltimore	Murder	William Tanner, white	N/A
Stephen	Black		M	October 17, 1787	Frederick	Murder	Mary, black	N/A
John Thompson	White		M	December 21, 1787	Charles	Burglary	William Grindell, white	N/A
Patrick Donnelly	White		M	March 19, 1788	Baltimore	Highway robbery	David Stoddard, white	N/A
Peter Mooney	White		M	March 19, 1788	Baltimore	Highway robbery	David Stoddard, white	N/A
Patrick Cassidy	White		M	February 11, 1789	Baltimore	Murder-Robbery	Capt. John de Corse, white	John Eager Howard
John Webb	White		M	February 11, 1789	Baltimore	Murder-Robbery	Capt. John de Corse, white	John Eager Howard
Isaac	Black		M	March 27, 1789	Dorchester	Murder	Levin Adams, white	John Eager Howard
John Davenport	White		M	April 24, 1789	Queen Anne's	?		John Eager Howard
George Robinson	White		M	May 1, 1789	Queen Anne's	?		John Eager Howard
George	Black		M	August 26, 1789	Charles	Attempted rape	Elizabeth Madden, white	John Eager Howard
Clem	Black		M	September 4, 1789	Charles	Attempted rape	Mary Cromwell, white	John Eager Howard
George	Black		M	March 3, 1790	St. Mary's	Rape	Ann Wherritt, white	John Eager Howard
Charles	Black		M	September 23, 1791	Calvert	Rape	Mary Charlton, white	John Eager Howard
David Rathel	White		M	October 12, 1791	Talbot	Murder	Sarah Rathel, white (wife)	John Eager Howard
Andrew	Black		M	November 16, 1791	Dorchester	Rape	Elizabeth Phillips, white	George Plater
David	Black		M	May 16, 1792	Montgomery	Murder	Mr. (owner) and Mrs. Joseph Ward, white	Thomas Sim Lee
Andrew	Black		M	January 10, 1794	Talbot	Rape	Ann Delaney, white	Thomas Sim Lee
Ned	Black		M	May 8, 1795	Anne Arundel	Murder	Vachel Dorsey, white	John Hoskins Stone
Henry Wheeler	White		M	January 15, 1796	Dorchester	Murder		John Hoskins Stone
Charles	Black		M	January 20, 1797	Baltimore	Murder	Peter, black	John Hoskins Stone
Abram	Black		M	July 28, 1797	Somerset	Murder	Joshua Knight, white	John Hoskins Stone
Draper	Black		M	July 28, 1797	Somerset	Murder	Joshua Knight, white	John Hoskins Stone
Simon	Black		M	December 29, 1797	Kent	Rape	Araminta Pearce, white	John Henry
Peter Jennings	White		M	September 7, 1798	Prince George's	Arson	Robert McGill and Joseph DuVall, white	John Henry
Ben	Black		M	December 1, 1798	Anne Arundel	Murder	Edward Barrett, white (owner)	Benjamin Ogle
Isaac	Black		M	December 17, 1798	Worcester	Murder	John Raikliff, white (owner)	Benjamin Ogle
Emanuel	Black		M	April 12, 1799	Washington	Murder	Mr. Todd, white (road crew overseer)	Benjamin Ogle
Jack	Black		M	April 12, 1799	Washington	Murder	Mr. Todd, white (road crew overseer)	Benjamin Ogle

== 1800–1899 ==
Name	Race	Age	Sex	Date of execution	County	Crime	Victim(s)	Governor
Peter White (Note: Claimed to be free but suspected to be a runaway slave.)	Black (Note: Possibly mixed (mulatto).)		M	November 27, 1801	Caroline	Horse stealing		John Francis Mercer
Domingo Lours	Hispanic		M	September 7, 1802	Baltimore	Murder	James Jones, white	John Francis Mercer
Quamus	Black		M	November 29, 1802	Dorchester	Rape	Fanny Dawson, white	John Francis Mercer
Sam	Black		M	March 30, 1803	Frederick	Murder	Jane, black	John Francis Mercer
John McDaniel	White		M	April 15, 1803	Washington	Burglary		John Francis Mercer
Jack	Black		M	May 18, 1803	Prince George's	Murder	Bryan Higgins, white	John Francis Mercer
Stephen Jay	White		M	January 11, 1804	Prince George's	Murder	Robert Young, white	Robert Bowie
Dennis	Black		M	May 8, 1805	Anne Arundel	Murder	John Fuller, white (owner)	Robert Bowie
Kate	Black		F	May 8, 1805	Anne Arundel	Murder	John Fuller, white (owner)	Robert Bowie
Ned	Black		M	May 8, 1805	Anne Arundel	Murder	John Fuller, white (owner)	Robert Bowie
George	Black		M	May 8, 1805	Anne Arundel	Arson	Charles Pettibone, white (owner)	Robert Bowie
Doss	Black		M	August 9, 1805	Dorchester	Rape	Sarah Smith, white	Robert Bowie
William Morris	White		M	April 22, 1808	Baltimore	Murder	George Workner, white	Robert Wright
William Robinson	White		M	April 22, 1808	Baltimore	Murder	George Workner, white	Robert Wright
Daniel Dougherty	White		M	April 22, 1808	Baltimore	Murder	George Workner, white	Robert Wright
Caleb Dougherty	Black		M	April 22, 1808	Baltimore	Murder	George Workner, white	Robert Wright
John Riggin	White		M	April 22, 1808	Worcester	Burglary		Robert Wright
Frank Johnston	Black		M	November 25, 1808	Montgomery	Accessory to murder	Female, child, black	Robert Wright
Cato	Black		M	November 29, 1809	Queen Anne's	Murder	William Robinson, white	Edward Lloyd
Will	Black		M	November 29, 1809	Queen Anne's	Murder	William Robinson, white	Edward Lloyd
Perry	Mixed (Note: "Dark mulatto.")	24	M	January 12, 1810	Queen Anne's	Murder	William Robinson, white	Edward Lloyd
Ned	Black		M	February 16, 1810	Prince George's	Arson	James McGill, white	Edward Lloyd
Stephen Hersey	White		M	July 13, 1810	Worcester	Murder	John Stevenson, white	Edward Lloyd
Edward Brookes	White		M	October 11, 1811	Anne Arundel	Rape	Elizabeth Roberts, 12, white	Edward Lloyd
John Armstrong	Mixed (Note: "Very bright mulatto.")	30	M	November 6, 1811	Queen Anne's	Murder	William Robinson, white	Edward Lloyd
Aquilla	Black		M	August 21, 1812	Baltimore	Murder	William Fuller, white (owner)	Robert Bowie
Ben	Black		M	August 21, 1812	Baltimore	Murder	William Fuller, white (owner)	Robert Bowie
Jonathan	Black		M	January 26, 1816	Frederick	Murder	Edward E. Owings, white (owner)	Charles Carnan Ridgely
Harry	Black		M	January 26, 1816	Frederick	Murder	Edward E. Owings, white (owner)	Charles Carnan Ridgely
Nimrod	Black		M	January 26, 1816	Frederick	Murder	Edward E. Owings, white (owner)	Charles Carnan Ridgely
Solomon	Black		M	January 26, 1816	Frederick	Murder	Edward E. Owings, white (owner)	Charles Carnan Ridgely
Matthew Chapman	White		M	October 11, 1816	Baltimore	Murder	Mary Chapman, white (wife)	Charles Carnan Ridgely
Jacob	Black		M	October 10, 1817	Montgomery	Murder	John O'Neall, white (owner)	Charles Carnan Ridgely
Dick	Black		M	August 12, 1818	Anne Arundel	Rape		Charles Carnan Ridgely
Joseph Hare	White		M	September 10, 1818	Baltimore (Federal)	Mail robbery		Charles Carnan Ridgely
John Alexander	White		M	September 10, 1818	Baltimore (Federal)	Mail robbery		Charles Carnan Ridgely
John Cotterill	White		M	February 25, 1820	Washington (Note: Change of venue from Montgomery County.)	Murder	Mr. Adams, white	Samuel Sprigg
William Cotterill Sr.	White		M	February 25, 1820	Washington	Murder	Mr. Adams, white	Samuel Sprigg
William Cotterill Jr.	White		M	February 25, 1820	Washington	Murder	Mr. Adams, white	Samuel Sprigg
John Ferguson	White		M	April 13, 1820	Baltimore (Federal)	Piracy		Samuel Sprigg
Israel Denny	White		M	April 13, 1820	Baltimore (Federal)	Piracy		Samuel Sprigg
Peregrine Hutton	White	28	M	July 14, 1820	Baltimore (Federal)	Murder-Robbery	Male, white (mail driver)	Samuel Sprigg
Morris Hull	White	20	M	July 14, 1820	Baltimore (Federal)	Murder-Robbery	Male, white (mail driver)	Samuel Sprigg
Jesse Griffith	White		M	August 16, 1820	Dorchester	Murder	Hanson Tull, white	Samuel Sprigg
Peter	Black		M	March 2, 1821	Frederick	Murder	Mrs. William Baker, white	Samuel Sprigg
Kitty	Black		F	March 2, 1821	Frederick	Murder	Mrs. William Baker, white	Samuel Sprigg
Allen	Black		M	October 5, 1821	St. Mary's	Rape	Araminta Bennett, white	Samuel Sprigg
Jenny	Black		F	October 19, 1821	Somerset	Murder	Sidney Williams, black	Samuel Sprigg
Robert Johnson	White		M	July 23, 1824	Worcester	Murder		Samuel Stevens Jr.
George	Black		M	October 29, 1824	Baltimore	Rape	Female, white	Samuel Stevens Jr.
Henry	Black		M	October 29, 1824	Baltimore	Rape	Female, white	Samuel Stevens Jr.
William Turvey	White		M	August 5, 1825	Charles	Murder	William John Mollahan, white	Samuel Stevens Jr.
Robert	Black		M	June 15, 1827	Worcester	Rape		Joseph Kent
Frederick	Black		M	June 22, 1827	Prince George's	Rape	Eliza Browning, <10, white	Joseph Kent
Jim Truxton	Black		M	April 11, 1828	Talbot	Murder	James Mackey, black	Joseph Kent
George Swearingen	White	29	M	October 2, 1829	Allegany	Murder	Female, white (wife)	Daniel Martin
Shelby Jump	White		M	December 4, 1829	Caroline	Murder	Peter Jump, white (brother)	Daniel Martin
Henny	Black		F	May 13, 1831	Dorchester	Murder	Betsy Thompson Insley, white	Daniel Martin
John Markley	White		M	June 24, 1831	Frederick	Murder-Robbery	Six people, white (Note: Mr. and Mrs. Newey, Mr. Tressler, two children, and an apprentice.)	Daniel Martin
Isaiah Willin	White		M	November 20, 1832	Dorchester	Murder	Female, white (wife)	George Howard
Nelson Wallis	Black		M	December 20, 1833	Baltimore	Rape	Margaret Grace, white	James Thomas
Aurelia Chase	Black		F	December 20, 1833	Baltimore	Poisoning	Elizabeth A. Durkee, white (owner)	James Thomas
Judah	Black	14	F	January 16, 1835	Prince George's	Murder	John Henry Bayne Jr., child, white	James Thomas
William Adams	Black		M	May 29, 1835	Baltimore	Murder	Captain Tilden, white	James Thomas
Dave Thomas	Black		M	January 13, 1837	Talbot	Murder	Capt. Edward Blades, white	Thomas Veazey
John Brown	Black		M	April 1839	Montgomery	Rape	Mary Ann Dare, white	William Grason
William Chrise	White		M	November 24, 1843	Allegany	Murder	Abraham Frey, white	Francis Thomas
Daniel	Black		M	November 24, 1843	Prince George's	Murder	John Smith, white (Note: Also admitted to murdering a fellow slave, Rachel, and denying the murder of another, Tom.)	Francis Thomas
Adam Horn	White	51	M	January 12, 1844	Baltimore	Murder	Malinda Horn, white (wife)	Francis Thomas
George Rustin	Black		M	February 16, 1844	St. Mary's	Murder	Male, white (owner)	Francis Thomas
James Williams	White		M	February 16, 1844	St. Mary's	Murder	Female, white (wife)	Francis Thomas
Henry McCurry	White		M	June 27, 1845	Baltimore	Murder	Paul Roux, white	Thomas Pratt
Joseph Alexander	Black		M	February 26, 1847	Baltimore	Murder	Washington Sheppard, black (Note: Previously served 10 years for raping a white woman.)	Thomas Pratt
Charles	Black	70	M	June 4, 1847	St. Mary's	Rape		Thomas Pratt
Tom	Black		M	June 2, 1848	Anne Arundel	Rape		Philip Francis Thomas
Conrad Vinter	White	22	M	July 21, 1849	Baltimore	Murder	Elizabeth Cooper, white	Philip Francis Thomas
Edward Brown	Black		M	June 28, 1850	Calvert	Murder	John Cracklin, white	Philip Francis Thomas
Thomas McLaughlin	White		M	March 7, 1851	Allegany	Murder	Female, white (wife)	Enoch Louis Lowe
Amos Green	Black		M	August 8, 1851	Howard	Rape	Josephine Pepee, white	Enoch Louis Lowe
Nicholas Murphy	White		M	August 8, 1851	Kent	Murder-Burglary	Three people, white (Note: William Cosden, his wife, and William's 14-year-old sister Amanda.)	Enoch Louis Lowe
William Shelton	White		M	August 8, 1851	Kent	Murder-Burglary	Three people, white	Enoch Louis Lowe
Abraham Taylor	White		M	August 8, 1851	Kent	Murder-Burglary	Three people, white	Enoch Louis Lowe
David Green	Black		M	November 19, 1852	Howard	Rape	Ms. Leek, 14, white	Enoch Louis Lowe
David Johnson	Black		M	January 7, 1853	Anne Arundel	Murder	Mr. Cole, white	Enoch Louis Lowe
White Slocum	Black		M	January 7, 1853	Montgomery	Rape		Enoch Louis Lowe
Thomas Connor	White	19	M	August 5, 1853	Baltimore City	Murder	Capt. William Hutchinson, white	Enoch Louis Lowe
Robert Swift	White		M	April 20, 1855	Cecil	Murder	Mr. Killour, white	Thomas Watkins Ligon
Frederick Miller	White	25	M	January 3, 1856	Allegany	Murder-Robbery	Dr. Hadel and Frederick Graeff, white	Thomas Watkins Ligon
Saul Brown	Black		M	February 29, 1856	Queen Anne's	Murder	Mr. Porter, white	Thomas Watkins Ligon
Jim Mills	Black		M	August 15, 1856	Worcester	Rape		Thomas Watkins Ligon
Littleton Stevens	Black		M	August 15, 1856	Worcester	Rape		Thomas Watkins Ligon
John Gowings	Black		M	January 15, 1858	Somerset	Murder	Mrs. Stewart, elderly, white	Thomas Holliday Hicks
Phillip Hawkins	Black		M	January 29, 1858	Frederick	Murder	James Diggs, black	Thomas Holliday Hicks
Alfred Dashiell	Black		M	July 2, 1858	Somerset	Murder	Mathias Dorman, white	Thomas Holliday Hicks
Marion Crop	White	23	M	April 8, 1859	Baltimore City	Murder	Mr. Rigdon, white (police officer)	Thomas Holliday Hicks
Peter Corrie	White	26	M	April 8, 1859	Baltimore City	Murder	Mr. Rigdon, white (police officer)	Thomas Holliday Hicks
Henry Gambrill	White	25	M	April 8, 1859	Baltimore City	Murder	Mr. Benton, white (police officer)	Thomas Holliday Hicks
John Cyphus	Black	34	M	April 8, 1859	Baltimore City	Murder	William King, white	Thomas Holliday Hicks
Rebecca McCormick	Black		F	July 24, 1859	Carroll	Murder	Francis Miles, black	Thomas Holliday Hicks
Four unknowns	Black		M	November 1860	Prince George's	Murder-Robbery	Col. W. Sylvester, white	Thomas Holliday Hicks
Mary Naylor	Black		F	October 4, 1861	Anne Arundel	Murder	Robert Carr, white (owner)	Thomas Holliday Hicks
Perry Kennard	Black	42	M	November 22, 1861	Baltimore	Rape	Mrs. Cromie, white	Thomas Holliday Hicks
John Lanahan	White		M	December 23, 1861	Frederick (Military)	Murder		Thomas Holliday Hicks
Joseph Kuhns	White		M	March 7, 1862	Baltimore City (Military)	Murder	David E. Whitson, white	Augustus Bradford
Bill Ferguson	Black		M	September 5, 1862	Calvert	Murder	Ned Thomas, black	Augustus Bradford
Frederick Smith	White		M	April 10, 1863	Washington	Murder	Agnes Tracy, white	Augustus Bradford
William Richardson	White		M	July 5, 1863	Frederick (Military)	Espionage		Augustus Bradford
Ned Davis	Black		M	July 17, 1863	Somerset	Rape		Augustus Bradford
Bob Jones	Black		M	July 17, 1863	Somerset	Rape		Augustus Bradford
Morris	Black		M	July 17, 1863	Somerset	Rape		Augustus Bradford
George Coard	Black	25	M	August 21, 1863	Worcester	Rape	Female, white	Augustus Bradford
Henry Burnham	White		M	May 9, 1864	St. Mary's (Military)	Desertion		Augustus Bradford
Andrew Laypole	White		M	May 23, 1864	Baltimore City (Military)	Espionage		Augustus Bradford
Francis Gillespie	White		M	July 11, 1864	Allegany (Military)	Murder		Augustus Bradford
Granville Smeltzer	White	20	M	July 22, 1864	Frederick	Murder-Burglary	Mrs. David Nusbaum and her son, white	Augustus Bradford
George McDonald	White		M	September 27, 1864	Baltimore City (Military)	Desertion		Augustus Bradford
John Provost	White		M	November 10, 1864	Allegany (Military)	Murder		Augustus Bradford
Thomas Davis	Black	19	M	November 2, 1866	Prince George's	Murder-Burglary	William Lyles, 57, white	Thomas Swann
William James	Black	26	M	November 2, 1866	Prince George's	Murder-Burglary	William Lyles, 57, white	Thomas Swann
Henry Luckett	Black	23	M	November 2, 1866	Prince George's	Murder-Burglary	William Lyles, 57, white	Thomas Swann
William Plater	Black	28	M	November 2, 1866	Prince George's	Murder-Burglary	William Lyles, 57, white	Thomas Swann
Lucy Purnell	Black		F	February 28, 1868	Worcester	Murder	Hanson Robbins, black	Thomas Swann
George Bailey	Black	26	M	March 5, 1869	Somerset	Murder	Benjamin F. Johnson and Henry Cannon, 25 and 21, white	Oden Bowie
Frank Rounds	Black	27	M	March 5, 1869	Somerset	Murder	Benjamin F. Johnson and Henry Cannon, 25 and 21, white	Oden Bowie
William Wells	Black	19	M	March 5, 1869	Somerset	Murder	Benjamin F. Johnson and Henry Cannon, 25 and 21, white	Oden Bowie
William Wilson	Black	19	M	March 5, 1869	Somerset	Murder	Benjamin F. Johnson and Henry Cannon, 25 and 21, white	Oden Bowie
George Turner	Black	20	M	May 29, 1869	Frederick	Murder-Robbery	Unidentified male, white	Oden Bowie
Nimrod Richards	Black	24	M	August 12, 1870	Prince George's	Murder	Col. William Lyles, 57, white	Oden Bowie
John Rice	Black	19	M	September 16, 1870	Calvert	Rape	Sarah Crandall, 63, white	Oden Bowie
John Martin	Black	21	M	February 10, 1871	Frederick	Rape	Mary Butcher, 82, white	Oden Bowie
John Howard	White	28	M	February 10, 1871	Allegany	Murder-Robbery	Henry Miller, white	Oden Bowie
Mary Willis	Black	17	F	February 10, 1871	Prince George's	Murder	Albert H. Reed, 9 months, white	Oden Bowie
Fred Lawrence	Black	41	M	July 14, 1871	Talbot	Murder	Emeline Handy, 29, black (common-law wife)	Oden Bowie
William Pritchard	Black	17	M	September 29, 1871	Baltimore (Note: Trial held in Baltimore City.)	Rape	Mary Sendel, 19, white	Oden Bowie
William Craig	Black	73	M	January 10, 1873	Allegany	Rape	Lottie Dayton, 73, white	William Pinkney Whyte
Thomas Jackson	Black	49	M	July 11, 1873	St. Mary's	Murder-Robbery	James Scofield, 48, white	William Pinkney Whyte
Albert Sanders	Black	23	M	July 11, 1873	Calvert	Murder-Robbery	Eugene Archie Burdell, white	William Pinkney Whyte
Thomas Hollohan	White	29	M	August 1, 1873	Baltimore City	Murder-Robbery	Mary Ann Lampley, 71, white (Nicholson's grandmother-in-law)	William Pinkney Whyte
Joshua Nicholson	White	25	M	August 1, 1873	Baltimore City	Murder-Robbery	Mary Ann Lampley, 71, white (Nicholson's grandmother-in-law)	William Pinkney Whyte
James West	Black	22	M	August 23, 1873	Baltimore City	Murder	Annie Gibson, 23, black (girlfriend)	William Pinkney Whyte
Levan Palmer	Black	29	M	August 23, 1873	Baltimore	Rape	Mary Sendel, 19, white	William Pinkney Whyte
Joseph Wheeling Davis	White	22	M	February 6, 1874	Carroll	Murder-Robbery	Abraham L. Lynn, 27, white	William Pinkney Whyte
William McCotter	White	23	M	February 6, 1874	Dorchester	Murder	Robert Insley, 52, white (father-in-law)	William Pinkney Whyte
Ernest Smith	Black	17	M	August 7, 1874	Talbot	Murder	Kate E. Bartlett, 17, white	James Black Groome
George Wheeler	Black	23	M	March 12, 1875	Talbot	Murder	Margaret B. Wittman, 72, white	James Black Groome
Joshua Griffin	Black	22	M	March 12, 1875	Harford	Murder-Robbery	Susan R. Taylor, 47, white (adoptive mother)	James Black Groome
Jenkins Howell	Black	25	M	August 12, 1876	Worcester	Rape	Sally Mary Hadder, 20, white (Note: Serial rapist, also raped Margaret Purnell (50, black) within two hours of attacking Hadder. Hadder was also pregnant at time of crime. Howell had previously served time for an attempted rape.)	John Lee Carroll
Charles Simpson	Black	35	M	February 9, 1877	Charles	Murder-Burglary	John W. Everett, 28, white	John Lee Carroll
Martin Henry	Black	35	M	February 9, 1877	Charles	Murder-Burglary	John W. Everett, 28, white	John Lee Carroll
James Hawkins	Black	20	M	November 23, 1877	Baltimore	Rape	Ida Schaeffer, 13, white	John Lee Carroll
Henry Norfolk	White	25	M	December 21, 1877	Anne Arundel	Murder	Sally Johnson Norfolk, 24, white (wife)	John Lee Carroll
Edward Costley	Black	19	M	June 21, 1878	Frederick	Murder-Robbery	Solomon Costley, 70, black (cousin)	John Lee Carroll
Hiram Fooks	Black	47	M	July 11, 1878	Somerset	Murder	Jack Tyler, 18, black	John Lee Carroll
Medford Walters	Black	18	M	December 5, 1879	Cecil	Murder	Jenkins Whaley, 20, black	John Lee Carroll
John Gothard	Black	53	M	April 29, 1881	Baltimore	Murder	Joseph Woods, 47, white	William Thomas Hamilton
Felix Munschor	White	32	M	November 11, 1881	Frederick	Murder-Robbery	James L. Wetzel, 45, white	William Thomas Hamilton
Arthur Preston	Black	21	M	January 19, 1883	Harford	Murder	Mary Dorsey, 25, black (girlfriend)	William Thomas Hamilton
George Lake	Black	34	M	June 29, 1883	Dorchester	Rape	Clara Simmons, 41, white	William Thomas Hamilton
John Smith	Black	40	M	November 16, 1883	Garrett	Murder	Josiah Harden, 54, white (Note: Also assaulted his wife, Harriet.)	William Thomas Hamilton
Frederick Cephas	Black	35	M	August 1, 1884	Dorchester	Murder-Robbery	Celia Bush Murphy, 68, white	Robert Milligan McLane
Charles Williams	Black	21	M	January 8, 1886	Dorchester	Rape	Eliza J. Keene, 35, white	Henry Lloyd
Jim Stevens	Black	44	M	February 25, 1887	Somerset	Rape	Mary Trehearn, 83, white	Henry Lloyd
John Ross	Black	27	M	September 9, 1887	Baltimore City	Murder	Emily Brown, 60, white	Henry Lloyd
John Biscoe	Black	21	M	April 27, 1888	St. Mary's	Murder-Robbery	Capt. Robert R. Dixon, 64, white	Elihu Emory Jackson
Melvin Garlitz	White	25	M	August 30, 1889	Allegany	Murder	Leah White Garlitz, 21, white (wife)	Elihu Emory Jackson
Ernest Forbes	Black	19	M	April 3, 1891	Anne Arundel (Note: Trial held in Baltimore City.)	Rape	Bertha Phipps, 16, white	Elihu Emory Jackson
William Blaney	White	25	M	June 12, 1891	Baltimore City	Murder-Robbery	Sarah and Caroline Blaney, 80 and 56, white (grandmother and aunt)	Elihu Emory Jackson
Thomas Thompson	Black	22	M	January 29, 1892	Kent	Murder	William Adams, 27, black	Frank Brown
Buck Brooks	Black	26	M	January 13, 1893	Kent	Murder	James Heighe Hill, 30, white	Frank Brown
Moses Brown	Black	31	M	January 13, 1893	Kent	Murder	James Heighe Hill, 30, white	Frank Brown
Frisbie Comegys	Black	17	M	January 13, 1893	Kent	Murder	James Heighe Hill, 30, white	Frank Brown
Fletcher Williams	Black	23	M	January 13, 1893	Kent	Murder	James Heighe Hill, 30, white	Frank Brown
Alfred Stout	Black	25	M	January 27, 1893	Cecil	Murder-Burglary	George Ditmore, 73, white	Frank Brown
William Bond	Black	25	M	April 14, 1893	Montgomery	Murder-Rape	Margaret Cephas, 30, black	Frank Brown
William Pinkney	Black	22	M	June 30, 1893	Prince George's	Murder-Robbery	Francis M. Bowie, 43, white	Frank Brown
Daniel Barber	Black	28	M	June 30, 1893	Prince George's	Murder-Robbery	Francis M. Bowie, 43, white	Frank Brown
Arthur Courtney	Black	24	M	December 13, 1893	Somerset	Murder-Robbery	Capt. Frank Cooper, white	Frank Brown
Henry Taylor	Black	19	M	December 13, 1893	Somerset	Murder-Robbery	Capt. Frank Cooper, white	Frank Brown
William Leonard	White	49	M	February 16, 1894	Frederick (Note: Trial held in Montgomery County.)	Murder	Jesse T. Armstrong, 28, white	Frank Brown
James Allen	Black	21	M	July 6, 1894	Prince George's	Rape	Cora Simpson, 11, white	Frank Brown
William Jackson	Black	62	M	July 6, 1894	Queen Anne's	Murder	George J. Leager, 43, white	Frank Brown
Horace Cooper	Black	32	M	June 21, 1895	Cecil	Murder	Margaret Pitt, 29, black (girlfriend)	Frank Brown
James Harry Truss	White	37	M	June 26, 1896	Cecil	Murder-Robbery	Thomas Camp, 50, white	Lloyd Lowndes Jr.
James Smith	Black	29	M	December 18, 1896	Prince George's	Murder-Rape	Marguerite Alexander Drown, 24, white	Lloyd Lowndes Jr.
George Matthews	White	31	M	March 12, 1897	Charles	Murder	James J. Irwin, 30, white	Lloyd Lowndes Jr.
Peter Monahan	White	74	M	August 13, 1897	Baltimore City	Murder	Bridget Monahan, 55, white (wife)	Lloyd Lowndes Jr.
Sommerfield Dennis	Black	16	M	August 12, 1898	Worcester	Murder	America Holland, 67, black (stepfather)	Lloyd Lowndes Jr.
Lewis Wesley Johnson	Black	38	M	November 11, 1898	Baltimore	Rape-Robbery	Ianthe Ensor Stevenson, 40, white	Lloyd Lowndes Jr.
Joseph Wright	Black	21	M	March 24, 1899	Kent (Note: Sentenced at second trial in Talbot County.)	Murder	William Newcomb, 60, black	Lloyd Lowndes Jr.
John Berry	Black	16	M	June 16, 1899	Prince George's	Murder-Robbery	Mary Amanda Clarke, 52, white	Lloyd Lowndes Jr.
Cornelius Gardner	Black	23	M	July 28, 1899	Baltimore City	Rape	Anne Bailey, 15, black	Lloyd Lowndes Jr.
Charles James	Black	21	M	July 28, 1899	Baltimore City	Rape	Anne Bailey, 15, black	Lloyd Lowndes Jr.
John Myers	Black	19	M	July 28, 1899	Baltimore City	Rape	Anne Bailey, 15, black	Lloyd Lowndes Jr.
Joseph Bryan	Black	32	M	July 28, 1899	Baltimore City	Murder	Mary Pack, 35, black (girlfriend)	Lloyd Lowndes Jr.
Armistead Taylor	Black	27	M	August 18, 1899	Montgomery (Note: Taylor's trial was moved to Frederick County.)	Murder-Burglary	Louis and Dora Rosenstein, 26 and 24, white (Note: Dora was pregnant when murdered. Taylor also shot and killed police sergeant Fritz Passau in Washington, D.C. while being arrested, but no murder charges were pursued in the District of Columbia as the officers lacked a warrant.)	Lloyd Lowndes Jr.
John Brown	Black	43	M	August 18, 1899	Montgomery	Murder-Burglary	Louis and Dora Rosenstein, 26 and 24, white	Lloyd Lowndes Jr.
Samuel Johnson	Black	22	M	December 8, 1899	Washington	Rape	Emma Kerfoot, 12, white	Lloyd Lowndes Jr.

== 1900–1961 ==
=== 1900–1923 ===
Name	Race	Age	Sex	Date of execution	County or City	Crime	Victim(s)	Governor
Robert Wyatt	White	21	M	July 27, 1900	Anne Arundel (Note: Trial held in Howard County.)	Murder-Robbery	Oliver M. Caulk, 46, white (Note: Also murdered an unidentified black man during the same crime.)	John Walter Smith
Amos Smith	Black	25	M	August 3, 1900	Baltimore City	Murder	Sadie James, 24, black (girlfriend)	John Walter Smith
William Black	Black	24	M	August 31, 1900	Harford	Rape	Jessie Bradford, 15, white	John Walter Smith
Charles Overs	Black	28	M	April 19, 1901	Frederick	Murder	Charles Frank Donaldson, 19, white	John Walter Smith
Wiley Kirk	Black	18	M	May 31, 1901	Baltimore	Rape	Barbara E. Green, 44, white	John Walter Smith
John Butler	Black	41	M	August 23, 1901	Baltimore City	Murder	Lavinia Butler, 34, black (wife)	John Walter Smith
Henry Boyd	Black	24	M	January 17, 1902	Prince George's	Murder	Martha Oden, 18, black (girlfriend)	John Walter Smith
Frank Jones	Black	22	M	June 20, 1902	Howard	Murder-Robbery	Israel Radetsky, 36, white (Note: Johnson had previously served 18 years in Kentucky for the murder of another inmate.)	John Walter Smith
John Johnson	Black	52	M	June 20, 1902	Howard	Murder-Robbery	Israel Radetsky, 36, white	John Walter Smith
Asbury Dixon	Black	50	M	August 29, 1902	Worcester	Murder	Delia Dixon, 27, black (common-law wife)	John Walter Smith
John Devine	Black	29	M	September 19, 1902	Baltimore City	Murder	Charles J. Donohue, 27, white (patrolman)	John Walter Smith
Howard Matthews	Black	34	M	May 20, 1904	Howard	Murder-Robbery	Hugh McAvoy, 63, white	Edwin Warfield
James Cooper	Black	29	M	July 29, 1904	Baltimore City	Murder	Edward Powell, 45, black	Edwin Warfield
Andrew Leonard	White	34	M	October 14, 1904	Baltimore City	Murder	Ann Collins Leonard, 39, white (wife)	Edwin Warfield
Edward Cassidy	Black	36	M	December 23, 1904	Baltimore	Rape-Burglary	Emma Florijnek, 21, white	Edwin Warfield
Julius Cooper	Black	36	M	January 27, 1905	Anne Arundel	Murder	George Harris, 29, black	Edwin Warfield
William Henry Jones	Black	30	M	February 17, 1905	Baltimore City	Murder-Burglary	James Emory Cunningham, 59, white	Edwin Warfield
Henry Handy	Black	37	M	July 7, 1905	Wicomico	Murder	Cecilia Handy, 22, black (wife)	Edwin Warfield
John Burch	Black	24	M	July 7, 1905	Baltimore City	Murder	Lulu Morsell, 19, black (girlfriend)	Edwin Warfield
William Leazer	Black	35	M	July 21, 1905	Anne Arundel	Murder	John George McNamara, 45, white (patrolman)	Edwin Warfield
John Simpers	White	22	M	October 20, 1905	Cecil	Murder-Robbery	Albert Constable, 64, white	Edwin Warfield
Isaac Winder	Black	27	M	March 30, 1906	Baltimore	Murder-Robbery	Frederick Thomas Rinehart, 63, white	Edwin Warfield
Joseph Bradley	Black	40	M	July 6, 1906	Howard	Murder	John Redwine, 27, black	Edwin Warfield
Harold Ernest Lyles	Black	25	M	July 13, 1906	Baltimore	Murder	Harriet Ardenia Derricks, 20, black (love interest)	Edwin Warfield
William Lee	Black	17	M	July 26, 1906	Somerset (Note: Trial held in Baltimore City.)	Rape	Frances Powell and Lela Barnes, 18 and 33, white	Edwin Warfield
John Henry	Black	27	M	July 26, 1906	Worcester	Rape	Mrs. Frederick J. Selby, 43, white	Edwin Warfield
Frisbie Gibbs	Black	40	M	May 10, 1907	Baltimore City	Murder	Ida Cuff, 43, black (common-law wife)	Edwin Warfield
Edward Wilson	Black	29	M	February 28, 1908	Baltimore City	Murder	Martha Hawkins Wilson, 22, black (wife)	Austin Lane Crothers
Andrew Taylor	Black	27	M	August 9, 1912	Anne Arundel	Murder	Fanny May Clifton, 41, black (girlfriend)	Phillips Lee Goldsborough
Wesley Mills	Black	42	M	December 6, 1912	Somerset (Note: Trial held in Baltimore City.)	Rape	Margaret E. Phillips, 15, white	Phillips Lee Goldsborough
Philip Gibson	Black	31	M	January 3, 1913	Baltimore City	Murder	John Johnson, 31, black	Phillips Lee Goldsborough
James Jacobs	Black	27	M	January 10, 1913	Anne Arundel	Murder	John Brooks, 28, black	Phillips Lee Goldsborough
Wish Shepard	Black	18	M	August 27, 1915	Caroline	Rape	Mildred Clark, 15, white	Phillips Lee Goldsborough
Benjamin E. Davis	White	37	M	November 12, 1915	Baltimore	Murder	Mary Ann Davis, 33, white (wife)	Phillips Lee Goldsborough
Frank Grano	White	53	M	November 26, 1915	Worcester	Murder	Three people, white (Note: Levin P. and Della S. Robinson (41 and 31, white) and Alonzo M. Redden (37, white). Fugitive from Philadelphia for the murder of his wife Caroline Stumpo (51, white) in 1913.)	Phillips Lee Goldsborough
Arnold Martin	Black	27	M	January 7, 1916	Anne Arundel	Murder	John E. Miller, 33, white (special police officer)	Phillips Lee Goldsborough
Solomon Sudler	Black	17	M	April 14, 1916	Carroll	Murder-Robbery	William F. Brown, 26, white	Emerson Harrington
Marion Deems	White	32	M	May 26, 1916	Baltimore	Murder-Rape-Robbery	Laura M. Schaefer, 29, white	Emerson Harrington
John Brown	Mixed (Note: "Half Indian, half negro".)	28	M	June 30, 1916	Washington	Murder-Robbery	Susan A. Dixon, 74, white (Note: Also confessed to the robbery and murder of Frank Metz.)	Emerson Harrington
George A. Myers	Black	30	M	August 4, 1916	Howard	Murder	Carrie Dorsey, 13, black (love interest)	Emerson Harrington
Archie Isaacs	Black	30	M	July 12, 1918	Anne Arundel	Murder-Rape-Robbery	Dora Ebert, 27, white	Emerson Harrington
John Henry Evans	Black	28	M	October 4, 1918	Anne Arundel	Rape	Mary Hannah Henson, 13, black	Emerson Harrington
John Snowden	Black	25	M	February 28, 1919	Anne Arundel	Murder-Burglary (Note: Posthumously pardoned in 2001 due to flimsy evidence and racial bias.)	Lottie May Haislup Brandon, 23, white	Emerson Harrington
George Cummings	Black	35	M	December 5, 1919	Prince George's	Murder-Burglary	George Peters, 52, white (Note: Also seriously wounded and raped his daughter, Catherine.)	Emerson Harrington
Isaiah Fountain	Black	28	M	July 23, 1920	Talbot (Note: Trial held in Baltimore County.)	Rape	Bertha Simpson, 14, white	Albert Ritchie
George Terry	Black	29	M	January 28, 1921	Baltimore City	Rape-Burglary	Sadie Sibley, 52, white	Albert Ritchie
Felix Bell	Black	28	M	February 25, 1921	Baltimore City	Murder-Robbery	Russell Lee, 42, black	Albert Ritchie
Charles Robinson	Black	16	M	February 25, 1921	Frederick	Murder-Rape	Mary Edith Hightman, 27, white	Albert Ritchie
Charles Lewis	Black	31	M	March 18, 1921	Baltimore City	Murder-Robbery	Evert K. Gerritsen, 41, white	Albert Ritchie
William Davis	Black	34	M	March 18, 1921	Baltimore City	Murder-Robbery	Evert K. Gerritsen, 41, white	Albert Ritchie
Robert Robinson	Black	21	M	April 1, 1921	Anne Arundel (Note: Trial held in Baltimore City.)	Murder-Robbery	James Elder Tydings, 50, white	Albert Ritchie
Guy Thompson	White	41	M	April 15, 1921	Montgomery	Murder	Three people, white (Note: James Bolton (35), Evelyn Shipley (2), and Harold Shipley (1).)	Albert Ritchie
Henry Brown	Black	19	M	September 1, 1921	Baltimore City (Federal) (Note: Crime committed at the U.S. Naval Academy in Annapolis.)	Murder-Robbery	Harriet A. Kavanaugh, 35, white	Albert Ritchie
John Davis	Black	22	M	February 17, 1922	Baltimore City	Murder	Bessie Simms (girlfriend) and Lottie Luckey, 20 and 63, black	Albert Ritchie
Samuel Smith	Black	26	M	February 24, 1922	Baltimore	Attempted rape-Kidnap	Marita Davis Lyons, 21, white	Albert Ritchie
William Stultz	White	45	M	November 10, 1922	Frederick	Murder	John H. Adams, 47, white (police officer)	Albert Ritchie
Bishop Hawkins	Black	43	M	April 6, 1923	Baltimore City	Murder	Ethel Starling, black (girlfriend)	Albert Ritchie
John Butler	Black	27	M	May 11, 1923	St. Mary's	Rape	Madeline Kundahl, 60, white	Albert Ritchie

=== 1923–1961 ===
On January 1, 1923, a new law went into effect which required all executions to be moved to a centralized gallows in the Maryland Penitentiary. On March 23, 1955, the Maryland Senate voted 16–9 to replace hanging with gas asphyxiation. The new $26,000 gas chamber arrived in Baltimore on February 28, 1956, and was subsequently installed in the penitentiary that July after the change was made official in June.

Name	Race	Age	Sex	Date of execution	County or City	Crime	Victim(s)	Governor
George Shelton	Black	21	M	June 8, 1923	Somerset	Rape	Thelma Hughlett, 14, white	Albert Ritchie
Carroll Gibson	Black	18	M	February 13, 1925	Talbot	Rape	Clara E. Baker, 41, white	Albert Ritchie
Isaac Benson	Black	37	M	July 23, 1926	Baltimore City	Murder	Carrie Braxton and Haywood Price, 37 and 34, black	Albert Ritchie
Richard Whittemore	White	27	M	August 13, 1926	Baltimore City	Murder	Robert H. Holtman, 61, white (prison guard) (Note: Murdered during an escape from the Maryland Penitentiary. Also previously murdered Charles W. Clifford and Louis M. Yarington (41 and 53, white) during a 1925 robbery in Buffalo, New York.)	Albert Ritchie
William Henry Ross	Black	23	M	September 9, 1927	Washington	Murder-Attempted rape	Lottie L. McElfresh, 38, white	Albert Ritchie
Arthur Swann	Black	20	M	September 9, 1927	Frederick	Murder-Robbery	Edward J. Carpenter, 35, white	Albert Ritchie
Ottie Simmons	Black	19	M	September 9, 1927	Frederick	Murder-Robbery	Edward J. Carpenter, 35, white	Albert Ritchie
Alfred Simms	Black	19	M	November 11, 1927	Prince George's	Attempted rape	Alberta Rice, 20, white (Note: Also attacked her boyfriend, John W. Buckler (26, white).)	Albert Ritchie
Benjamin F. Spragins	White	28	M	August 3, 1928	Baltimore (Note: Change of venue.)	Murder	Alfred H. Walker, 66, white (prison clerk) (Note: Murdered during an escape attempt from the Maryland Penitentiary. Carey was serving a life sentence for the robbery and murder of William B. Norris (42, white) in Baltimore in 1922.)	Albert Ritchie
Charles P. Carey	White	28	M	August 3, 1928	Baltimore City	Murder	Alfred H. Walker, 66, white (prison clerk)	Albert Ritchie
Hopkins Watkins	Black	27	M	November 16, 1928	Baltimore	Murder	John King, black	Albert Ritchie
John Orestus Marsh	White	51	M	August 9, 1929	Carroll	Murder	Beulah L. Marsh, 29, white (wife)	Albert Ritchie
John Jackson	Black	55	M	January 31, 1930	Baltimore City	Murder	Mattie Tarleton and Mary Wright, 29 and 50, black	Albert Ritchie
Lorenzo Price	Black	32	M	June 21, 1931	Baltimore City	Murder	Reuben Hayman, 24, white (Note: Also sexually assaulted Dorothy M. Burgess (24, white) during the crime, a carjacking.)	Albert Ritchie
Thomas Blackson	Black	42	M	January 15, 1932	Worcester	Murder	Randolph Taylor, 25, black	Albert Ritchie
Walter F. Wright	Black	28	M	April 8, 1932	Baltimore City	Murder	William Alfred Bell, 52, white (patrolman)	Albert Ritchie
Euel Lee	Black	60	M	October 27, 1933	Baltimore (Note: Change of venue from Worcester County.)	Murder	William Green Davis, 55, white (Note: Also murdered his wife Eva Davis (38) and their daughters Elizabeth (15) and Mary Lee (13). Also previously the main suspect in the murders of Evan and Thomas Davis (52 and 56, white) during a burglary in Mercer County, Pennsylvania.)	Albert Ritchie
Page Jupiter	Black	46	M	February 2, 1934	Charles	Murder-Rape	Evelyn Reifschneider, 47, white	Albert Ritchie
James A. Cross	Black	25	M	April 19, 1935	Prince George's	Murder-Robbery	John T. Geary Jr., 43, white	Harry Nice
Gordon Dent	Black	30	M	April 19, 1935	Prince George's	Murder-Robbery	John T. Geary Jr., 43, white	Harry Nice
James Poindexter	Black	27	M	June 28, 1935	Montgomery	Rape	Female, 16, white	Harry Nice
William Harold	Black	45	M	June 28, 1935	Montgomery	Rape	Female, 16, white	Harry Nice
Willie Williams	Black	25	M	June 12, 1936	Baltimore City	Murder-Robbery	Samuel and Bessie Blacher, 75 and 64, white	Harry Nice
Augusto Perez	Hispanic	22	M	June 12, 1936	Baltimore City	Rape	Constance Kosakowski, 10, white	Harry Nice
James Irvin Howard	Black	20	M	July 9, 1937	Anne Arundel	Murder-Robbery	Marie M. Gunter, 55, white	Harry Nice
Richard Hammond	Black	31	M	August 12, 1938	Baltimore City	Murder-Burglary	Edith Milman, 46, white	Harry Nice
James Albert Turner	Black	25	M	August 26, 1938	Montgomery	Rape	Etta May Coleman, 13, white	Harry Nice
Fred L. Brown	White	44	M	March 19, 1939	Dorchester	Murder	Elizabeth Arvey Brown, 17, white (wife) (Note: Pregnant with their child when murdered.)	Herbert O'Conor
Alvin Kenton	White	23	M	March 15, 1940	Talbot (Note: Change of venue from Queen Anne's County.)	Rape-Burglary	Alice Aikens, 82, white	Herbert O'Conor
Thomas C. Sanchez	Hispanic	40	M	March 15, 1940	Talbot	Rape-Burglary	Alice Aikens, 82, white	Herbert O'Conor
Otis Harrell	Black	23	M	May 10, 1940	Baltimore City	Murder	Wallace L. Smith, 74, black	Herbert O'Conor
William T. Sorrell	Black	28	M	May 10, 1940	Baltimore City	Murder	Wallace L. Smith, 74, black	Herbert O'Conor
Alexander Williams	Black	33	M	June 28, 1940	Anne Arundel	Rape-Kidnap	Adele Stockett, 22, white	Herbert O'Conor
Arthur H. Collick	Black	27	M	September 13, 1940	Baltimore (Note: Change of venue from Worcester County.)	Murder-Burglary	Harvey Pilchard, 61, white	Herbert O'Conor
Wilson Knott	White	33	M	January 10, 1941	Anne Arundel	Rape	Female, 19, white (Note: Serial rapist, attacked several other women. Also suspected in the previous murder of Frank A. Scheihing (25, white) and the attempted rape of Anna Peterson (24, white) in Baltimore City, and also of murdering fellow convict Frank Allers (white) in 1932.)	Herbert O'Conor
French Lee White	Black	23	M	June 27, 1941	Montgomery	Rape	Female, 26, white	Herbert O'Conor
James Lee Miller	White	29	M	September 26, 1941	Allegany (Note: Change of venue from Washington County.)	Murder-Robbery	Raleigh Poffenberger, 76, white	Herbert O'Conor
Earl Loveless	White	22	M	September 26, 1941	Allegany	Murder-Robbery	Raleigh Poffenberger, 76, white	Herbert O'Conor
James Baker	Black	38	M	December 19, 1941	Dorchester (Note: Change of venue from Worcester County.)	Murder	Larry Donohue, 34, black	Herbert O'Conor
Wilbur Pritchett	Black	37	M	May 8, 1942	Dorchester	Attempted rape-Burglary	Jessie R. Dail, 62, white	Herbert O'Conor
Frank Haywood	Black	32	M	June 5, 1942	Prince George's	Rape-Kidnap	Female, 18, white	Herbert O'Conor
Andrew Henry	Black	54	M	July 10, 1942	Dorchester	Murder	Francis P. Ross, 36, black	Herbert O'Conor
Edward Woffard	Black	27	M	July 24, 1942	Baltimore City	Murder-Robbery	Vincent di Pietro, 44, white	Herbert O'Conor
Charles J. Benjamin	Black	23	M	July 24, 1942	Baltimore City	Murder-Robbery	Vincent di Pietro, 44, white	Herbert O'Conor
James Gilliam	Black	39	M	January 15, 1943	Worcester	Murder	David Lewis, 40, black	Herbert O'Conor
James Ford	Black	32	M	March 12, 1943	Baltimore City	Rape	Mary Stewart, 42, white	Herbert O'Conor
Freeman Holton	Black	21	M	June 4, 1943	Baltimore City	Murder-Robbery	Louis Pertnoy, 37, white	Herbert O'Conor
Frank Williams	Black	23	M	June 4, 1943	Baltimore City	Murder-Robbery	Louis Pertnoy, 37, white	Herbert O'Conor
John Lampkin	Black	19	M	August 13, 1943	Baltimore City	Rape-Kidnap	Mrs. Sanford Norris, white	Herbert O'Conor
William Charles Holsey	Black	33	M	February 25, 1944	Carroll	Murder-Burglary	Charles L. Meister, 55, white	Herbert O'Conor
Martin Smith	Black	20	M	March 31, 1944	Baltimore City	Rape-Burglary	Two females, white (Note: Serial rapist, assaulted three total white women.)	Herbert O'Conor
John Hinton	Black	25	M	June 16, 1944	Dorchester (Note: Change of venue from Somerset County.)	Attempted rape	Geraldine Griffin, 15, white	Herbert O'Conor
Calvin William Watkins	Black	24	M	November 17, 1944	Baltimore City	Murder-Robbery	Joseph J. Stewart, 57, white	Herbert O'Conor
Patrick Murphy	White	40	M	July 20, 1945	Prince George's	Rape	Margaret Laignel, 25, white (Note: Serial rapist, also charged with the rape of another 18-year-old woman in the same county. Also given a suspended sentence for carnal knowledge in Dade County, Florida in March 1939 and had several charges of carnal abuse and unlawful intercourse under different aliases.)	Herbert O'Conor
Luther McClam	Black	28	M	August 17, 1945	Baltimore City	Murder	Three people, black (Note: Ray Moore (22), Thomas Tate (33), and Fred Moore (44).)	Herbert O'Conor
Donald Brooks	White	31	M	November 30, 1945	Baltimore City	Murder-Burglary	Mary M. Finn, 63, white	Herbert O'Conor
John Henry Fields	Black	38	M	December 28, 1945	Worcester	Murder	Gordon G. Barnes, 39, white (deputy game warden)	Herbert O'Conor
William Tasker	Black	21	M	January 18, 1946	Anne Arundel	Murder	Richard Johnson, 29, black	Herbert O'Conor
Lloyd Walker	Black	22	M	August 9, 1946	Baltimore City	Attempted rape-Robbery	Female, 19, white	Herbert O'Conor
William Demby	Black	22	M	October 4, 1946	Baltimore City (Note: Change of venue from Harford County.)	Rape-Kidnap	Edna E. Strickland, 28, white	Herbert O'Conor
Roy Nathan Peters	Black	22	M	October 4, 1946	Baltimore City	Rape-Kidnap	Edna E. Strickland, 28, white	Herbert O'Conor
Jack Lester Barnes	Black	25	M	December 13, 1946	Prince George's	Rape	Female, 53, white	Herbert O'Conor
Charles Lee Carmen	Black	19	M	January 17, 1947	Harford (Note: Change of venue from Cecil County.)	Rape	Dottie Jean Streeter, 26, white	William Preston Lane Jr.
William Copper	Black	20	M	June 27, 1947	Harford (Note: Change of venue from Talbot County.)	Rape	Female, 25, white	William Preston Lane Jr.
Ross Abbott	White	24	M	August 1, 1947	Dorchester	Murder	Pansy Twigg, 19, white (girlfriend)	William Preston Lane Jr.
Weldon Jones Jr.	Black	18	M	August 1, 1947	Wicomico	Murder-Robbery	Raynor Graham, 38, white (Note: Also shot an injured a 16-year-old white boy while attempting to steal his skiff and attempted to rape a 46-year-old white storekeeper and a 16-year-old white girl. His 15-year-old brother Holbrook was present during all crimes and given a life sentence for Graham's murder.)	William Preston Lane Jr.
Roy Lee Lathco	White	39	M	April 30, 1948	Baltimore	Rape	Female, 11, white (Note: Previously convicted of attempted rape in Raleigh, North Carolina.)	William Preston Lane Jr.
Henry Jackson	Black	32	M	April 30, 1948	Worcester	Murder	Otha Mason and Emma Jackson, 31 (Mason), black	William Preston Lane Jr.
Ollie Smith Jr.	Black	22	M	April 30, 1948	Dorchester	Rape	Florence May Henry, 22, white	William Preston Lane Jr.
Howard A. Fram	White	31	M	July 8, 1949	Baltimore City	Murder-Robbery	George Lehr, 77, white	William Preston Lane Jr.
Eugene H. James	Black	31	M	August 12, 1949	Baltimore City	Murder-Rape	Marsha Brill, 11, white (Note: Serial rapist, raped and robbed a white woman in Baltimore and raped and murdered 11-year-old Carol Bardwell (white) in Washington, D.C.)	William Preston Lane Jr.
John Knowles	Black	26	M	August 12, 1949	Baltimore City	Murder	Ruby Davis, 21, black (girlfriend)	William Preston Lane Jr.
Lott Glover	Black	31	M	August 25, 1953	Prince George's	Murder-Robbery	James Alfred Beacraft, 49, white	Theodore McKeldin
George Grammer	White	35	M	June 11, 1954	Baltimore City	Murder	Dorothy Mae Grammer, 33, white (wife)	Theodore McKeldin
William C. Thomas	Black	32	M	June 10, 1955	Baltimore City	Murder-Rape-Burglary	Delia Honeyman, 67, white	Theodore McKeldin
Eddie Lee Daniels	Black	29	M	June 28, 1957	Montgomery	Murder-Robbery	Arthur E. Chyatte, 61, white	Theodore McKeldin
Carl Daniel Kier	Black	25	M	January 24, 1959	Frederick (Note: Change of venue from Baltimore County.)	Murder-Rape-Burglary	Myrtle Agnes Bopst, 47, white	J. Millard Tawes
Leonard M. Shockley	Black	17	M	April 10, 1959	Worcester (Note: Change of venue from Worcester County.)	Murder-Rape-Robbery	Sarah Hearne, 39, white	J. Millard Tawes
Nathaniel Lipscomb	Black	33	M	June 9, 1961	Baltimore City	Murder-Rape	Lottie Kight, 60, white (Note: Serial rapist and killer, also raped and murdered Mae Hall (37, black) and Pearl Wees (39, black) and raped a 30-year-old black woman, a 24-year-old black woman, a 15-year-old black girl.)	J. Millard Tawes

== 1994–2005 ==
Between the United States Supreme Court's Gregg v. Georgia decision upholding the use of the death penalty in the United States in 1976, and Maryland's abolition of the death penalty in 2013, a total of five people convicted of murder have been executed by the state of Maryland. All were executed by lethal injection.

No.	Name	Race	Age	Sex	Date of execution	County or City	Victim(s)	Governor
1	John Frederick Thanos	White	45	Male	May 17, 1994	Baltimore	Billy Winebrenner, Gregory Allen Taylor, and Melody Pistorio	William Donald Schaefer
2	Flint Gregory Hunt	Black	38	Male	July 2, 1997	Baltimore City	Baltimore City police officer Vincent Adolfo	Parris Glendening
3	Tyrone Delano Gilliam Jr.	Black	32	Male	November 16, 1998	Baltimore	Christine Doerfler	Parris Glendening
4	Steven Howard Oken	White	42	Male	June 17, 2004	Baltimore	Dawn Marie Garvin and Patricia Antoinette Hirt (Note: Also killed Lori Elizabeth Ward in Maine, but was executed for killing Garvin and Hirt.)	Robert Ehrlich
5	Wesley Eugene Baker	Black	47	Male	December 5, 2005	Baltimore	Jane Frances Tyson	Robert Ehrlich

== See also ==
- Capital punishment in Maryland
- Crime in Maryland
