= Flint Gregory Hunt =

American murderer (1959–1997)

- Hunt in 1984
- Born: June 27, 1959; Catawba, North Carolina, U.S.
- Died: July 2, 1997 (aged 38); Maryland Penitentiary, Maryland, U.S.
- Status: Executed by lethal injection
- Motive: To avoid arrest
- Convictions: First degree murder Assault; Armed robbery Auto theft Transporting stolen property
- Penalty: Death (July 1986 and December 1988)

Details
- Victims: Vincent Adolfo, 25
- Date: November 18, 1985

Flint Gregory Hunt (June 27, 1959 – July 2, 1997) was an American murderer executed by the state of Maryland in 1997. Hunt shot Baltimore police officer Vincent Adolfo twice in an East Baltimore alley on November 18, 1985, after Adolfo spotted him running from a stolen Cadillac. He was captured five days later at a bus station in Tulsa, Oklahoma. In June 1986, a Baltimore jury convicted Hunt of first-degree murder, and he was sentenced to death the following month. Eleven years later, Hunt was executed by lethal injection at the Maryland State Penitentiary at the age of 38.

== Early life ==
Hunt was the third of five children. According to his sisters, his mother beat him with switches and extension cords. Hunt's father drank himself to death when he was 17. Hunt spent much of his adult life in prison for convictions of assault, armed robbery, auto theft, and transporting stolen property.

== Murder ==
On the evening of November 18, 1985, while out on patrol in Baltimore, Maryland, 25-year-old Vincent J. Adolfo, a police officer, spotted a Cadillac with a missing window that was covered with plastic. He noted that four people were in the vehicle and decided to investigate. He soon learned the vehicle had been reported stolen. Adolfo called for backup while tailing the car. Two responding units set up a roadblock ahead. The driver of the stolen vehicle was Hunt, who jumped out of the vehicle as he got near the roadblock. The vehicle continued moving and collided with one of the patrol cars blocking the road. The officers apprehended the three remaining occupants.

Hunt meanwhile fled into an alleyway and was pursued by Adolfo on foot. Adolfo captured Hunt, placed him against a wall and prepared to handcuff him. As he attempted to detain Hunt, he was pushed back and knocked over. Hunt then took out a .357 Magnum and shot Adolfo once in the chest at close range. Hunt then shot him again in the back before fleeing the scene. Adolfo was transported to a nearby hospital where he was pronounced dead.

== Capture and trial ==
Hunt escaped and called his friend, asking if he could give him the murder weapon, informing him that he had just murdered a police officer with it. Hunt and his girlfriend then went to the home of his sister, but left when a television broadcast announced that Hunt was being sought in relation to the crime. The following day, Hunt and his girlfriend drove to Camden, New Jersey. During the drive, Hunt admitted to his girlfriend that he had killed Adolfo. The two then parted ways, with Hunt boarding a bus alone to Santa Monica, California. On November 23, he was apprehended at a Tulsa, Oklahoma bus station, after a woman on the bus alerted authorities when she spotted him acting suspiciously. He was held at a Tulsa jail before being extradited back to Maryland to face trial for murder. He was also charged with using a handgun in the commission of a crime of violence, as well as unlawfully carrying a handgun.

Hunt was convicted of first degree murder by a jury in June 1986. At the sentencing phase, prosecutors brought up his prior convictions, which Jurors found two mitigating circumstances, his childhood and an incident in July 1985, where he'd been stabbed 14 times by fellow inmates. However, the jury imposed a sentence of death after finding that the aggravating circumstances outweighed the mitigating circumstances. While in prison, Hunt committed a series of violations which led to his being isolated from other prisoners. Guards found him in possession of knives on two occasions. In one instance, the guards found a homemade weapon hidden in a light fixture in Hunt's cell. In the other prison guards saw a knife fall out of Hunt's underwear. Hunt also feigned an illness so that he could be sent to the hospital. He later wrote to a fellow inmate that he pretended to be ill to "see what my chances for freedom were."

When Hunt received another sentencing hearing on appeal in 1988, the prosecution introduced evidence of his misconduct in prison as further aggravation. He was resentenced to death in December 1988. He converted to Islam while on death row.

== Execution ==
Hunt originally requested to be executed by gas chamber. In an interview with The Baltimore Sun, Hunt revealed he had chosen this method because he wanted his death to look more like murder, as well as maximizing the violence of his execution carried out by the state. He later switched to lethal injection when he learned that his mother and bride wanted to witness the execution.

On July 2, 1997, after making a final statement in which he said a prayer in Arabic, Hunt was executed via lethal injection at the Maryland Penitentiary. He was pronounced dead at 12:25 a.m. He was the second person executed in Maryland since the 1976 Gregg v. Georgia decision, and the first inmate to be executed by the state involuntarily. He was also the 400th person to be executed in the United States since the reinstatement of capital punishment in 1976.

== See also ==
- List of people executed in Maryland
- List of people executed in the United States in 1997

Preceded by John Thanos	Executions carried out in Maryland	Succeeded by Tyrone X. Gilliam
