= Wesley Baker =

American murderer (1958–2005)

- Born: Wesley Eugene Baker; March 26, 1958; Baltimore, Maryland, U.S.
- Died: December 5, 2005 (aged 47); Metropolitan Transition Center, Baltimore, Maryland, U.S.
- Cause of death: Execution by lethal injection
- Motive: Robbery
- Convictions: First degree murder Robbery with a deadly weapon (2 counts); Unauthorized use of a motor vehicle Possession of a controlled dangerous substance Use of a handgun during the commission of a felony Unlawful possession of a handgun
- Penalty: Death

Details
- Victims: Jane Tyson, 49
- Date: June 6, 1991
- State: Maryland
- Locations: Westview Mall, Catonsville

Wesley Eugene Baker (March 26, 1958 – December 5, 2005) was an American convicted murderer executed by the U.S. state of Maryland. He was sentenced to death for the June 6, 1991, robbery and murder of Jane Frances Tyson, a mother and grandmother, in front of two of her grandchildren in Catonsville. Baker was the last person to be executed in Maryland before capital punishment was abolished in 2013.

== Early life ==
Baker was born to an underage rape victim and suffered physical and sexual abuse during his childhood by his mother, stepfather and two teenage girls. At age 15, he fathered a child with a 28-year-old heroin user while himself suffering from alcohol and heroin addiction.

Baker had several prior convictions. His first was for unauthorized use of a motor vehicle at 16 years old, for which he received 3 years in prison. In 1978, Baker was convicted of armed robbery and sentenced to 15 years in prison. Released in 1987, he was arrested again for drug and weapons-related offenses two years later. Baker was paroled in September 1990 and committed the murder that sent him to death row less than nine months later. He was still on parole at the time of the murder.

== Murder ==
Wesley Baker approached Jane Tyson, 49, on June 6, 1991, in the parking lot of Catonsville's Westview Mall as she got into her car with her grandchildren, a 6-year-old boy and a 4-year-old girl, after shoe shopping. He placed a gun to her ear and demanded her purse and then, without warning, fired the gun, killing her instantly. Baker fled to where his accomplice was waiting with a Chevrolet Blazer. A member of the public spotted the two fleeing in a car. He noted the license number and called the police, who apprehended Wesley Baker and Gregory Lawrence a short time later.

== Trial and appeals ==
Baker was convicted by a jury in the Circuit Court for Harford County on October 26, 1992, of first degree murder, robbery with a deadly weapon, and use of a handgun in the commission of a felony. Four days later, Circuit Court Judge Cypert O. Whitfill sentenced Baker to death for the murder and to two consecutive 20-year terms for the robbery and handgun convictions. On direct appeal, the Maryland Court of Appeals affirmed Baker's convictions and death sentence. Lawrence was convicted of the same charges a year earlier and received life in prison plus 33 years.

The court decided to uphold Baker's conviction, but there were doubts raised that Baker was the shooter. The 6-year-old boy said that the shooter ran to the driver's side of the car, while a member of the public said that Baker was sitting in the passenger seat. Tyson's blood was found on Baker, but police never tested the clothing of Lawrence. Fingerprints from Baker's right hand were found on Tyson's car. In 2000, the United States Court of Appeals for the Fourth Circuit observed that, if Baker were right-handed:

…one must wonder how it was possible for [Baker] to hold the gun to Tyson's head and leave his fingerprints on the [car], especially in light of the fact that the incident took only a matter of moments.

The court also wrote that the evidence that Baker was the shooter "was not overwhelming."

Baker received a stay of execution in 2002, days before he was scheduled to die, when Governor Parris N. Glendening imposed a moratorium on the death penalty in the state to allow a study by Professor Raymond Paternoster of the University of Maryland, College Park to be completed. Paternoster later found that the imposition of the death penalty in Maryland is racially biased. Paternoster found that prosecutors are 2.5 times more likely to seek the death penalty in cases where African Americans are accused of murdering whites than in cases where whites are accused of murdering whites.

On November 28, 2005, William Cardinal Keeler (Archbishop of Baltimore) visited Baker in prison. It was the first time the cardinal had visited a death row inmate. After meeting with him, Keeler made a personal plea, together with the two other Catholic bishops in Maryland, for the governor to grant clemency and commute the sentence to life imprisonment without parole. Governor Ehrlich lifted the moratorium when he was elected in 2003. Just prior to the execution, Ehrlich released a statement in which he said he had decided to deny clemency.

== Execution ==
Baker was executed on December 5, 2005, and was pronounced dead at 9:18 p.m. EST after being executed by lethal injection. He was the 1,002nd execution in the United States since the Gregg v. Georgia decision in 1976.

Baker was not asked by prison officials if he had a final statement. His lawyers said he had made his peace and expressed remorse for what he had done. Jennifer McMenamin, a reporter for the Baltimore Sun who witnessed the execution, said Baker did not show much reaction during the injection of the lethal doses of chemicals. His breathing did become more rapid and loud, with a gasping and sucking nature. Unlike other U.S. states, Maryland did not offer the condemned a special last meal; instead prisoners set to be executed received whatever was on the menu the day of their death. Baker's last meal consisted of breaded fish, pasta marinara, green beans, orange fruit punch, bread, and milk.

Maryland abolished the death penalty in 2013. On December 31, 2014, Gov. Martin O'Malley commuted the sentences of the final four condemned inmates to life imprisonment, making Baker's execution the last execution in the state of Maryland.

== See also ==
- Capital punishment in Maryland
- Capital punishment in the United States
- Dustin Higgs
- List of most recent executions by jurisdiction
- List of people executed in Maryland
- List of people executed in the United States in 2005

Executions carried out in Maryland
Preceded by Steven Oken June 17, 2004	Wesley Baker; December 5, 2005	Succeeded by none
Executions carried out in the United States
Preceded by Shawn Paul Humphries – South Carolina December 2, 2005	Wesley Baker – Maryland; December 5, 2005	Succeeded by Stanley Williams – California December 13, 2005
