= Westview Mall =

Coordinates: 39.28877°N 76.73562°W

Westview Shopping Center
- Location: Catonsville, Maryland, U.S.
- Opened: 1958
- Developer: Joseph Meyerhoff
- Owner: CB Richard Ellis
- Num. of stores: 80
- Num. of anchor tenants: 2
- Floor area: 595,243 square feet (55,299.9 m^{2}) (original mall); 610,103 square feet (56,680.4 m^{2}) (after 2003)
- Floors: 1

Westview Mall is a shopping mall located in Catonsville, Maryland, United States. The mall originally opened in 1958 as an outdoor strip mall, but was converted into an indoor shopping center in 1968. The original anchors were Hutzler's and Food Fair. Other tenants included G. C. Murphy, Western Auto, and White Coffee Pot. In 1969, Stewart's was added as a third anchor.

Stewart's became Caldor in 1983 and Hutzler's was sold to Hochschild-Kohn. By 1990, the mall had 80 stores.

In 2002, the mall returned to its original outdoor status, when the indoor section, which had largely failed, was converted into big box stores such as Sam's Club and Marshalls, while Lowe's occupies the space where Stewart's had been. As of 2022, the mall is owned by CB Richard Ellis.

== Murder case ==
Westview Mall came into the news in 1991, when a well publicized murder took place in the parking lot. On June 6 of that year, 49-year-old Jane Tyson was murdered in the presence of her grandchildren, ages 6 and 4. Wesley Baker was convicted of the crime, and was executed on December 5, 2005, after more than 13 years on Maryland's death row. Baker was the last person to be executed by Maryland before the state abolished capital punishment.
