= Steven Oken =

American spree killer (1962–2004)

Steven Howard Oken
- Oken after his arrest in Maine
- Born: January 29, 1962; Baltimore, Maryland, U.S.
- Died: June 17, 2004 (aged 42); Metropolitan Transition Center, Baltimore, Maryland, U.S.
- Cause of death: Execution by lethal injection
- Convictions: Maryland; First degree murder (2 counts); First degree sexual offense Burglary; Use of a handgun during a crime of violence Maine; Murder; Armed robbery Theft
- Penalty: Maryland; Death (January 18, 1991); Maine; Life imprisonment (March 26, 1989)

Details
- Victims: Dawn Marie Garvin, 25; Patricia Antoinette Hirt, 43; Lori Elizabeth Ward, 25
- Span of crimes: November 1 – November 16, 1987
- Country: United States
- States: Maryland and Maine
- Date apprehended: November 17, 1987

Steven Howard Oken (January 29, 1962 – June 17, 2004) was an American spree killer who raped and murdered three women in Maryland and Maine in November 1987. He was sentenced to death and executed in Maryland by lethal injection in 2004.

== Murders ==
On November 1, 1987, Steven Oken, then 25, murdered 20-year-old Dawn Marie Garvin (nee Romano). She was found by her father on the bed in her White Marsh apartment, naked, with a condiment bottle protruding from her vagina and blood streaming from her forehead. Despite efforts of her father and paramedics to administer CPR, she was dead. An autopsy later revealed that she had died as the result of two contact gunshot wounds; one of the bullets entered at her left eyebrow and the other at her right ear.

Less than two weeks after Oken murdered Dawn Garvin, he sexually assaulted and murdered his sister-in-law, 43-year-old Patricia Antoinette Hirt, at his White Marsh townhouse, dumping her body along White Marsh Boulevard. He then fled to Kittery, Maine, where he murdered 25-year-old Lori Ward, the desk clerk at the motel in which he was staying.

== Trials and execution ==
He was arrested in Maine on November 17, 1987, and was ultimately convicted and sentenced to life without parole for the murder of Ward. Oken was then returned to Maryland where he faced separate prosecutions for charges arising out of the other two murders.

Oken was found guilty and sentenced to die for the killing of Dawn Garvin in 1991. Following his conviction for Garvin's murder Oken pleaded guilty to killing Patricia Hirt, and received an additional life sentence.

Then-Governor Robert Ehrlich declined clemency and on June 17, 2004, at 9:18 p.m. local time, Steven Oken was pronounced dead after his execution by lethal injection at the Metropolitan Transition Center in Baltimore at age 42.

His last meal was a chicken patty, with potatoes and gravy, green beans, marble cake, milk, and fruit punch – the regular prison meal that day.

== Personal life ==
Oken was adopted by a Jewish family, and attended Randallstown High School where he graduated in 1980. He stole drugs from his adoptive father's pharmacy and was drinking heavily.

== See also ==
- Capital punishment in Maryland
- Capital punishment in the United States
- List of people executed in Maryland
- List of people executed in the United States in 2004

Preceded by Tyrone X. Gilliam	Executions carried out in Maryland	Succeeded by Wesley Eugene Baker
