= Tyrone Delano Gilliam Jr. =

American murderer (1966–1998)

- Born: August 29, 1966; Baltimore County, Maryland, U.S.
- Died: November 16, 1998 (aged 32); Maryland Penitentiary, Maryland, U.S.
- Other name: Tyrone X. Gilliam
- Relatives: Makayla Gilliam-Price (niece)
- Status: Executed by lethal injection
- Convictions: First degree murder Kidnapping; Robbery with a deadly weapon Use of a handgun during a crime of violence
- Penalty: Death (October 31, 1989)
- Accomplices: Kelvin Drummond; Tony Drummond

Details
- Victims: 1
- Date: December 2, 1988

Tyrone Delano Gilliam Jr. (August 29, 1966 – November 16, 1998) was an American convicted murderer executed by the state of Maryland in 1998. Gilliam was convicted and sentenced to death for the kidnapping and murder of 21-year-old Christine J. Doerfler on December 2, 1988.

== Murder ==
On the evening of the murder, Gilliam was drinking and using drugs with Kelvin Drummond and his brother, Tony Drummond. The three men car-jacked Doerfler as she got out of her car in a parking lot, and when they found that she only had three dollars on her, they forced her to go to an ATM and withdraw cash. During the drive to the ATM, they changed their minds, and after pulling over in a secluded area, Gilliam shot Doerfler in the head with a sawed-off shotgun. Gilliam and both of the Drummond brothers were arrested three days later after they attempted to rob a convenience store. Police found the murder weapon in Gilliam's car, and after Kelvin Drummond named Gilliam as the shooter, Gilliam confessed.

== Trial ==
Gilliam chose to have his case tried by a judge rather than a jury. Judge John Fader of the Circuit Court for Baltimore County found Gilliam guilty of first-degree murder, robbery with a dangerous weapon, use of a handgun in the commission of a felony and kidnapping. On October 31, 1989, Gilliam was sentenced to death for the murder of Christine Doerfler. Tony Drummond was convicted separately and received a sentence of life without the possibility of parole, while Kelvin Drummond agreed to plead guilty and testify against Gilliam. In exchange for his testimony and guilty plea he received a sentence of life with the possibility of parole.

== Appeals ==
Gilliam's initial direct appeal to the Maryland Court of Appeals was rejected in 1990, and the US Supreme Court refused to hear Gilliam's case in 1991. Gilliam then filed a petition for post-conviction relief in Baltimore County Circuit Court. The court denied relief, and Gilliam's appeals to the Maryland Court of Appeals and the US Supreme Court were refused in 1993 and 1994 respectively. After his attempt to file a second post-conviction petition in the state courts was rejected Gilliam made a petition for habeas corpus relief with the US District Court for the District of Maryland. In November 1996, the court ruled that Gilliam's death sentence should be vacated based on ineffective assistance of counsel, however the state filed a Rule 59(e) motion to alter or amend the judgment, and in April 1997, the court reversed itself and denied Gilliam's habeas petition. Gilliam appealed the district court's decision to the US Court of Appeals for the Fourth Circuit, which affirmed the district court's decision in January 1998. On October 5, 1998, the US Supreme Court refused to hear the case. That same day Judge Fader signed a death warrant which went into effect on November 16, 1998.

== Execution ==
Gilliam was executed by lethal injection at the Maryland Penitentiary on November 16, 1998. He was pronounced dead at 10:27 p.m. Gilliam's last hope had been a petition for clemency to Governor Parris Glendening, which was rejected the previous day. Two last-minute appeals to the US Supreme Court were also turned down. None of Doerfler's family chose to attend the execution. Gilliam did not apologize or express remorse in the death chamber, and his last words were "Allah, forgive them for what they do." Like all inmates executed in Maryland, Gilliam was not given a special last meal and his closest relatives were also not allowed to attend his execution. He was 32 years old.

== See also ==
- List of people executed in Maryland
- List of people executed in the United States in 1998

Preceded by Flint Gregory Hunt	Executions carried out in Maryland	Succeeded by Steven Howard Oken
