= John Thanos =

American murderer (1949–1994)

- Thanos in 1967
- Born: John Frederick Thanos; March 28, 1949; Dundalk, Maryland, U.S.
- Died: May 17, 1994 (aged 45); Maryland Penitentiary, Baltimore, Maryland, U.S.
- Cause of death: Execution by lethal injection
- Convictions: First degree murder (2 counts); Kidnapping; Rape; Armed robbery (2 counts)
- Penalty: Death

Details
- Victims: Greg Taylor, 18; Billy Winebrenner, 16; Melody Pistorio, 14
- Date: August 31–September 3, 1990
- Weapon: Sawed off .22 caliber semi-automatic rifle
- Date apprehended: September 4, 1990

John Frederick Thanos (March 28, 1949 – May 17, 1994) was an American spree killer who was convicted in 1992 of the murders of three teenagers: Gregory Taylor, Billy Winebrenner, and Melody Pistorio. He was executed for the murders in 1994, becoming the first person to be executed in Maryland since 1961.

== Early life ==
Thanos was born in Dundalk, Maryland to John Steven and Pattie Thanos. Steven was described as a mentally ill World War II veteran who severely abused John Thanos and even drugged his wife. Thanos was expelled from school and spent many years in and out of prison for various crimes he committed.

== Criminal history ==
In October 1969, Thanos assaulted and raped a woman in Rosedale, Maryland. He was charged for the offense and was sentenced to twenty-one years in prison. At his trial, he threatened the judge, and later attempted to break out of prison in 1971. He succeeded in escaping but was recaptured shortly afterwards and had eight years added to his sentence. Thanos was released from prison in April 1986. However, he returned only a month later after he committed an armed robbery at a convenience store. He was sentenced to a further eight years in prison. On April 15, 1990, Thanos was accidentally released early due to a mistake by a prison official who was later fired.

Upon his release, Thanos went to work as a bricklayer and then as a chicken processor in Salisbury. In the summer of 1990, he exposed himself to a woman who gave him a ride. The woman charged him for the offense and Thanos feared he would be returned to prison. Thanos would later reveal in a videotaped confession that he embarked on a crime spree because he was worried his parole was going to be revoked.

== Murder spree ==
On August 29, 1990, Thanos quit his job and purchased a .22 caliber semi-automatic rifle. He sawed the barrel down so he could fit the weapon in a black doctor's bag which he carried around with him. That same night, he robbed a cab driver at gunpoint and forced him into the trunk of the vehicle, threatening to kill him if he refused to comply with his demands. He was convicted of kidnapping and armed robbery in this case and later received a 50-year sentence.

On August 31, Thanos encountered 18-year-old Greg Taylor while hitchhiking. Holding him at gunpoint while in his car, Thanos ordered Taylor to drive to a wooded area along a deserted logging road, where he intended to tie him to a tree. When Taylor refused to comply with his demands, Thanos laid Taylor down and murdered him by shooting him in the head three times. He then stole Taylor's car and altered his appearance to look more like him.

On September 1, Thanos arrived at a gas station and traded his father's watch to 16-year-old Billy Winebrenner for $20 and some gas. The two made a deal in which Thanos could return to the gas station and pay $60 to get the watch back. The following day, Thanos robbed a convenience store in Salisbury and shot the clerk in the head. The clerk survived the shooting and Thanos stole $96. On September 3, Thanos returned to the gas station and encountered Winebrenner and his 14-year-old girlfriend, Melody Pistorio, who had come to the gas station to keep him company. Winebrenner did not have the watch with him, as he had given it to Pistorio, who had left it at home in her jewelry box. Enraged, Thanos took out his gun and robbed the gas station at gunpoint, demanding Winebrenner fill his bag with cash. The pair handed over all the cash from the register. Thanos then fatally shot each of them twice in the head and fled the store.

== Capture ==
On September 4, Thanos was spotted driving north by Salisbury police. He matched the description of a person wanted in a recent armed robbery. The police pulled him over and Thanos stopped his vehicle. As police approached him, Thanos began shooting at them, causing the officers to return fire. No one was hit during the shootout and Thanos drove away. He abandoned his vehicle near some woods and fled on foot towards a highway. He then flagged down a passing motorist and forced his way into the car, taking the motorist hostage and threatening him with a gun. The motorist obeyed Thanos' demands and drove him out of the state. The pair headed into Delaware where a Smyrna police officer spotted them.

The officer followed the car into a parking lot and police surrounded the vehicle. The motorist then fled from the car on foot and Thanos began shooting at the police. Three officers returned fire at Thanos and a shootout erupted in the parking lot. Thanos then surrendered after he emptied his gun. No one was injured in the shootout but several vehicles were hit during the exchange of gunfire. On September 5, Delaware police turned over Thanos to Maryland State Police.

== Trial ==
At his trial he taunted the families of his victims, saying he wished he could dig up their bodies and defile their corpses. Thanos stated: "their cries bring laughter from the darkest caverns of my soul. I don't believe I could satisfy my thirst yet in this matter unless I was to be able to dig these brats' bones up out of their graves right now and beat them into powder and urinate on them and then stir it into a murky yellowish elixir and serve it up to their loved ones" during his sentencing hearing for the murder of Winebrenner and Pistorio.

His attorney later said of Thanos: "What he did was reprehensible, that's true... the other thing is he is extremely damaged. He is an extremely damaged human being. And really, in our society we should not kill sick people. He really is a sick person."

Thanos waived all of his appeals and refused to fight his death sentence after he was convicted and sentenced to death. At that time, death by gas chamber was the only means of execution provided by the state of Maryland. Thanos agreed to a proposal by a lawyer of another prisoner sentenced to death to have his execution videotaped and his EEG data recorded, in an attempt to raise evidence that execution by gas chamber is cruel and unusual, as defined by the 8th Amendment, and thus unconstitutional. The legislature of Maryland responded by making lethal injection the primary means of execution in January 1994.

== Execution ==
Thanos was executed on May 17, 1994, by the state of Maryland via lethal injection, becoming the first person to be executed in Maryland since 1961, and the state's first post-Gregg execution. He was also the first person to be executed in Maryland via lethal injection. Thanos was 45 years old; his last words were "Adios!"

== See also ==
- Capital punishment in Maryland
- Capital punishment in the United States
- List of people executed in Maryland
- List of people executed in the United States in 1994
- Joseph C. Palczynski, a spree killer who engaged in a stand-off in Dundalk, Maryland

Preceded by Nathaniel Lipscomb	Executions carried out in Maryland	Succeeded by Flint Gregory Hunt
