= Makayla Gilliam-Price =

U.S. social activist

- Education: Baltimore City College
- Occupation: Social activist
- Relatives: Tyrone Delano Gilliam Jr. (uncle)

Makayla Gilliam-Price is an American social activist who combats racism, police brutality, and school segregation and tracking.

== Life ==
Gilliam-Price was born to Zelda and John. As an infant in 1998, she attended protests with her parents against her uncle Tyrone Delano Gilliam Jr.'s death sentence. He was executed by lethal injection in November that year. Gilliam-Price graduated from Baltimore City College in 2016. While in high school, she co-founded City Bloc, a grassroots organization. She also led a school walkout to protest arming school resource officers. She attended a debate camp which helped develop her voice.

Gilliam-Price is a social activist who is interested in combatting racism in multiple sectors including police brutality, school segregation and tracking, and immigration. In October 2015, after the killing of Freddie Gray, Gilliam-Price was among the group that was arrested as part of a sit-in protest at the Baltimore City Hall. In January 2016, her blog post calling out Victor Gearhart, a high-ranked Baltimore police officer and Baltimore City Fraternal Order of Police vice president, for his racist tweets led to his removal and reassignment. Gilliam-Price's activism was featured in the 2017 documentary, Baltimore Rising.
