= Nathaniel Lipscomb =

Executed American serial killer (1929–1961)

- Lipscomb being brought to jail by Baltimore detectives in 1959
- Born: 1929; Gaffney, South Carolina, U.S.
- Died: June 9, 1961 (aged 31–32); Maryland Penitentiary, Baltimore, Maryland, U.S.
- Cause of death: Execution by gas chamber
- Other names: "The Dawn Strangler" "The Early Morning Bandit"
- Convictions: First degree murder (3 counts); Rape (3 counts)
- Penalty: Death

Details
- Victims: 3–4
- Span of crimes: 1958 – 1959 (possibly 1951)
- Country: United States
- States: Maryland (possibly North Carolina)
- Date apprehended: April 17, 1959

Nathaniel Lipscomb (1929 – June 9, 1961), known as The Dawn Strangler, was an American serial killer responsible for three rape-murders in Baltimore, Maryland, committed between 1958 and 1959, in addition to several sexual assaults and a possible previous murder committed in Charlotte, North Carolina. Convicted for his crimes, he was executed at the Maryland Penitentiary, the last convict to be executed in the state prior to Furman v. Georgia.

== Early life ==
Born in Gaffney, South Carolina, in 1929, not much is known about Lipscomb's upbringing, but according to his later confessions, he was known to be a persistent voyeur who had been jailed in his hometown for spying on a woman undressing herself. His second known offence was committed in nearby North Carolina, where he served a prison sentence for stealing a bike. After his release, it was said that he moved between Gaffney and Blacksburg.

== Murders ==
=== Mrs. Howard Maxwell ===
On May 14, 1951, the Mecklenburg County Police Department were called in the afternoon about a suspected murder that had occurred in Charlotte. The caller said that her granddaughter, 4-year-old Diane Maxwell, whose head was cut and bloodied, told her that a man had burgled their home and "cut" her mother. Upon arriving at the scene, patrolmen discovered the body of Mrs. Maxwell lying in a pool of her own blood, with stab wounds over her left eye that penetrated into her brain and another into her breast. In addition, her throat had been cut from side to side, leaving a deep gash on it. In the subsequent autopsy, the coroner determined that the woman had been attacked while she was in bed, with the killer attempting to slash her daughter, who slept in another bed across the room. It was said that despite her fatal injuries, Mrs. Maxwell stood up and walked to her daughter's side and stood for a second before collapsing to the ground. The murder weapon was supposedly a knife, with either a gap in the blade or a dull end, as there were notable irregularities in the victim's wounds.

While the killer had left little in the way of physical evidence, witnesses recalled seeing a black man walking towards the Maxwell household, and later fleeing after the killing. In the following weeks, hundreds of potential suspects were questioned, and on May 27, 1951, police stopped a car whose occupants were suspected of being drunk. When they saw that the driver, Nathaniel Lipscomb, tried to throw away what looked like a dagger, he was arrested for driving without a license and carrying a concealed weapon. The day after his arrest, Lipscomb unexpectedly confessed to killing Maxwell, but claimed it had been an accident: according to his claims, he knocked on the door of the Maxwell home to ask for a drink of water, but when nobody answered, he entered inside. At that time, Mrs. Maxwell awoke and attacked him, and, in the ensuing struggle, he accidentally slashed her throat. To prove his guilt, he offered to take them to his family home, where he presented them with a pearl-handled knife, hidden in a box stored in the garage, claiming that it was the murder weapon. Detectives dismissed his claim, but upon examining the dagger he had discarded, which was dulled, they began to take his claims seriously. However, much to their dismay, Nathaniel retracted his confession, and in the weeks following, he shifted between confessing and denying the murder. During the month of June, he was ordered to undertake two lie detector tests, the first which determined that he was probably the killer, while the other - that he wasn't. While they had issues proving whether he was guilty or not, the detectives realized that their suspect was likely mentally unwell, and so, they took him to the Charlotte Mental Health Clinic for a psychiatric evaluation. After several examinations, clinic officials reported that Lipscomb was an impulsive sexual degenerate and mentally handicapped, with a predisposition for molesting others. He was sent for a second round of evaluations at the Cherry Hospital in Goldsboro, where doctors determined that while he had a low IQ (a total of 51), he didn't suffer from any visual disorders and was capable of distinguishing right from wrong. Despite this, police officials doubted that they would convict him, and requested that he be detained in the clinic as a "criminally dangerous person".

In October, Lipscomb was released from Cherry Hospital, and subsequently vanished. Upon learning this, authorities searched for him at his family home, where his sister and mother lived, but they told them that they had run him off, as they were afraid of him. According to his mother, he claimed that he was going to Norfolk, Virginia, in search of a job. For the next eight years, Lipscomb remained under the radar, until his arrest as suspect in three rape-murders.

=== The Dawn Strangler ===
Between December 1958 and April 1959, Baltimore was struck by a series of mysterious killings, always aimed at older women who lived within several blocks of one another. Each victim was found beaten, raped and subsequently strangled in an alley near their homes. Since all of them showed signs of being committed by the same offender, the killer was nicknamed "The Dawn Strangler", as his crimes always happened in the early morning.

The first victim was 38-year-old black woman Mae Hall, whose body was found in a neighbor's yard on 1300 East Eager Street on December 9, 1958. She had been strangled to death, and it was determined that she had been dead for at least several days prior to the body's discovery. Five days later, 57-year-old Lottie Kight, a white practical nurse, left in the early morning to sweep the sidewalk in front of her house. About two hours later, her body was found two doors away in a narrow alleyway, with a handkerchief wrapped around her neck. Her fists were clenched and fingers bloodied, indicating that she unsuccessfully tried to resist her attacker. Authorities started questioning various suspects about the killing, making several undergo lie detector tests, but all were eventually released, with the murders halting at a standstill. It was until April 9 of the following year, when the body of 38-year-old Pearl Weiss, another black woman, was found in an alleyway only five blocks away from where Kight had been murdered. She had been strangled, her neck bruised and her fingers bloodied, with her killer apparently stealing her shoes.

== Trial, imprisonment and execution ==
On April 21, 1959, local policemen were patrolling the streets of Baltimore in the early morning when they were alerted by a woman screaming. After they headed in the direction where the screams came from, they found an unfamiliar black man skulking in the alleyway. They arrested him for questioning, and upon rummaging through his pockets, they found four pairs of women's panties. While they were unable to locate the source of the screams, they booked the suspect in jail over the weekend for further questioning. In there, he told that his name was Nathaniel Lipscomb, that he has lived in Baltimore for the last five years and worked as a laborer and restaurant worker. When asked about why he had women's panties in his pockets, Lipscomb explained that he had snatched them from clotheslines, something he did regularly. After they looked into his past, authorities learned that he had been questioned for other murders committed in the city during the last few years: in particular, he had been extensively investigated for the August 1958 rape and murder of 57-year-old grandmother Ethel Francis, whose battered body was found at a golf course in Clifton Park.

Eventually, Lipscomb wrote a written confession in which he professed his guilt for the murder of Lottie Kight, with other statements in it appearing convincing enough to put him as the killer of both Hall and Weiss. Like with the Maxwell killing years earlier, he retracted the confession and insisted on his innocence. After a short trial, he was found guilty of the three murders, showing no visible emotion at his trial. He was sentenced to death, a verdict contested by his attorneys, who claimed that their client was insane at the time of the murders. The decision was appealed a few months later, but ultimately rejected by the Maryland Court of Appeals. On June 9, 1961, Nathaniel Lipscomb was executed in the Maryland State Penitentiary's gas chamber, the last inmate to be executed in the state pre-Furman v. Georgia.

== See also ==
- List of people executed in Maryland
- List of people executed in the United States in 1961
- List of serial killers in the United States

== Bibliography ==
- Daniel Allen Hearn (July 4, 2015). Legal Executions in Delaware, the District of Columbia, Maryland, Virginia and West Virginia: A Comprehensive Registry, 1866-1962. McFarland & Company. ASIN B0134XZBZ8.

Preceded by Leonard Shockley	Executions carried out in Maryland	Succeeded by John Thanos
