= Metropolitan Transition Center =

Prison in Baltimore, Maryland

Coordinates: 39°17′57″N 76°36′31″W

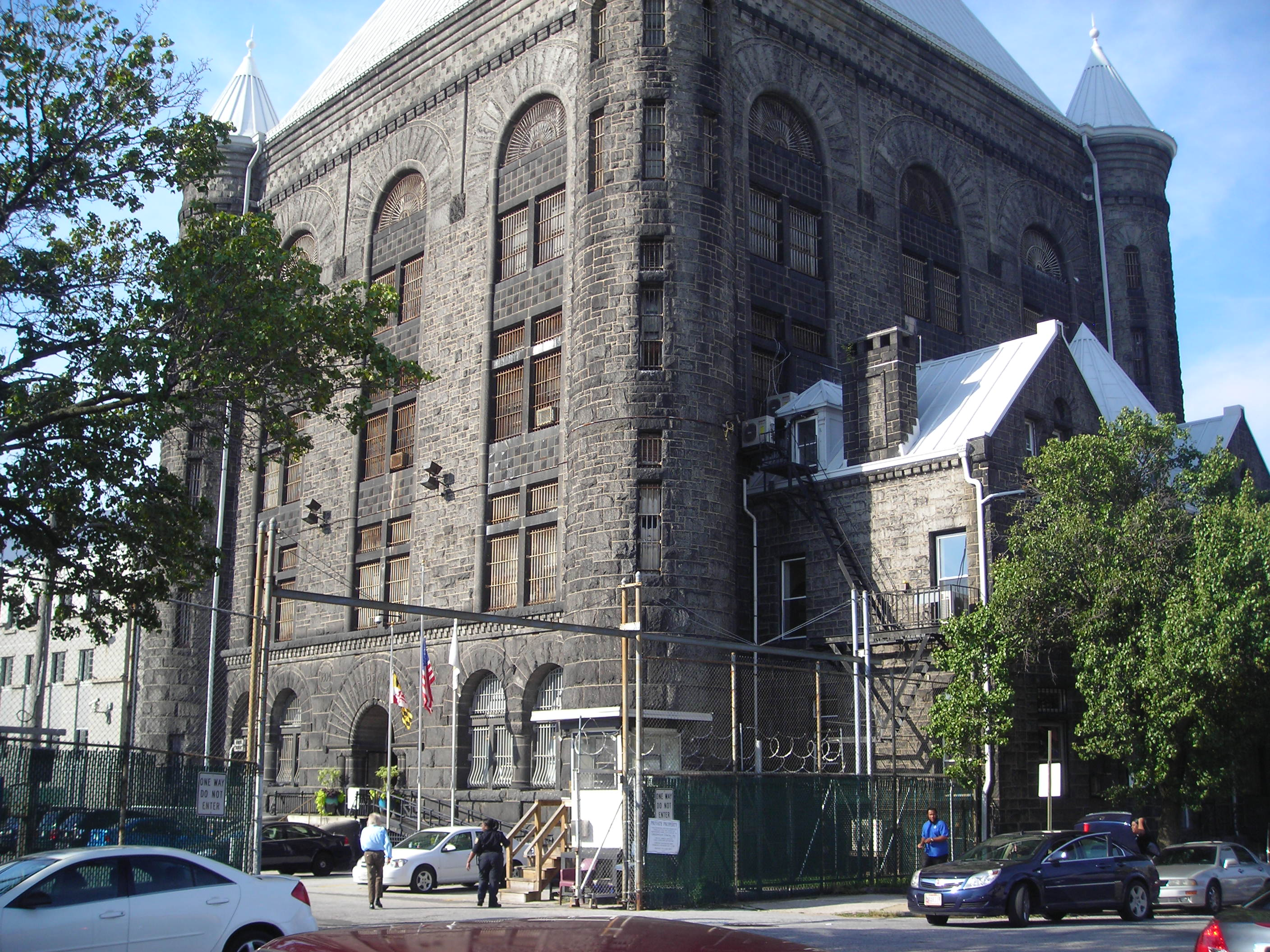
- Maryland Penitentiary, Gate 3
- Interactive map of Metropolitan Transition Center
- Location: 954 Forrest Street Baltimore, Maryland
- Status: open
- Security class: Maximum pre-trial
- Opened: 1812
- Managed by: Maryland Department of Public Safety and Correctional Services

The Maryland Metropolitan Transition Center (MTC), formerly known as the Maryland Penitentiary, is a Maryland Department of Public Safety and Correctional Services pre-trial maximum security prison located in Baltimore facing Greenmount Avenue between Forrest Street and East Madison Street. It was established in 1811 as the first prison in the state and the second of its kind in the country and the original buildings faced towards East Madison Street above the east bank of the Jones Falls stream and adjacent to the old stone walls of the Baltimore City Jail (now renamed the Baltimore City Detention Center), earlier established in 1801, rebuilt in 1857–1859, and later in 1959–1965.

Now known as the MTC, the prison still houses Maryland's now decommissioned death chamber. The Maryland Correctional Adjustment Center, across the road, housed male "death row" inmates until June 2010, when they were moved to the North Branch Correctional Institution near Cumberland in the western portion of the state in Allegany County.

== History ==
When it was established in 1811, the Maryland Penitentiary was much smaller than it is today. Before its opening, convicted criminals were put in county jails or a workhouse where they were employed in public projects such as road building. Inmates were involved in labor for the majority of their time; the area where they worked was silent and they were kept in solitary confinement at all other times.

There were three floors consisting of nine cells holding around 10 people each. Women, however, were housed separately and were forbidden, at all times, to have any communication with men. Compared with other prisons, convicts were treated reasonably well and were kept in hygienic conditions with an ample supply of food. The money they earned from their work was paid back to the prison to compensate for their stay.

During the 1800s, the prison underwent several construction phases, with a massive granite stone central tower with the landmark pyramid roof, including a new western and south wing in the late 1890s facing Greenmount Avenue towards the south and along Forest Street to the west. Additional wings anticipated to be constructed with a squared-off design for the complex were never completed. Part of this modern (late 19th Century) construction included new cells for solitary confinement at night.

Shortly after the Civil War, the prison came under investigation regarding poor working and living conditions and it was discovered that the prison was handing over profits to the state treasury at the expense of the inmates. There followed a "bitter feud among prison administrators" and a new state Prison Board came into effect, which eventually implemented some changes, including the creation of a prison farm for men (constructed in 1878 as the "House of Correction" in Jessup) and a separate building for women (also built in Jessup). The board also created a prison library and a new education program for inmates, in particular a night school for those who could not read, under sponsorship of the Baltimore City Public Schools.

Following these reforms, a new warden was appointed, John F. Weyler. He was sworn in on the May 31, 1888 after which he maintained control for 24 years, longer than anyone before him or after him. He initiated many changes for the Penitentiary including re-building the majority of the prison and adding several new buildings. New cells were larger, lit with electric lights, better ventilated, had sliding steel doors and, for the first time ever, flushable enamel toilets. The architect was Jackson C. Gott.

During his time in control, Weyler had a reputation for being a good and fair warden, but this image was completely destroyed with the publication of the "Report of Maryland Penitentiary Penal Commission" of 1913 "charging his administration with mismanagement, cruelty and corruption." This followed the resignation of a prison guard who had cited poor conditions and mistreatment of prisoners as the reasons for his leaving. He was appalled at the methods of punishment including "chaining," which involved hand cuffing inmates and hanging them by the wrists slightly above the ground. This marked the start of a three-man commission to explore every aspect of the prison.

During their time in the prison, they made many startling discoveries. The conditions they encountered were appalling. Despite new cells, some men and all of the women still remained in "dungeon" like cells. Mattresses were bloodstained from bed bug bites and cobwebs were everywhere. These poor conditions were also apparent in the kitchens with omnipresent cockroaches and flies. Inmates also complained about the food, further investigation found meat to be unrefrigerated. Wyler also use contract labor (sending inmates to work outside the prison for another employer) and paid them little or nothing. He was found guilty of stealing up to three thousand pounds of bread crumbs a week to feed the animals on his farm. Eventually Weyler retired to avoid the outcome of the commission and thus he left with no legal charges. However, his reputation as a model prison warden was ruined.

When John F. Weyler ended his control of the prison, the years that followed were relatively stable. Public interest in prison matters was dwindling. The wardens who followed included Patrick J. Brady and Edwin T. Swenson, who ran the prison for long, stable periods of time. However, in 1920 there came a series of riots, which prompted a temporary warden until a more forceful one could be found. It was decided that the existing warden wasn't capable of maintaining order among the inmates which led to the rule of army colonel, Claude B. Sweezey. Sweezey establish the Sweezey Club, which rewarded good inmates for their behavior. However, his control was jeopardized following the attempted escape of 6 inmates. This prompted media interest, which criticized the Sweezey Club. Once the inmates recognized the negative impact this had on them, even the attempted escapees testified in favor of the club.

Additional facilities were constructed with a stone castle-like structure as another "penal farm" for men in Hagerstown in the early 1930s, which became the Maryland Correctional Institution.

Throughout the 20th century, there were more attempted escapes, one of the most famous being by that of Joseph Holmes in 1951. He dug out from underneath his cell, under the wall and out to freedom. This prompted, again, a change of warden. The newly appointed warden, Vernon L. Pepersack, tried pleasing the prisoners more to maintain order. His methods included the establishment of a library system, borrowing books from libraries outside the prison. He also arranged entertainment for the inmates, notably wrestling. This resulted in a stable period throughout the 1950s. Until the 1960s the prison had been separated by race. Because of the Civil Rights Movement, the inmates became more racially integrated. More varied entertainment was provided, for example, the black comedian, Dick Gregory.

However, the 1960s also brought other changes into the prison. There was a series of riots in the late 1960s, one of the most notable being that of July 8, 1966. It occurred when inmate John E. Jones fought the correctional officers escorting him back to his cell. Overnight, rumors spread that Jones had been beaten by the officers. The next morning, six men in the mess hall started a rampage that spread outside to approximately a thousand men. Four buildings were set on fire, including the commissary, which the inmates looted and then burnt. However, around 3 hours later, there appeared to be a psychological turning point and the men started to return to their cells. Following this there were more riots on a smaller scale accompanied by many warden changes. One of the final large riots was in July 1972. Inmate Lascell Gallop was working in the kitchen and threw an acid solution in an officer's face. Twelve other inmates then began to smash windows and set things ablaze. They took officers hostage and when their demands were not met, trashed the prison offices before threatening to kill the officers if firemen were allowed in. A chance was taken and the firemen were allowed to proceed into the prison. The hostages lived, but many of the inmates' demands were met, which angered the prison workers. This resulted in three employee walkouts before the prison functioned normally again.

Towards the end of the 20th century, overcrowding became problematic. This caused tensions among inmates and officers, and there was an incident in 1984 where an officer, Herman Toulson, was murdered by an inmate. There was another riot in July, 1988. However, these tensions eased and the prison dynamic stabilized. The Maryland Penitentiary had its named changed to the Maryland Metropolitan Transition Center in 1998.

From 1923 to 2013, the Maryland Penitentiary/Maryland Metropolitan Transition Center was the location of all executions in Maryland. A total of 84 prisoners, all men, were executed in the prison: 75 by hanging, four by gas asphyxiation, and five by lethal injection.

== Modern Section ==
As of 2003, the prison was all security levels and held 1,270 with an average daily population of 1,762. The cost of care was $64.69 per day for each inmate. Figures also show that there were 492 staff, of which the majority were female. Records also indicate that inmates and staff were both overwhelmingly either African-American or Hispanic American. The current warden running the institution is Simon Wainwright.

The lethal injection table and gas chamber were located together on the second floor of the prison.

== Notable inmates ==
- Stevenson Archer (1827–1898), congressman accused of embezzlement; served 5 years
- Wesley Baker (1958–2005), murderer; executed by lethal injection; last person to be executed in Maryland
- Charles S. Dutton (born 1951), actor; served time at MTC for robbery, handgun charges, and crimes committed in prison; released in 1976
- Tyrone Delano Gilliam Jr. (1966–1998), murderer; executed by lethal injection
- Samuel Green (c.1802–1877), freedman sentenced for owning an anti-slavery novel; pardoned in 1862
- Nathaniel Lipscomb (1929–1961), serial killer; executed by gas asphyxiation
- Steven Oken (1962–2004), spree killer; executed by lethal injection
- Leonard Shockley (1941/42–1959), juvenile murderer; executed by gas asphyxiation
- John Thanos (1949–1994), spree killer; executed by lethal injection
- Richard Whittemore (1901–1926), escapee gang leader; executed by hanging

== Notable staff ==
- Henry Willis Baxley (1803-1876), attending physician
- Joshua Van Sant (1803-1884), former director
