= Stein (surname) =

Stein is a surname with different origins. It is a common German name. The name derived from German ([ʃtaɪn]) means "stone" or "rock". Stein is also a Scottish name (/stiːn/; also spelled Steen), which originated as a local equivalent or variant of Steven.

Notable people with the surname include:

== A ==
- Aaron Marc Stein (1906–1985), nom-de-plume of American novelist George Bagby
- Abby Stein (born 1991), transgender activist, writer, and public speaker
- Adam Stein, American film director and screenwriter
- Allan Stein, nephew of Gertrude Stein and the title of a novel by Matthew Stadler
- Alon Stein (born 1991), Israeli basketball player
- Andrew Stein (born 1945), American politician
- Andy Stein, American saxophone and violin player
- Anna Harris Stein, American civic leader and First Lady of North Carolina
- Arthur Stein (political scientist) (born 1950), American professor of political science
- Aurel Stein (1862–1943), Hungarian-British archaeologist
- Axel Stein (born 1982), German actor

== B ==
- Ben Stein (born 1944), American actor, writer, and attorney
- Blake Stein (born 1973), American baseball pitcher
- Boris Shtein (or Stein) (1892–1961), Soviet diplomat
- Brian Stein (born 1957), English association football player
- Burton Stein (1926–1996), American historian

== C ==
- Charles Stein (disambiguation), several people
- Charlotte von Stein (1742–1827), lady-in-waiting at the court in Weimar
- Clarence Stein (1882–1975), American urban planner, architect, and writer
- Colin Stein (born 1947), Scottish footballer
- Chris Stein (born 1950), American guitarist

== D ==
- Dana Stein (born 1958), American politician
- Daniel Stein (disambiguation), several people
- David Stein (disambiguation), several people
- Dieter Stein (born 1967), German journalist

== E ==
- Eb Stein (baseball)
- REpist Stein (1891–1942), German philosopher, Catholic saint
- Eduardo Stein (born 1945), Guatemalan diplomat and politician
- Elias M. Stein (1931–2018), American mathematician
- Ernst Stein (1891–1945), Austrian Byzantinist
- Erwin Stein (1885–1958), Austrian musician and writer
- Evaleen Stein (1863–1923), American author, limner

== F ==
- Freimut Stein (1924–1986), German figure skater
- Fritz Stein (1879–1961), German theologian, conductor, musicologist and church musician

== G ==
- Garth Stein (born 1964), American author, film producer, playwright, and teacher
- Georg Stein (1909–1980s), German chess master
- Gertrude Stein (1874–1947), American novelist, poet, playwright, and art collector
- Gladys Marie Stein (1900–1989) American author and composer
- Gordon Stein (1941–1996), American author, physiologist, and activist
- Greg Stein (born 1967), American programmer, speaker, and open-source software advocate

== H ==
- Haakon Stein (1940–2025), German fencer
- Heinrich Friedrich Karl vom und zum Stein (1757–1831), Prussian statesman
- Herb Stein (1898–1980), American football player
- Herbert Stein (1916–1999), American economist
- Herman Stein (1915–2007), American composer
- Horst Stein (1928–2008), German conductor

== J ==
- Jason Stein, American college baseball coach
- James Stein (c.1804–1877), Australian pastoralist
- Jake Stein (born 1994), Australian rules footballer
- Jimmy Stein (1907–?), Scottish association footballer
- Jill Stein (born 1950), American politician and presidential candidate
- Josh Stein (born 1966), American politician 76th governor of North Carolina and Attorney General
- Jock Stein (1922–1985), Scottish football manager
- Johann Andreas Stein (1728–1792), German maker of keyboard instruments
- John Stein (disambiguation)
- Joseph Allen Stein (1912–2001), American architect
- Jules C. Stein (1896–1981), American musician, physician, and business leader

== K ==
- Karl Stein (mathematician) (1913–2000), German mathematician
- Kurt vid Stein (1935–2022), Danish cyclist

== L ==
- Laura Stein, Australian judge
- Lena Stein-Schneider (1874–1958) German composer
- Leo Stein (1872–1947), American art critic and brother of Gertrude Stein
- Leon Stein (1910–2002), American composer and music analyst
- Leonid Stein (1934–1973), Soviet chess grandmaster
- Lotte Stein (1894–1982), German actress

== M ==
- Mark Stein, English footballer
- Markus Stein (born 1985), German politician
- Mary Kay Stein, American mathematics educator
- Mathias Stein (born 1970), German politician

== P ==
- Peter Stein (disambiguation)
- Philip Stein (1919–2009), American painter

== R ==
- Rick Stein (born 1947), English chef, restaurateur and television presenter
- Robert Stein (disambiguation), several people

== S ==
- Sam Stein (born 1988), American quarter-professional high-stakes poker player
- Samuel Friedrich Stein (1818–1885), Czech entomologist
- Sandra Stein (born 1986), German politician
- Seth Stein (born 1953), American geophysicist
- Stanley J. Stein (1920–2019), American historian
- Steven "Steinski" Stein, American hip-hop producer

== T ==
- Thore Stein (born 1988), German politician

== U ==
- Udo Stein (born 1983), German politician

== V ==
- Vera Stein (born 1958), German author

== W ==
- William A. Stein (born 1974), American mathematician
- William Howard Stein (1911–1980), American biochemist

== Fictional characters ==
- Adam Stein, the protagonist of the novel Adam Resurrected by Israeli author Yoram Kaniuk and the film with the same name
- Chase Stein, a superhero in the Marvel Comics series Runaways
- Franken Stein, a mad scientist in the manga and anime series Soul Eater
- Franny K. Stein, the titular character of an ongoing children's series by Jim Benton
- Martin Stein, one half of the original incarnation of the DC comics superhero Firestorm
- Philip "Cockeye" Stein, fictional character of the 1952 novel The Hoods and the 1984 movie Once Upon a Time in America

== See also ==
- Stine, a surname and given name
