= List of Baltimore City College alumni =

The following is a list of notable alumni of The Baltimore City College (also known colloquially as City College, City, BCC, or The Castle). Founded in 1839, it is recognized as the third-oldest continuously public high school in the United States.

The school was established after a long civic campaign for higher public education during the early 19th century by an act of the Baltimore City Council in March 1839 and opened the following October in a rented town / rowhouse. Hundreds of influential civic, political, business, commercial, industrial, and cultural leaders have passed through its doors at eight geographic sites in the 185 years since. Many graduates of City College have served as members of the United States Congress (U.S. senators and representatives), state senators and delegates in the General Assembly of Maryland, the Baltimore City Council, the adjacent surrounding separate Baltimore County Council, and federal, state and local circuit judges. Alumni also include award-winning journalists; authors; and leaders in business, commerce, the military, academics, the sciences, and the arts. This list includes three former governors of Maryland, six mayors of Baltimore and county executives, and recipients of the Nobel Prize, the Pulitzer Prize, and the Wolf Prize. Of the seven Maryland recipients of the Congressional Medal of Honor between World War I and World War II, three were graduates of the Baltimore City College. Numerous bridges, highways, buildings, lunar craters, institutions, monuments, and professorships throughout the region, state and nation have been named for B.C.C. "Collegians".

== Arts and entertainment ==
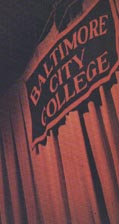

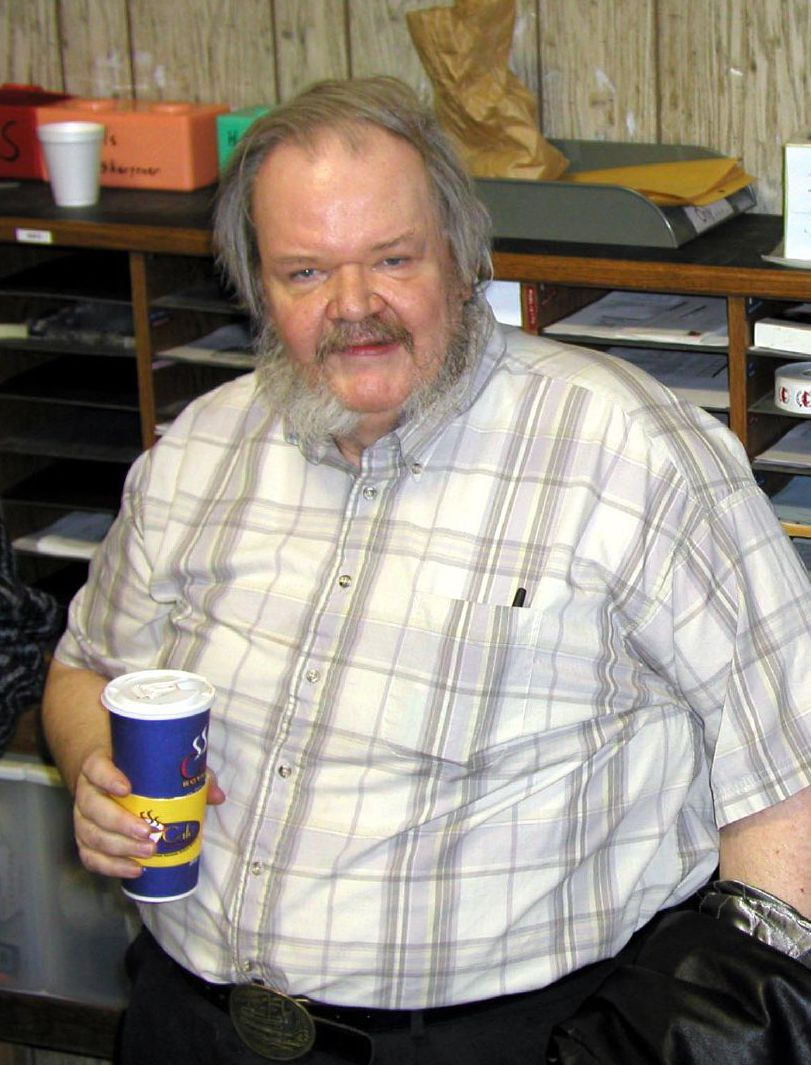
Chalker

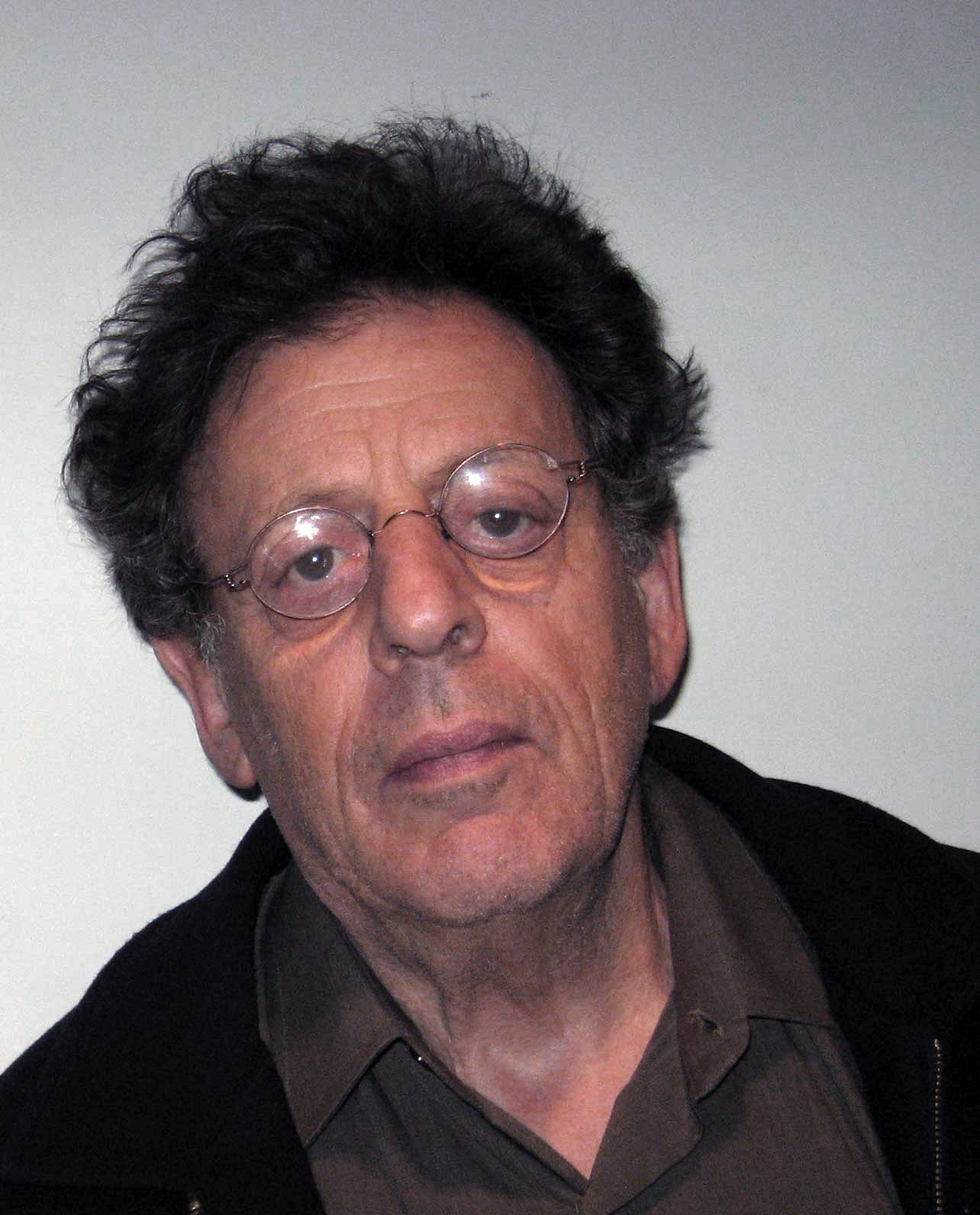
Glass

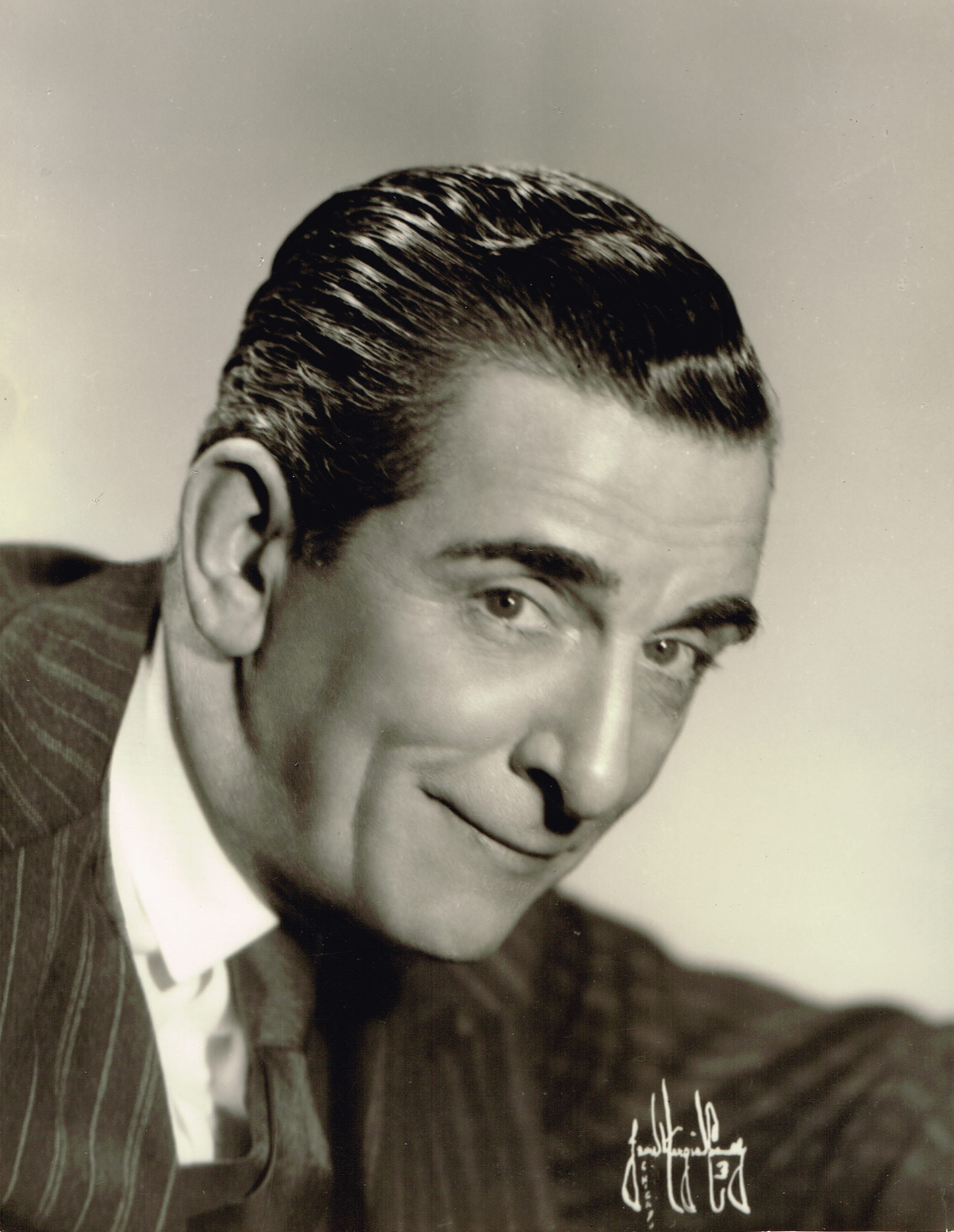
Horton

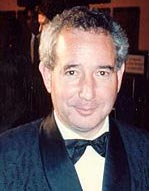
Tucker

Alumni	Class	Reason for notability
Larry Adler	1931	Musician
Russell Baker	1943	Two-time Pulitzer Prize, commentator on the Masterpiece Theatre on (PBS-TV)
Gary Bartz	1958	Jazz musician, Grammy Award winner
Morris Louis Bernstein	1928	Abstract expressionist painter
Jack L. Chalker	1962	Author of over 50 science fiction/fantasy novels
André DeShields	1964	Broadway actor, Tony Award nominee
Philip Glass	1954*	Avant garde composer
Jacob Glushakow	1933	Painter; works are in permanent collections at the Baltimore Museum of Art, The Phillips Collection, and the Metropolitan Museum of Art in New York City
Al Goodman	1918	Musician, conductor
Edward Everett Horton	1904	Character actor and voice narrator in film, television, and stage
Millard Kaufman	1933	Author, screenwriter; helped create the film/television cartoon character of "Mr. Magoo"
Greg Kihn	1967?	Rock musician, radio host
Gene Klavan	1940	Radio talk show host in Washington, D.C. and New York
David Matthews	1984	Author
Garry Moore (T. Garrison Morfit)	1933	Game show host in New York City during the 1950s and 1960s
Royal Parker	1946	News anchor WBAL-TV (Channel 11), local TV variety and game show host, announcer
Robert Pirosh	1928	Writer, won Academy Award ("Oscar") and Golden Globe for screenplay of Battleground
Fred Robbins	1937	Television and radio host
Woody Rock	1993	Singer, member of Dru Hill
Karl Shapiro	1932	Poet; literary critic; professor, Johns Hopkins University; Pulitzer Prize winner
Eli Siegel	1919	Poet and founder of Aesthetic Realism
Michael Tucker	1962	Actor, appeared in 1990s legal television drama L.A. Law and earlier Diner (in 1982, first of a series of feature films about Baltimore life, produced / directed by fellow Baltimorean Barry Levinson)
Leon Uris	1942	Writer, author of Exodus
Charles Marquis Warren	1930	Television and film writer, producer; director; credits include Gunsmoke, Rawhide, The Virginian and Playhouse 90
Hugo Weisgall	1929	Composer
Charles Erskine Scott Wood	1870	Author, civil libertarian, and attorney

== Business ==
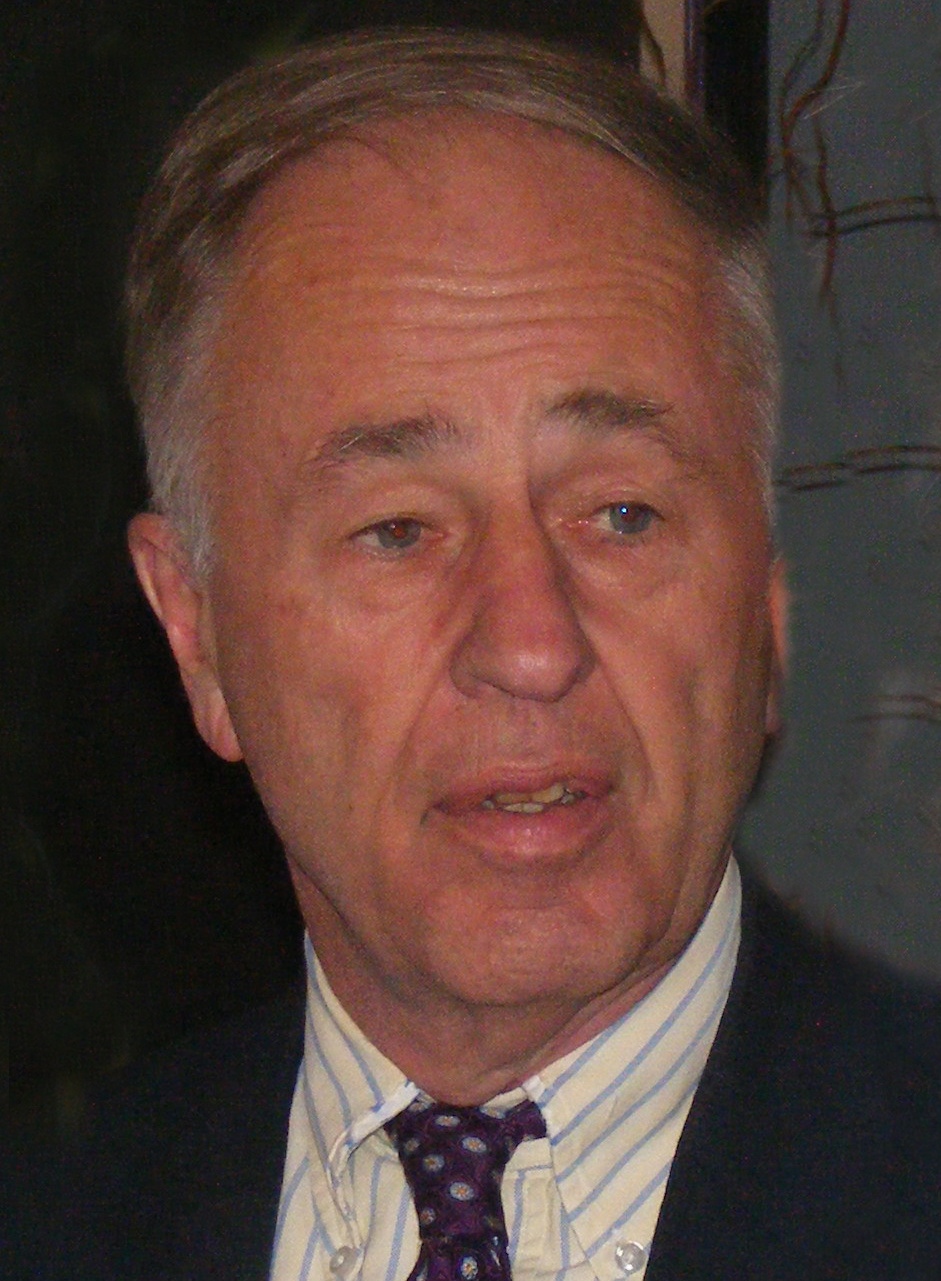
Embry

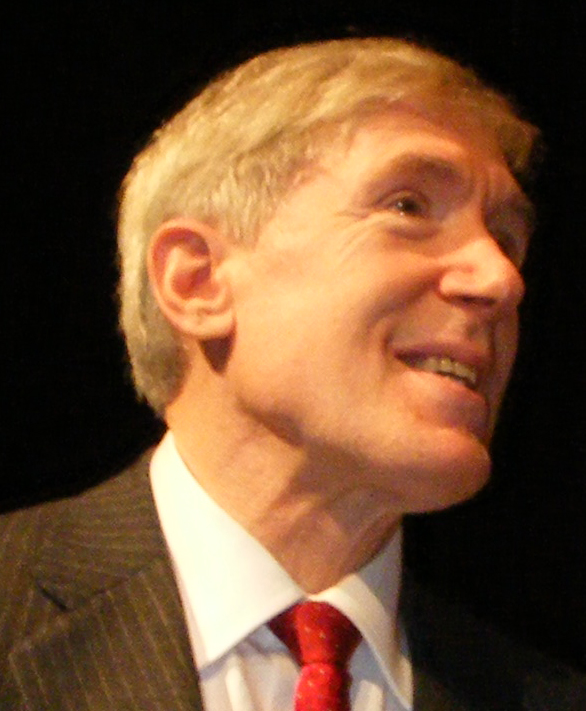
Hormats

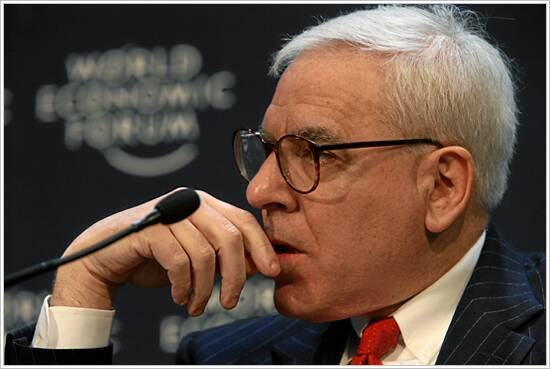
Rubenstein

Alumni	Class	Reason for notability
David T. Abercrombie	1887	Founder of Abercrombie & Fitch
David S. Cordish	1956	President and chairman of the Cordish Company
Robert C. Embry Jr.	1955	President, Abell Foundation
Joseph Haskins Jr.	1967	President and chief executive officer (C.E.O.) of The Harbor Bank of Maryland
Robert D. Hormats	1961	United States Under Secretary of State for Economic, Business, and Agricultural Affairs, Vice Chair of Goldman Sachs financial firm
Zanvyl Krieger	1924	Co-founder of the former Baltimore Colts pro football franchise
Charles P. McCormick	1916	President of McCormick & Company, nationally famous spice and foods manufacturer
Morris A. Mechanic	1915	builder of the Morris A. Mechanic Theatre in Charles Center
Joseph Meyerhoff	1915	Business tycoon, and former longtime president of the Baltimore Symphony Orchestra.
John E. Motz	1930	President, Mercantile Safe Deposit, Bank & Trust Company of Baltimore
Israel Myers	1927	Founder of the Londontown Manufacturing Company
Morton Rapoport	1952	M.D., chief executive officer (C.E.O.), University of Maryland Medical System / University of Maryland Hospital at U.M. at Baltimore
Martin Resnick	1949	Founder, Martins West-Martins Caterers, located off the Baltimore Beltway (Interstate 695), west of the city
Carroll Rosenbloom	1926	Co-founder/owner of the Baltimore Colts
David Rubenstein	1966	Co-founder of The Carlyle Group, an investment capital firm, Arranged new local ownership group to purchase the Baltimore Orioles
Charles Rudo	1937	Owner, Charley Rudo Sports
John Schuerholz	1958	President, Atlanta Braves (Major League Baseball (MLB) in the National League) in Atlanta, Georgia
Henry L. Straus	1913	Electrical engineer and business tycoon
Calvin E. Tyler, Jr.	1960	Philanthropist; Senior Vice President, United Parcel Service (U.P.S,)

== Clergy and education ==
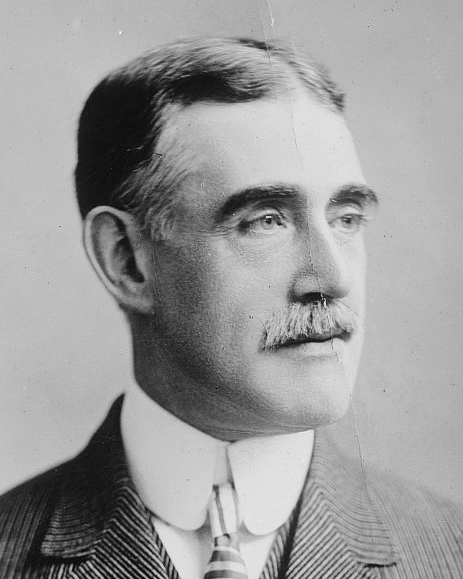
Ford

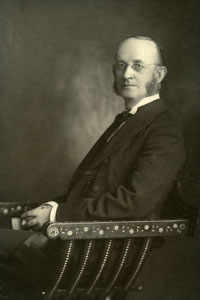
Van Meter

Alumni	Class	Reason for notability
Thomas Sewall Adams	1897	Economist, Yale University; President, American Economic Association (1927)
Neil R. Bernstein	1954	Head of Advertising and Public Relations Drake University School of Journalism
John Richard Bryant	1961	Bishop, Fifth Episcopal District, African Methodist Episcopal Church
Alan M. Chesney	1905	Dean, Johns Hopkins University School of Medicine
Isaac M. Colbert	1964	Dean of Graduate Studies, MIT (1999–present)
John Henry Fischer	1927	President, Teachers College, Columbia University; Superintendent, Baltimore City Public School System, enforced the desegregation of the school system
Henry Jones Ford	1868	Political scientist, Johns Hopkins University, University of Pennsylvania, Princeton University; President, American Political Science Association
Norman Hackerman	1928	Chemist; president, Rice University and the University of Texas at Austin; National Medal of Science; Vannevar Bush Award (1993)
William W. Howell	1878	Dean, Johns Hopkins University School of Medicine (1899–1911)
Arthur Hertzberg	1928	Former President, American Jewish Congress
John H. Latane	1889	Dean of faculty, professor, Johns Hopkins University
Leo Lemay	1953	Biographer of Benjamin Franklin, du Pont Winterthur Professor of English at the University of Delaware
Arthur Maass	1935	Political scientist, Harvard University (1948–1984)
William K. Morrill	1921	Dean of Students, mathematician, Johns Hopkins University; member, Lacrosse Museum and National Hall of Fame
Lindsay Rogers	1908	Burgess Professor of Public Law, Columbia University (1920–1959); director, Social Science Research Council (1934–36), and prolific writer
Kurt Schmoke	1967	President, University of Baltimore, former Dean, Howard University School of Law; 47th Mayor, City of Baltimore
William R. Straughn	1902	Founding President, Mansfield University of Pennsylvania
John B. Van Meter		Methodist minister, educator, and the co-founder of Goucher College
Orris George Walker	1960	First African American Bishop of the Episcopal Church
David E. Weglein	1894	Longest serving superintendent, Baltimore City Public School System 1924–1945
Henry Skinner West	1888	President, Towson University; Superintendent, Baltimore City Public School System

== Government and politics ==
=== Congress ===
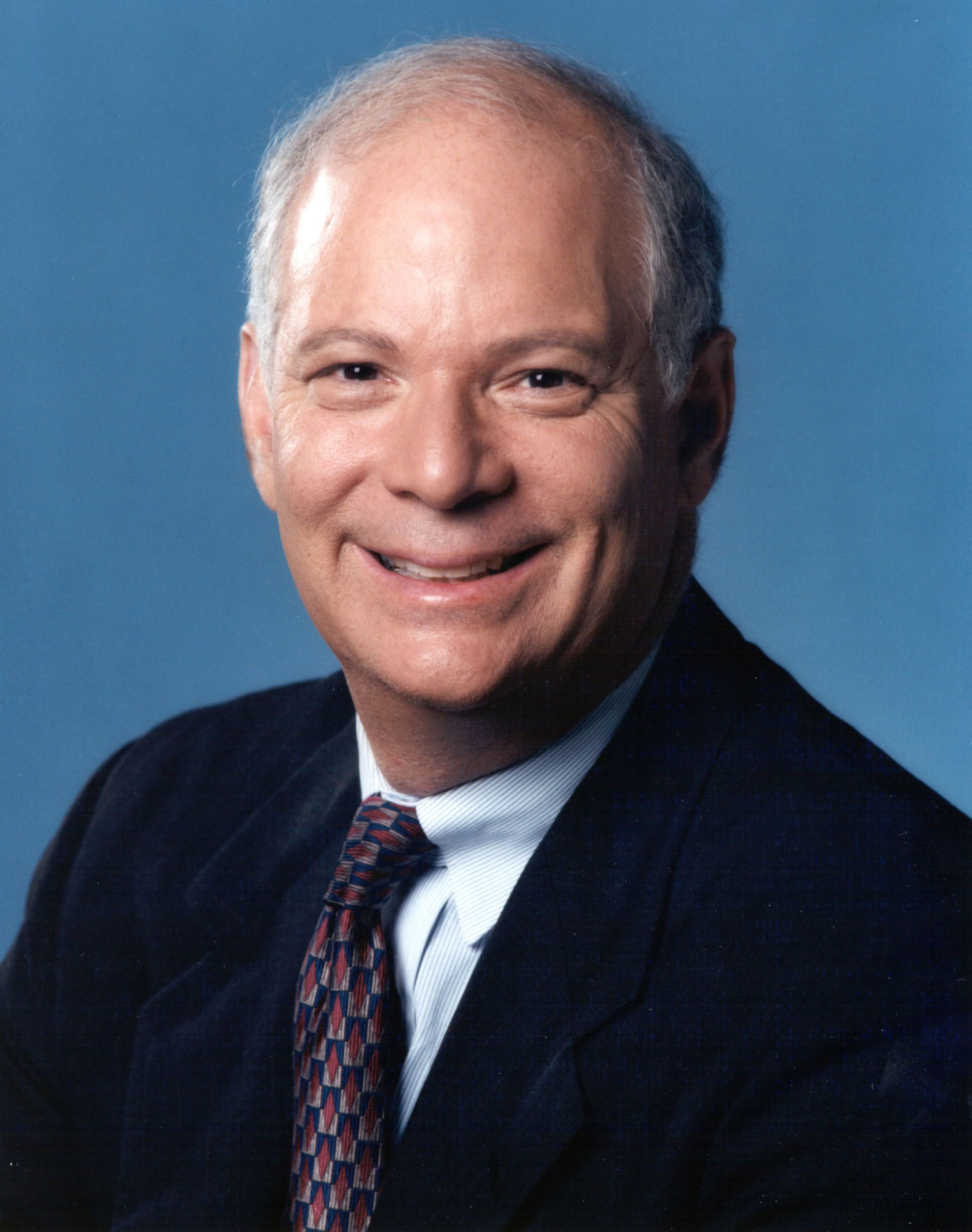
Cardin

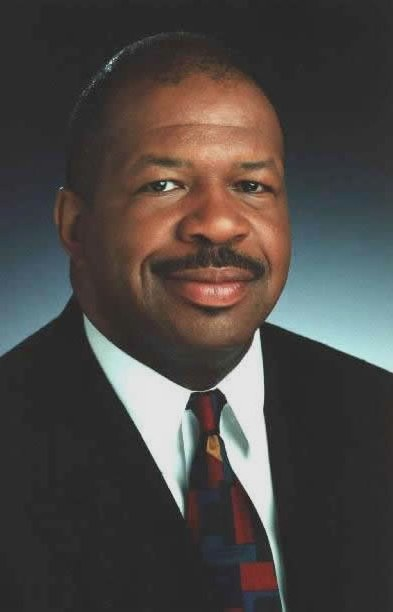
Cummings

Alumni	Class	Reason for notability
William Samuel Booze	1879	U.S. congressman, Maryland's 3rd congressional district (1897–1899)
Benjamin L. Cardin	1960	U.S. senator, Maryland (2007–2025); U.S. congressman, Maryland's 3rd congressional district (1988–2007)
Charles Pearce Coady	1886	U.S. congressman, Maryland's 3rd congressional district (1913–1921)
Elijah Cummings	1969	U.S. congressman, Maryland's 7th congressional district (1996–2019)
Charles A. "Dutch" Ruppersberger	1963	U.S. congressman, Maryland's 2nd congressional district (2003–2025)
Harry Welles Rusk	1866	U.S. congressman, Maryland's 3rd congressional district (1886–1897)
William Stuart Symington, III	1918	U.S. senator, Missouri (1953–1976); 1st United States Secretary of the Air Force (1947–1950)

=== Governors ===
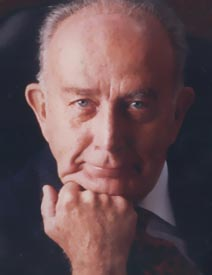
Schaefer

Alumni	Class	Reason for notability
Marvin Mandel	1937	56th governor of Maryland
Harry Nice	1898	50th governor of Maryland
William Donald Schaefer	1939	58th governor of Maryland; 45th mayor of Baltimore; 32nd comptroller of Maryland

=== State legislature ===
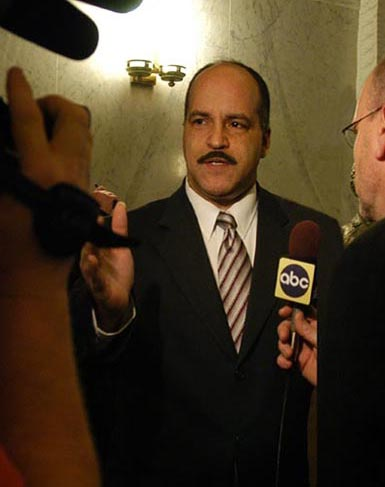
Anderson

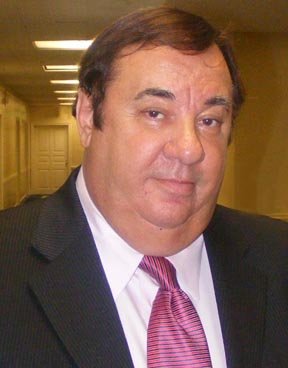
McDonough

Rosenberg

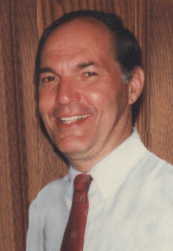
Lapides

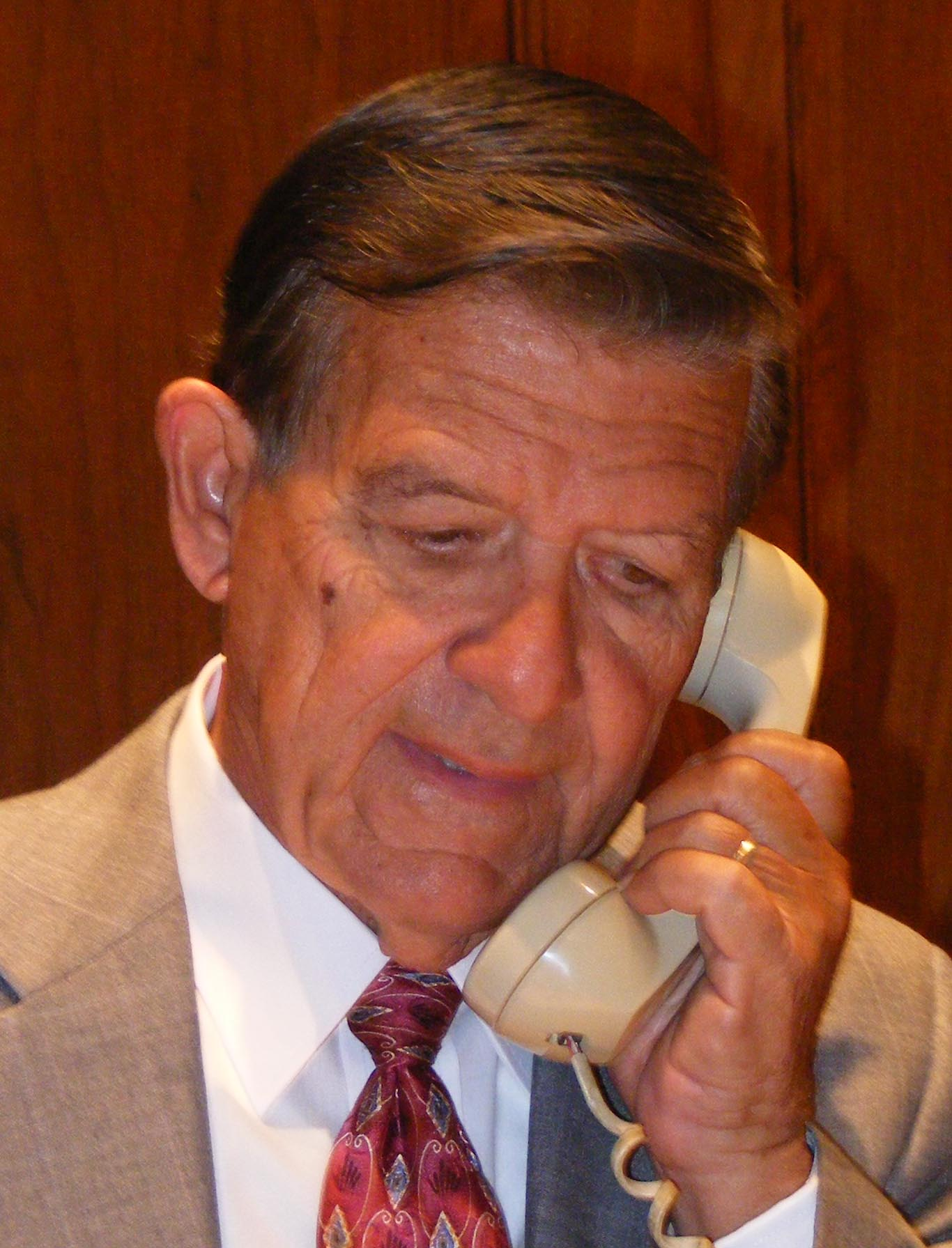
Stone

Alumni	Class	Reason for notability
Curt Anderson	1967	Delegate, District 43, Baltimore (1983–1995, 2003–2023); longest serving chairman of the Baltimore City Delegation (2006–2018)
Charles B. Bosley	1905	Delegate, Baltimore County, 1914
Meyer Cardin	1926	Delegate (1936–38); judge, Baltimore Supreme Bench
John D. C. Duncan Jr.		Delegate, Baltimore County (1920) and state senator, Baltimore County (1935–1937)
Elizabeth Embry	1994	Delegate, District 43A Baltimore (2023–present)
Tony Fulton	1968	Delegate, District 40, Baltimore City (1987–2005)
Ralph M. Hughes	1966	State senator, District 40, Baltimore City (1991–2007); delegate (1983–1991)
Julian L. Lapides	1949	State senator, District 44, Baltimore City (1967–1994)
Pat McDonough	1964	Delegate, District 7 Baltimore County (1979–1983, 2003–present)
Nathaniel J. McFadden	1964	State senator, District 45, Baltimore City (1995–present)
B. Daniel Riley	1964	Delegate, District 34, Harford County (1999–2003, 2007–present)
Samuel I. Rosenberg	1968	Delegate, District 41, Baltimore City (1983–present)
Melvin Steinberg	1950	Lieutenant governor (1986–1994); president of Maryland State Senate (1983–1986); state senator (1967–1986)
Norman R. Stone, Jr.	1953	State senator, District 45, Baltimore County (1966–present)

=== Judiciary ===
Stewart

Alumni	Class	Reason for notability
Thomas S. Baer	1858	Supreme Bench of Baltimore City, judge (1903–1906)
John R. Bartels	1915	United States District Court for the Eastern District of New York, judge (1959–1997)
Robert I. H. Hammerman	1946	Circuit court, Baltimore City, chief judge (1984–1998), judge (1967–1998)
Francis Hall Hammond	1919	Maryland Court of Appeals, chief judge (1966–1971), judge (1952–1966)
Ogle Marbury	1899	Maryland Court of Appeals, chief judge (1944–1952), judge (1941–1944)
Francis D. Murnaghan, Jr.	1937	United States Court of Appeals for the Fourth Circuit, circuit judge (1979–2000)
Reuben Oppenheimer	1917	Maryland Court of Appeals, judge (1964–1967)
Joseph I. Pines	1939	Circuit court, Baltimore City, judge (1980–1992)
William D. Quarles Jr.	1965	United States District Court for the District of Maryland, judge (2003–present)
John Carter Rose	1877 (left to attend University of Maryland)	United States Court of Appeals for the Fourth Circuit, circuit judge (1922–1927) United States District Court for the District of Maryland, judge (1910–1922); U.S. attorney for the District of Maryland (1898–1910)
A. Cecil Snyder	1936	Supreme Court of Puerto Rico, chief justice (1953–1957), associate justice (1942–1953)
Simon Sobeloff	1909	United States Court of Appeals for the Fourth Circuit, chief judge (1958–1964), circuit judge (1956–1958); United States Solicitor General (1954–1956)
Morris Ames Soper	1890	United States Court of Appeals for the Fourth Circuit, circuit judge (1931–1963)
Charles Francis Stein, Sr.	1925	Supreme Bench of Baltimore City, judge (1921–1936)
Robert Dorsey Watkins	1918	United States District Court for the District of Maryland, judge (1955–1986)
Alan M. Wilner	1954	Maryland Court of Appeals, judge (1996–2007); Maryland Court of Special Appeals, chief judge (1990–1996), judge (1977–1990)

=== Federal government ===
Cumming

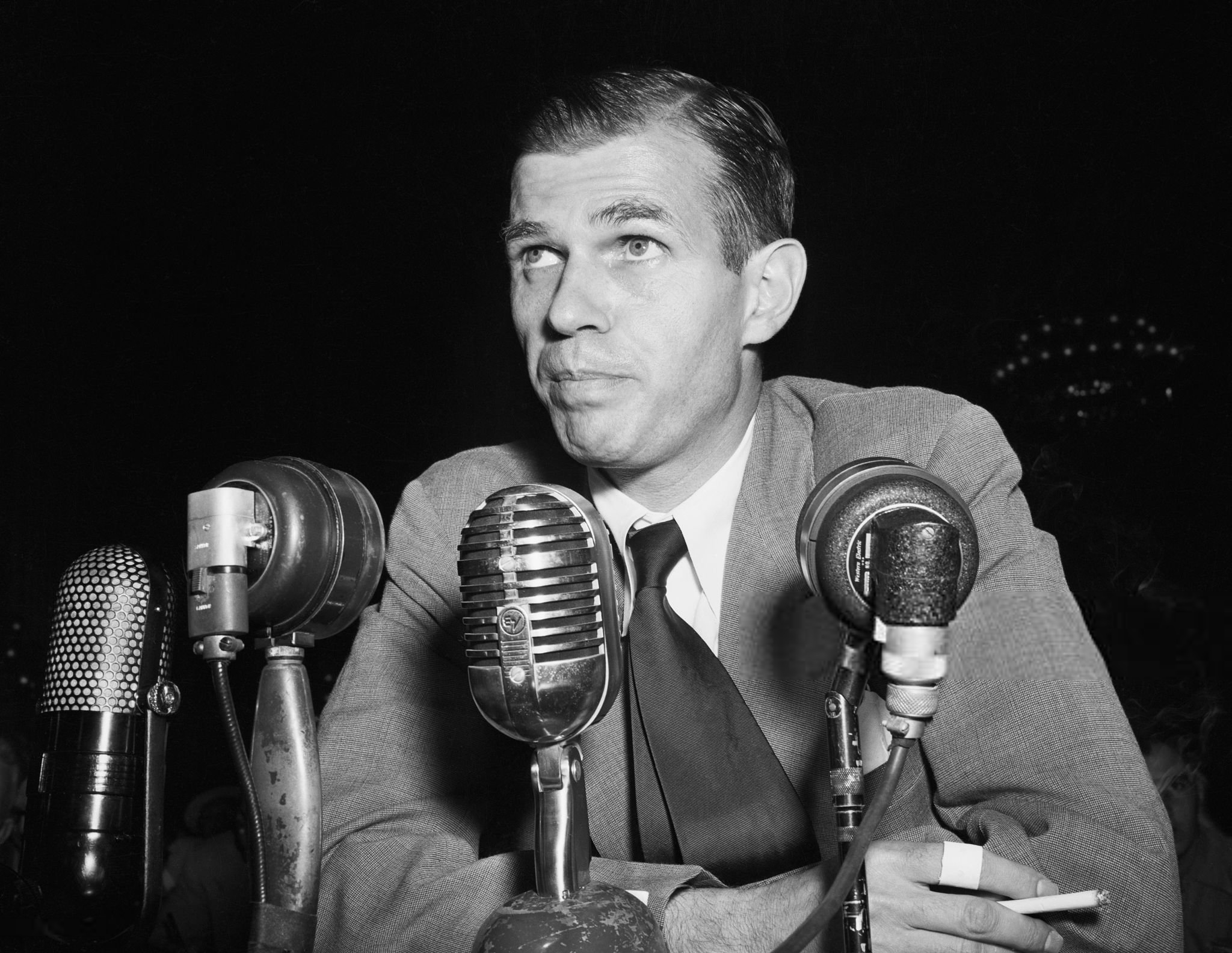
Hiss

Alumni	Class	Reason for notability
Hugh S. Cumming	1886	Surgeon General of the United States (1920–1936)
Alger Hiss	1921	U.S. State Department, alleged Soviet spy
Alvin "Buzzy" Krongard	1954	Former deputy director of the CIA; former vice-chairman of Bankers Trust; former chairman of Alex. Brown & Sons; member of National Lacrosse Hall of Fame
Howard J. Krongard	1957	Inspector general of the Department of State (2005–present)
Alfred H. Moses	1947	U.S. ambassador, Romania
Philip B. Perlman	1908	U.S. solicitor general (1947–1952)

=== State and local officials ===
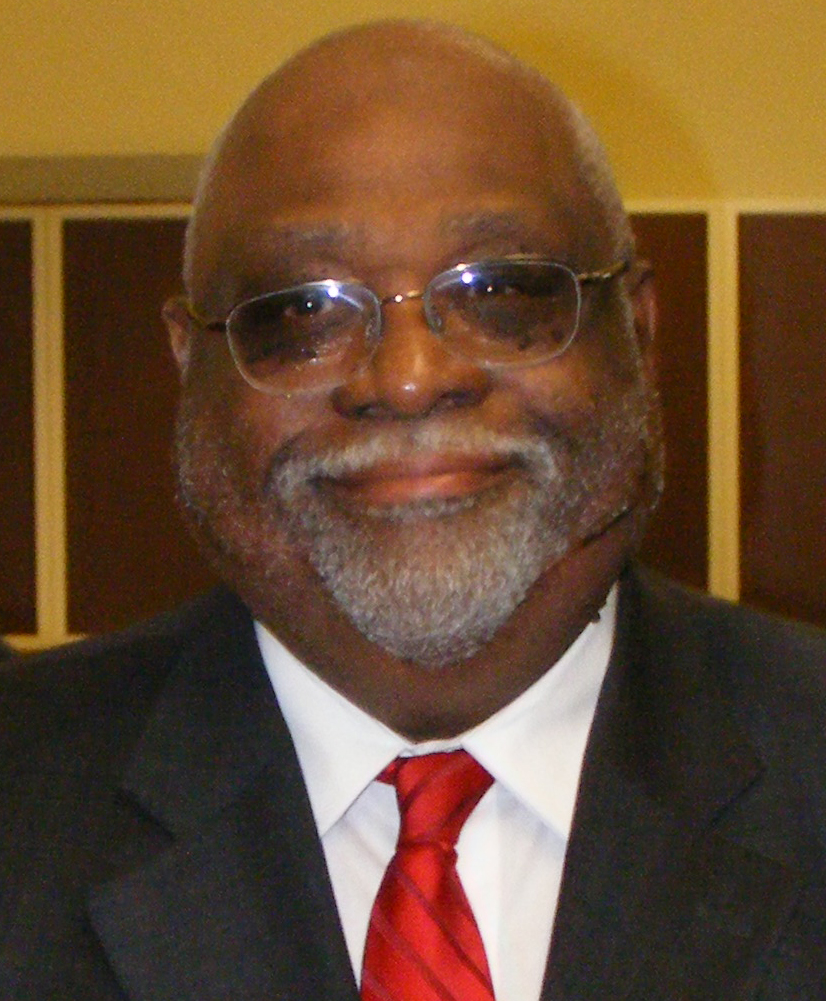
Anderson

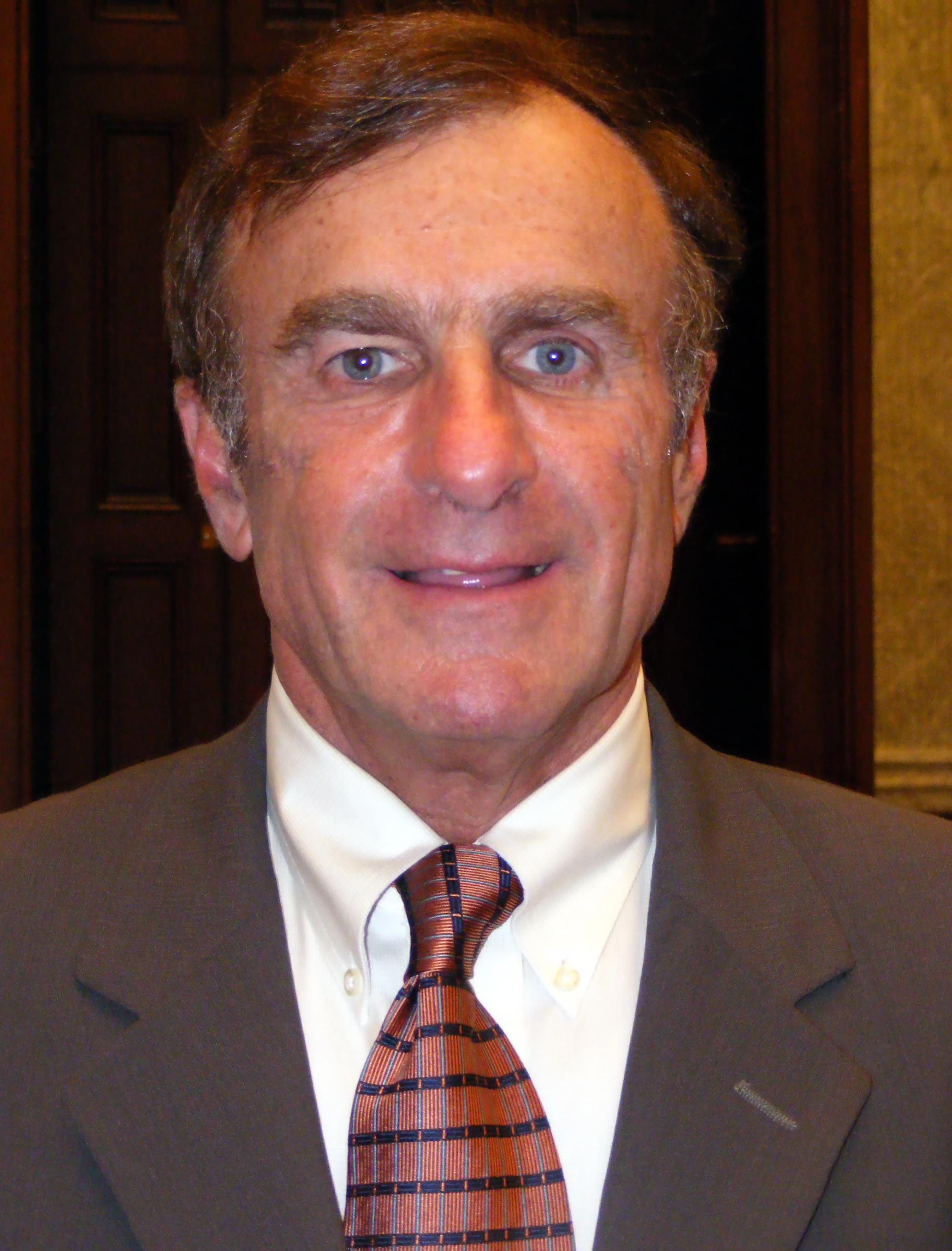
Fine

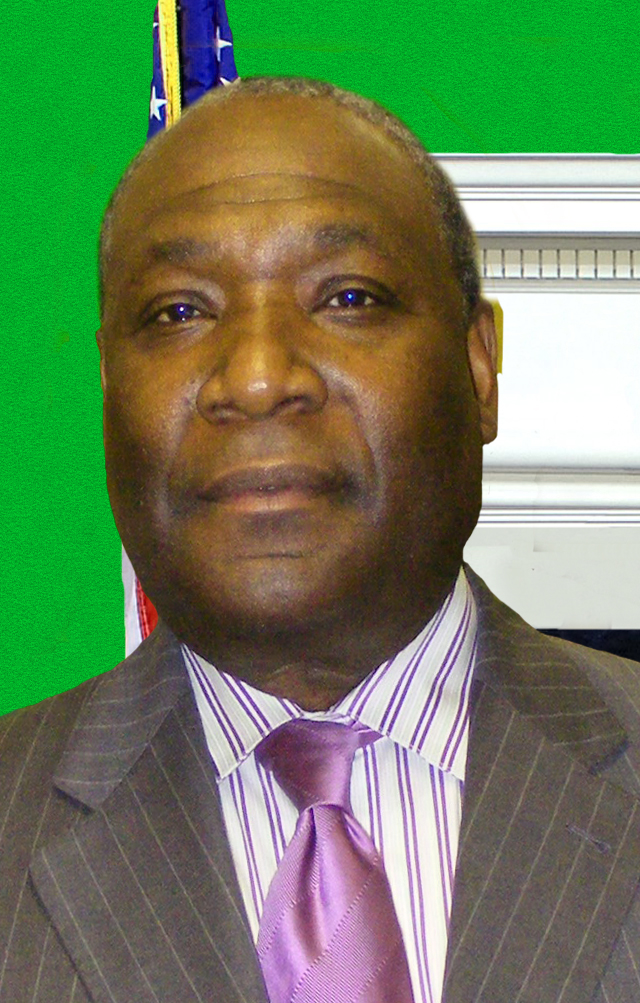
Hamm

Alumni	Class	Reason for notability
Francis B. Burch	1937	Attorney general of Maryland (1966–1974); city solicitor, Baltimore (1961–1963)
Dennis Callahan	1958	Mayor of Annapolis (1985–1989)
Philip H. Goodman	1931	43rd mayor of Baltimore (1962–1963)
Hyman A. Pressman	1933	City Comptroller of Baltimore (1963–1991)
Leonard Hamm	1967	Police commissioner, Baltimore (2005–2007)

Shading appears where relevant
Democratic Party
Republican Party

== Journalism ==
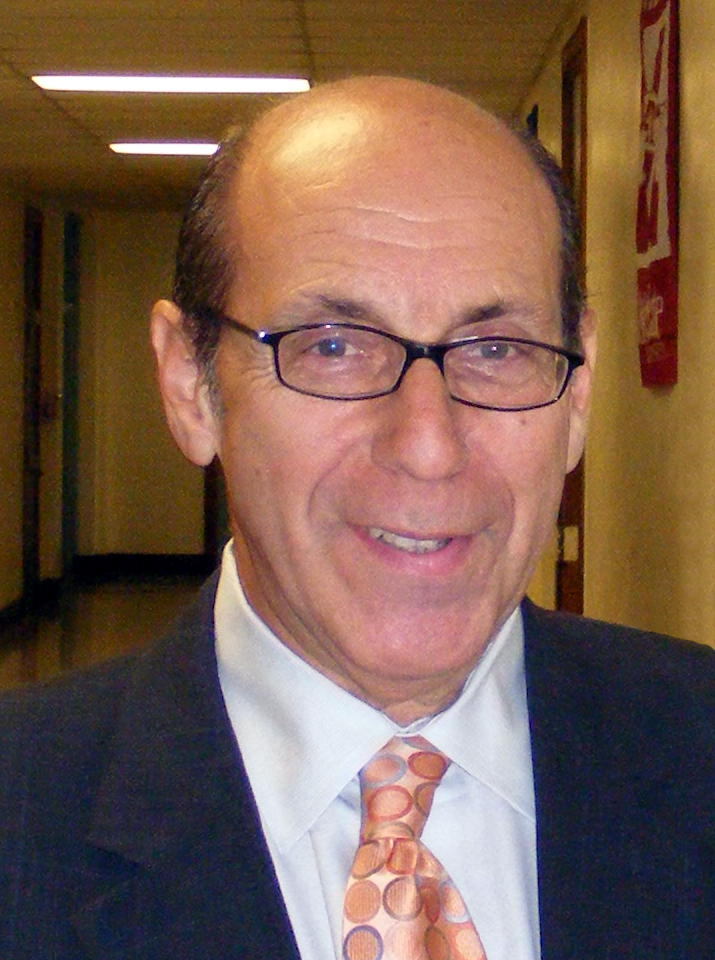
Matz

Alumni	Class	Reason for notability
Gregory Kane	1969	Columnist, Baltimore Sun
Michael Olesker	1963	Former columnist, Baltimore Sun; columnist, The Examiner, author
John Steadman	1945	Sports editor, Baltimore Evening Sun

== Military ==
Memorial plaque for BCC alumni who died in World War I

Alumni	Class	Reason for notability
Jacob Beser	1938	Lt., Army Air Corps, World War II; crew member on the Enola Gay; awarded Silver Star and Distinguished Flying Cross
Frederick C. Billard	1892	Admiral, commandant of the Coast Guard
Henry Gilbert Costin	1916	Pfc., US Army, World War I; Medal of Honor
David H. Huntoon	1969	Lt. General US Army, 58th Superintendent of the United States Military Academy
Isadore S. Jachman	1939	Sgt., US Army, World War II; Medal of Honor, Distinguished Service Cross, Purple Heart, Croix de Guerre
J. William Kime	1951	Admiral, commandant of the Coast Guard
John E. Morrison	1936	Major general, United States Air Force
Milton Ernest Ricketts	1930	Lt., US Navy, World War II; Medal of Honor

== Science ==
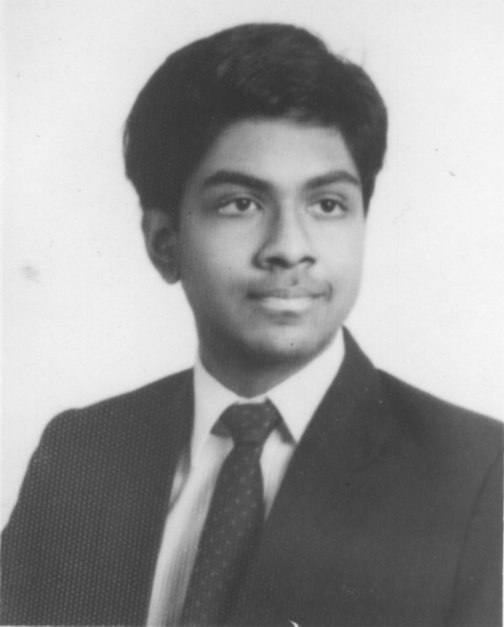
Ambati

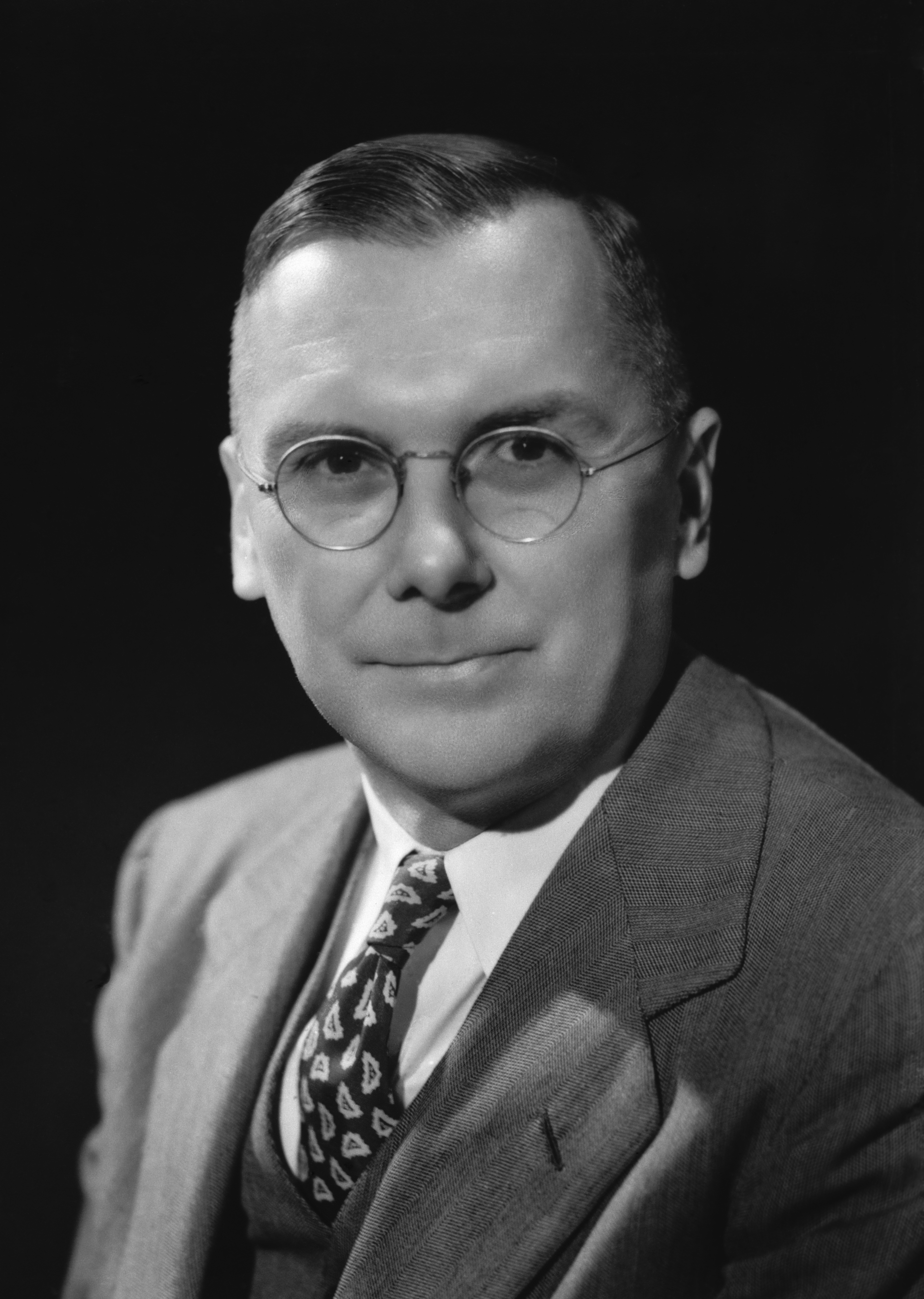
Dryden

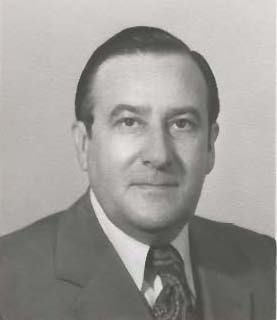
Dunn

Alumni	Class	Reason for notability
Balamurali Ambati	1989	Youngest person to become a doctor
Richard Askey	1951	Mathematician; Askey-Wilson polynomials
Eric Baer	1949	Polymer and plastics researcher
Edgar Berman	1932	Surgeon, first to do heart transplant; physician to Hubert Humphrey
Louis R. Caplan	1954	Neurologist
Hugh Latimer Dryden	1913	National Advisory Committee for Aeronautics, NASA
Wendell E. Dunn, Jr.	1938	Chemical engineer, metallurgist
Solomon W. Golomb	1949	Mathematician, engineer, inventor of polyominoes
Norman L. Hackerman	1928	Chemist, former president, University of Texas, Rice University
William Henry Howell	1878	Physiologist; pioneer of the use of heparin as a blood anticoagulant; dean, Johns Hopkins University School of Medicine
Nicholas Katz	1960	Mathematician; Grothendieck-Katz p-curvature conjecture
Simon A. Levin	1957	Ecologist, Princeton University
Charles C. Plitt	1866	Botanist
Robert Resnick	1939	Physicist; professor, Rensselaer Polytechnic Institute; Oersted Medal (1974)
Martin Rodbell	1943	Biochemist, molecular endocrinologist; Nobel Prize in Physiology or Medicine 1994
Tracy M. Sonneborn	1922	Biologist, geneticist
Victor Strasburger	1967	Pediatrician; medical expert on adolescents
John Archibald Wheeler	1927	Theoretical physicist; Wolf Prize in Physics
Abel Wolman	1909	Sanitary engineer; inventor of modern water treatment techniques

== Sports ==
Varsity sports letter

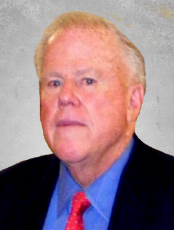
Budnitz

Alumni	Class	Reason for notability
Al Albert	1965	College soccer, head coach, College of William & Mary (1971–2003)
Max Bishop	1921*	Baseball, 2nd baseman, Philadelphia Athletics and Boston Red Sox,
Tommy Byrne	1937	Baseball, pitcher, New York Yankees
Charley Eckman	1940	Basketball, head coach, Fort Wayne/Detroit Pistons (1954–1957)
Thom Gatewood	1968	Football, wide receiver, New York Giants
Malik Hamm	2017	Football, linebacker, Baltimore Ravens
Bryant Johnson	1999	Football, wide receiver, Arizona Cardinals, Detroit Lions
William Kelso Morrill	1926	Lacrosse, member, National Lacrosse Hall of Fame
Johnny Neun	1921	Baseball, manager, New York Yankees and Cincinnati Reds
William C. Schmeisser	1899	Lacrosse, coach, Johns Hopkins University, namesake Schmeisser Award; US Olympian
Charles Tapper	2012	Offensive tackle Dallas Cowboys, New York Jets
Alphonse "Tommy" Thomas	1918	Baseball, pitcher, Chicago White Sox

== Other ==
- F. Pierpont Davis, architect and 1932 Olympics 8 metre gold medalist
- Makayla Gilliam-Price, 2016, social activist
