= Arthur Stein =

Arthur Stein may refer to:

- Arthur Stein (political scientist)
- Arthur Stein (historian)
- Arthur Stein (activist)
