= Charles Stein =

Charles Stein may refer to:

- Charles Stein (athlete) (1911–1981), Luxembourgian Olympic runner
- Charles M. Stein (1920–2016), American statistician
- Charles Francis Stein Sr. (1866–1939), Baltimore city judge
- Charles Ramsay Stirling Stein (1897–1973), Canadian Army officer
- Charles-Adolphe Stein (1878–1938), Quebec politician, lawyer and judge

== See also ==
- Charlie Stein (born 1986), German painter and visual artist
