= Robert Stein =

Robert Stein may refer to:

- Bob Stein (American football) (born 1948), American football linebacker
- Bobby Stein (1938/9–2021), Scottish footballer for Raith Rovers, Montrose, and East Stirlingshire
- Robert Stein (computer pioneer) (born 1946), American computer pioneer and electronic publisher
- Robert Stein (explorer) (1857–1917), Prussian-American Arctic explorer
- Robert Stein Jr., comptroller for the Coalition Provisional Authority in Iraq, convicted of fraud
- Robert Stein, Scottish developer of the "patent still"
- Robert A. Stein (law professor) (born 1939), American law school dean and American Bar Association president
- Robert A. Stein (diplomat) (1919–1998), American diplomat
- Robert F. Stein, American physicist and astronomer, see Timeline of solar astronomy
- Bobby Van (Robert Jack Stein, 1928–1980), American musical actor
- R. L. Stine (Robert Lawrence Stein, born 1943), American author of the horror-fiction genre
- Rob Stein (1943–2022), American political strategist
- Robert M. Stein (1950–2025), American political scientist

== See also ==
- Robert Stein Wines, New South Wales, Australia
- Stein (surname)
- Robert Steiner (disambiguation)
