= David Stein =

David Stein may refer to:

- David Ezra Stein, American children's book author and illustrator
- David Stein (art forger) (1935–1999)
- David Stein (radio host), American radio host of The David Stein Show since 2006
- David Stein, American CIA analyst who in 1998 solved the first three parts of the Kryptos sculpture
- David Stein, a.k.a. David Cole (journalist), Holocaust denier who changed his name
