= Daniel Stern =

Daniel Stern may refer to:

- Daniel Stern (actor) (born 1957), American actor
- Daniel Stern (psychologist) (1934–2012), psychoanalytic theorist and author
- Daniel Stern (writer) (1928–2007), Jewish American novelist and professor of English
- Marie d'Agoult (1805–1876), pen name Daniel Stern, French romantic author and historian
- Ina Lange (1846—1930), pen name Daniel Stern, Finnish pianist, music historian and author

== See also ==
- Daniel Stein (disambiguation)
