= Robert Steiner =

Robert Steiner may refer to:

- Robert Steiner (footballer) (born 1973), Swedish professional footballer
- Robert Steiner (radiologist) (1918–2013), British radiologist
- Robert Steiner (writer) (born 1976), German mountain climber and writer
- Rob Steiner (born 1944), Canadian tap dancer of The Steiner Brothers
- Bob Steiner (1946–2020), Canadian football player

== See also ==
- Robert Stein (disambiguation)
