= Joseph I. Pines =

American judge

Honorable Joseph I. Pines

Associate Judge, Baltimore City Circuit Court
- In office 1980–1992
- Appointed by: Harry R. Hughes

Personal details
- Born: February 16, 1922 New York, New York
- Died: April 16, 2009 (aged 87) Pikesville, Maryland
- Spouse: Marcia G. Pines
- Children: David and Ellen
- Education: Johns Hopkins University, University of Baltimore

Joseph I. Pines (1922-2009) was an American lawyer and Judge on the Supreme Bench of Baltimore City (later renamed the Circuit Court for Baltimore).

== Background ==
Pines, the son of a grocer, was born Joseph I. Pinas in New York City. In 1925, his father moved the family to Baltimore where they settled on East Biddle Street. His father established a grocery store on Orleans Street and later moved to Liberty Heights Avenue in Northwest Baltimore, when he opened a store. Pines was a 1939 graduate of Baltimore City College. He earned his law degree from the University of Baltimore in 1942, 5 years later he changed his name to Joseph I Pines. Pines was admitted to Maryland Bar in 1943 and was a member, American, Maryland State and Baltimore City Bar Associations. He was also a member of the American Trial Lawyers Association.

== Judicial career ==
Pines was appointed to Supreme Bench of Baltimore City, January 28, 1980 and retired from the Baltimore City Circuit Court, February 19, 1992. He continued to hear cases as a visiting judge through 2001. Pines is described as having a very even-tempered demeanor and was always very fair by Judge Joseph H. H. Kaplan who also said of Pines "I was the administrative judge for a lot of the years he was on the bench, and I never heard one complaint about his mistreating someone." In June 1986, a Baltimore jury convicted Flint Gregory Hunt of first degree murder, and he was sentenced to death by Judge Pines the following month. Pines was a member of the Maryland Judicial Conference and part of the Conference's executive committee.

== Death ==
On April 16, 2009, Judge Pines died at the age of 87, just four days after his wife Marcia died. Interment was at the Beth Tfiloh Cemetery.
