= Victor C. Strasburger =

American pediatrician and author

Victor C. Strasburger is an American pediatrician, author, and academic. He is the distinguished professor of pediatrics emeritus and the founding chief of the Division of Adolescent Medicine at the University of New Mexico School of Medicine.

== Early life and education ==
Strasburger graduated from the Baltimore City College in Baltimore, Maryland in 1967. He attended Yale University where he studied fiction writing with Robert Penn Warren and graduated summa cum laude and Phi Beta Kappa.

Then, he attended Harvard Medical School. His first novel, Rounding Third & Heading Home, was published in 1974 when he was a senior in medical school.

== Career ==
After graduating from Harvard Medical, he trained at the Children's Hospital in Seattle and St. Mary's Hospital Medical School in London. He completed a residency in pediatrics at the Boston Children's Hospital from 1975 to 1978. He had an internship at the University of Washington School of Medicine from 1975 to 1976.

In 1987, Strasburger joined the faculty of the University of New Mexico Department of Pediatrics. He is the distinguished professor of pediatrics emeritus and the founding chief of the Division of Adolescent Medicine at the University of New Mexico School of Medicine.

In 2006, he received the Society for Adolescent Medicine's visiting professorship and lectured at the Sydney Children's Hospital in Australia. In 2010, he was a visiting professor at the University of Otago Dunedin School of Medicine in New Zealand. In 2012, Strasburger was named a distinguished professor at the University of New Mexico, the highest honor the University bestows on its faculty. He was awarded a Fulbright Fellowship in 2013.

He has authored fourteen books and nearly 200 chapters and articles in the pediatric literature. He is the author of Adolescent Medicine: A Practical Guide, published in 1998; the latest edition of the textbook was published in 2006. He also wrote Adolescents and The Media: Medical and Psychological Impact (1995), Children, Adolescents, and the Media (2009), and The Death of Childhood (2018).

He is a member of the American Academy of Pediatrics and has co-authored many of their position statements regarding children, adolescents, and the media. He has appeared on Oprah, The Today Show, CBS This Morning, and NPR and has been featured several times in Newsweek.

== Awards ==
In 2000, Strasburger received the Adele Delenbaugh Hofmann Award from the American Academy of Pediatrics, for outstanding lifetime achievement in adolescent medicine. He was also the first recipient of the Holroyd-Sherry Award, given by the American Academy of Pediatrics for media advocacy work.

== Selected publications ==
=== Novel ===
- Rounding Third & Heading Home. St. Martin's Press, 1974.

=== Nonfiction ===
- Basic Adolescent Gynecology: An Office Guide. Baltimore: Urban & Schwarzenberg, 1990. ISBN 9780806740010
- Adolescents and The Media: Medical and Psychological Impact. Thousand Oaks, CA: Sage, 1995. ISBN 0803955006
- Adolescent Medicine: A Practical Guide, 2nd edition, 1998, Lippincott-Williams & Wilkins.1998. ISBN 0316818755
- Children Adolescents, and the Media. 2nd edition. with Barbara J. Wilson and Amy B. Jordan. Thousand Oaks, CA: Sage, 2009. ISBN 9781412944670
- The Death of Childhood: Reinventing the Joy of Growing Up. St. Martin's Press, 2019. ISBN 1-5275-3084-1

=== Articles ===
- Strasburger, V. C. and Jordan, Amy B., and Donnerstein E. "Health Effects of Media on Children and Adolescents." Pediatrics vol. 125 (2010): 756-767.
- Strasburger, V. C. and Robinson, T. and AAP Council on Communications and Media. "Policy statement: Children, Obesity, and the Media". Pediatrics, vol. 128, no. 7 (2011): 201-208.
- Strasburger, V. C and Hogan, M. and Council on Communications and Media. "Policy statement: Children, Adolescents, and the Media". Pediatrics, vol. 132 (2013): 1-4.
- Strasburger, V. C. "Media Matter: But 'Old' Media May Matter More than "New" Media". Adolescent Medicine: State of the Art Reviews, vol. 25 (2014): 643-669.
- Strasburger. V. C. and Donnerstein E. and Bushman B.J. " Why Don’t People Believe that Media Affect Children and Adolescents?". Pediatrics vol. 133, no. 4 (2-14): 571-574.
- Strasburger, V. C. "Should Babies Be Viewing Screens? The Answer is Surprisingly Complicated". Acta Paediatrica. vol. 104 (2015): 967-968.
- Strasburger, V. C "The Death of Childhood". The Psychoanalytic Study of the Child, 2017.
- Hogan, M. J. and Strasburger, V. C. "Eating Disorders and the Media". Adolescent Medicine: State of the Art Reviews, 2018.
