= Vera Stein =

German writer

- Born: La Paz, Bolivia
- Occupation: author

Vera Stein (born 1958 as Waltraud Storck) is a German author who was held in psychiatric institutions against her will for years due to misdiagnosis.

== Life ==
Vera Stein was held in psychiatric institutions (Frankfurt University Hospital, Dr Heines Clinic in Bremen) for years from 1974 without a sufficient diagnosis and against her will and treated with psychotropic drugs under conditions of puberty. The family, and in particular the father, were the driving force behind the many inpatient compulsory hospitalizations between 1974 and 1979, even after the patient had reached the age of majority and made several escape attempts.

In 1993 she wrote her first book about her psychiatric experiences under the pseudonym Vera Stein, four more followed.

My case shows what can happen to people who have been deprived of what is most valuable, namely their health, and what additional burdens they have to defend themselves against to lead a reasonably decent life despite their damage.

In 2005 she was successful with an application to the European Court of Human Rights in Strasbourg. The Court found a violation of Article 5 (1) (right to liberty and security) and Article 8 (right to respect for private and family life) of the European Convention on Human Rights with regard to her stay in the private Dr. Heines Clinic from July 29, 1977, to April 5, 1979, for which the Federal Republic of Germany was responsible. At the instigation of her father, she had been placed in a closed ward of the clinic against her will and without a court order, and had been returned there by the police after escaping on March 4, 1979; the rejection of her claims for damages against the clinic in this regard by the judiciary had not taken sufficient account of Article 5 and had thus also violated it. The Federal Republic of Germany was ordered to pay 75,000 euros in damages.

== Works ==
- Mit dem Rücken zur Wand. Ein Ratgeber – So setze ich mein Recht im Arzthaftungsprozess durch! VAS Verlag für Akademische Schriften, Frankfurt am Main 2012, ISBN 978-3-88864-479-5
- Diagnose „unzurechnungsfähig". VAS Verlag für Akademische Schriften, Frankfurt am Main 2006, ISBN 978-3-88864-408-5
- Trotzdem. Behindert ist man nicht – behindert wird man. Schardt Verlag, Oldenburg 2006, ISBN 978-3-89841-237-7
- Menschenfalle Psychiatrie: mit 14 Jahren weggesperrt – der mutige Neustart einer von Ärzten als ‚irrsinnig‘ abgestempelten Frau. Karl F. Haug Verlag, Heidelberg 2000, ISBN 3-8304-2030-7
- Abwesenheitswelten: meine Wege durch die Psychiatrie. 3. Auflage. Narr Francke Attempto Verlag, Tübingen 2005, ISBN 978-3-89308-380-0, zuerst erschienen 1996
