= Peter Stein =

Peter Stein may refer to:

- Peter Stein (legal scholar) (1926–2016), British legal scholar
- Peter Stein (director) (born 1937), German theatre and opera director
- Peter Stein (cinematographer) (born 1943), American cinematographer
- Peter Stein (politician) (born 1968), German politician
