= Louis R. Caplan =

American medical researcher

- Born: December 31, 1936 (age 89); Baltimore, Maryland, United States
- Education: Williams College; University of Maryland School of Medicine
- Years active: 1962-
- Known for: Stroke research
- Medical career
- Profession: Neurologist, Author
- Institutions: Beth Israel Deaconess Medical Center; New England Medical Center; University of Chicago
- Sub-specialties: Stroke
- Research: Neurology

Louis R. Caplan (born December 31, 1936) is an American physician who is a senior member of the Division of Cerebrovascular Disease at Beth Israel Deaconess Medical Center, Boston. He is a Professor of Neurology at Harvard Medical School, Boston, and the founder of the Harvard Stroke Registry at Beth Israel Deaconess Medical Center. Caplan is the author or editor of 51 books and more than 700 articles in medical journals.

== Background ==
Caplan was born in Baltimore, Maryland on December 31, 1936. His father worked in a drugstore and neither of his parents went to college. Caplan graduated from the A course at Baltimore City College High School and then attended Williams College in Williamstown, Massachusetts. There he was elected as a college junior to Phi Beta Kappa and graduated cum laude in 1958. Although a pre-med student, he majored in history and was the recipient of the Williams College history prize. Caplan then attended the University of Maryland School of Medicine and graduated summa cum laude in 1962 and was the valedictorian of his class. He lives in Brookline, Massachusetts with his wife Brenda, whom he has been married to for more than 60 years. They have 6 children, 18 grandchildren, and 14 great-grandchildren.

== Career ==
Caplan is a senior member of the Division of Cerebrovascular Disease at Beth Israel Deaconess Medical Center, Boston. He is a member of many professional societies, serving as an officer on committees for the American Heart Association, the American Academy of Neurology, and the American Neurological Association. He has served as the Chair of both the Boston Society of Neurology and the Chicago Neurological Society. He has mentored more than 75 fellows, including many international.

== Books ==
- Stroke (American Academy of Neurology), by Louis R. Caplan, October 1, 2005
- Striking Back at Stroke: A Doctor-Patient Journal, by Cleo Hutton and M.D., Louis R. Caplan, May 1, 2003
- Stroke Syndromes, by Julien Bogousslavsky and Louis R. Caplan
- Stroke: A Clinical Approach, by Louis R. Caplan, March 1993
- Brain Embolism (Neurological Disease and Therapy), by Louis R. Caplan and Warren J. Manning, July 11, 2006
- Cerebrovascular Disease, by H. Hunt Batjer, Louis R. Caplan, Lars Friberg, and Ralph G., Jr. Greenlee January, 1997
- American Heart Association: Family Guide to Stroke, Treatment, Recovery, and Prevention, by Louis R. Caplan, Mark L. Dyken, and Donald Easton Paperback, 1994
- Primer on Cerebrovascular Diseases, by M.A. Welch, Louis R. Caplan, Donald J. Reis, and Bo K. Siesjo, April 25, 1997
- Brain-Stem Localization and Function, by Louis R. Caplan, H. Ch Hopf, R. Besser, and Gunter Kramer, October 1993
- Cerebral Small Artery Disease (Advances in Neurology), by Patrick M. Pullicino, Louis R. Caplan, and Marc Hommel, July 1993
- Cerebrovascular Diseases: Nineteenth Princeton Stroke Conference (Princeton Research Conference on Cerebrovascular Diseases//Cerebrovascular Diseases, by Princeton Stroke Conference, Michael A. Moskowitz, and Louis R. Caplan
