= David Stein (radio host) =

American radio show host and DJ

- Born: United States
- Occupation: Radio show host

David Stein is an American radio show host and DJ. He is the host of The David Stein Show (nicknamed "A Celebration of Life Through Sports", a show he has hosted in some capacity since 2006. The show focuses on "paying it forward", random acts of kindness and encourages its listeners to "get off the bench and onto the court" with inspirational stories from the world of sports and from other callers. Stein begins each call by asking, "What is good in your life?". After a nine-month hiatus, The David Stein Show has re-emerged as a daily podcast, beginning February 20, 2012.

Staples of Stein's show include encouraging listeners to perform a weekly "Random Act of Kindness", "Pep Talk Friday" and the "Pep Talk Hall of Fame", where Stein plays pep talks given mostly by sports coaches.

Stein proudly cheers for and frequently talks about the Clemson Tigers. In 2010, Stein began hosting the Tiger Tailgate Show, a pregame radio show that can be heard on Clemson football gamedays. Stein also serves as a weekend DJ for The Joy 93.3 FM in Atlanta. David Stein and his wife now co-host a daily morning show about marriage on Christian radio station Victory 91.5 in Atlanta. The name of the show is "Rise and Stein", and it's focused on marriage, family, and Christian faith.

Stein, who grew up in Philadelphia, spent 5 years on Sporting News Radio from 2006-April 1, 2011 hosting the overnight show titled: "A Celebration of Life Through Sports." Before that, Stein was a morning show host at Fox Sports Radio. Many sports talk radio fans complained about a lack of sports talk, callers that insisted on talking about sports were rudely cut off, or hung up on. This eventually led to his eventual departure from Sporting News Radio.

On April 4, 2011, Stein began a new show which focused on general talk with a positive outlook. The show ended on May 26, 2011; Stein cited a loss of financial backing for the program and reported he was looking into other options to continue the show, including finding new sponsors and a possible move to the podcasting format.
