= Charlie Stein =

German painter

Charlie Stein (born 1986) is a German painter and visual artist known for their contributions to the field of visual arts. Stein served as a Guest Professor at HfBK Hamburg

== Biography ==
Charlie Stein's early life and education are not extensively documented. Born in 1986, she began her artistic career in 2007 at the Academy of Fine Arts in Munich in the class of Gerhard Merz. In 2008 she enrolled at the University of Stuttgart where she studied social science and political science, as well as English literature and linguistics. In 2009, she enrolled at the Academy of Fine Arts in Stuttgart to study with Rainer Ganahl. During her studies, Stein spent semesters abroad in Beijing, Abu Dhabi, and Shanghai. In 2014, Stein graduated with a diploma in sculpture from the State Academy of Fine Arts Stuttgart and returned in 2016 to complete her graduate studies in visual arts as a Meisterschüler of Christian Jankowski at the renowned Weissenhof programme of Fine Arts.

== Painting and technology ==
Stein is noted for her innovative approach to incorporating contemporary media into her artistic practice, especially for her exploration of the intersection of painting and technology, utilizing mediums such as filter technology, blockchain, artificial intelligence, and social media. Through these mediums, Stein engages with the evolving landscape of digital culture, challenging traditional notions of art-making and distribution.

== Career ==
Stein has participated in more than 100 exhibitions, including solo and group shows, across various galleries and institutions worldwide. Her artistic practice spans a variety of mediums, including painting, drawing, and installation art.
