= Daniel Stein =

Daniel Stein may refer to:

- Daniel Stein (mime) (born 1952), American modern mime performer
- Daniel Stein (water polo) (born 1983), water polo player from Canada
- Daniel L. Stein (born 1953), American professor of physics and mathematics
- Dan Stein (attorney) (born 1955), president of the Federation for American Immigration Reform
- Dan J. Stein, professor of psychiatry
- DJ Fresh (Daniel Stein, born 1977), drum and bass artist
- Daniel Stein (rabbi) (born 1976), Rosh Yeshiva Yeshiva University and Rav of the Ridniker Shteibel

== See also ==
- Daniel Stern (disambiguation)
