= William Kelso Morrill =

Biographical details
- Born: December 13, 1903; Baltimore, Maryland
- Died: April 11, 1968 (aged 64); Baltimore, Maryland

Playing career
- 1925–1927: Johns Hopkins

Coaching career (HC unless noted)
- 1935–1950: Johns Hopkins

Head coaching record
- Overall: 68–31–1

Accomplishments and honors

Championships
- 1941, 1950

William Kelso Morrill Sr. (December 13, 1903 – April 11, 1968) was a college lacrosse player and coach. He served as the head lacrosse coach at his alma mater, Johns Hopkins University from 1935 to 1950, where he won two Wingate Memorial trophies representing the National lacrosse title. Morrill also served as an executive and head of official for the United States Intercollegiate Lacrosse Association. He was inducted into the National Lacrosse Hall of Fame in 1978. He was "one of the finest early innovators of the college game".

== Biography ==
Kelso Morrill was born on December 13, 1903, in Baltimore, Maryland, where he attended Baltimore City College. He went on to college at Johns Hopkins University where he starred in lacrosse from 1925 to 1927 and his teams won two national titles.

He married Mary Clare Kirk in 1934, and they had two children: William Kelso Morrill, Jr. and Jean Elizabeth Morrill.

In 1935 he became the Johns Hopkins Blue Jays men's lacrosse coach. His 1941 team went 12 and 0, won the USILA National title, outscored their opponents 151 to 19, and pitched 5 shutouts.

After his coaching tenure at Hopkins, Morrill remained active in the sport of lacrosse serving in an various administrative and rule-setting capacities.

He died on April 11, 1968.

== Legacy ==
Additional information needed The William Kelso Morrill Award for Excellence in Mathematics was established at Hopkins in 1995 in his honor. Morrill's son, William K. Morrill Jr. followed in his father's footsteps both as a star player at Johns Hopkins and as a National Lacrosse Hall of Fame inductee, graduated as Hopkins' all-time leading goal scorer and point scorer. Bill's son Mike (1988) also made the All-America team, and was a member of the 1990 and 1994 U.S. national teams. The National Lacrosse Hall of Fame inducted Morrill in 1978. Morrill's son, William K. Morrill Jr. followed in his father's footsteps both as a star player at Johns Hopkins and as a National Lacrosse Hall of Fame inductee, graduated as Hopkins' all-time leading goal scorer and point scorer. Bill's son Mike (1988) also made the All-America team, and was a member of the 1990 and 1994 U.S. national teams.

== See also ==
- Wingate Memorial Trophy
