= Charles Francis Stein Sr. =

American judge (1866–1939)

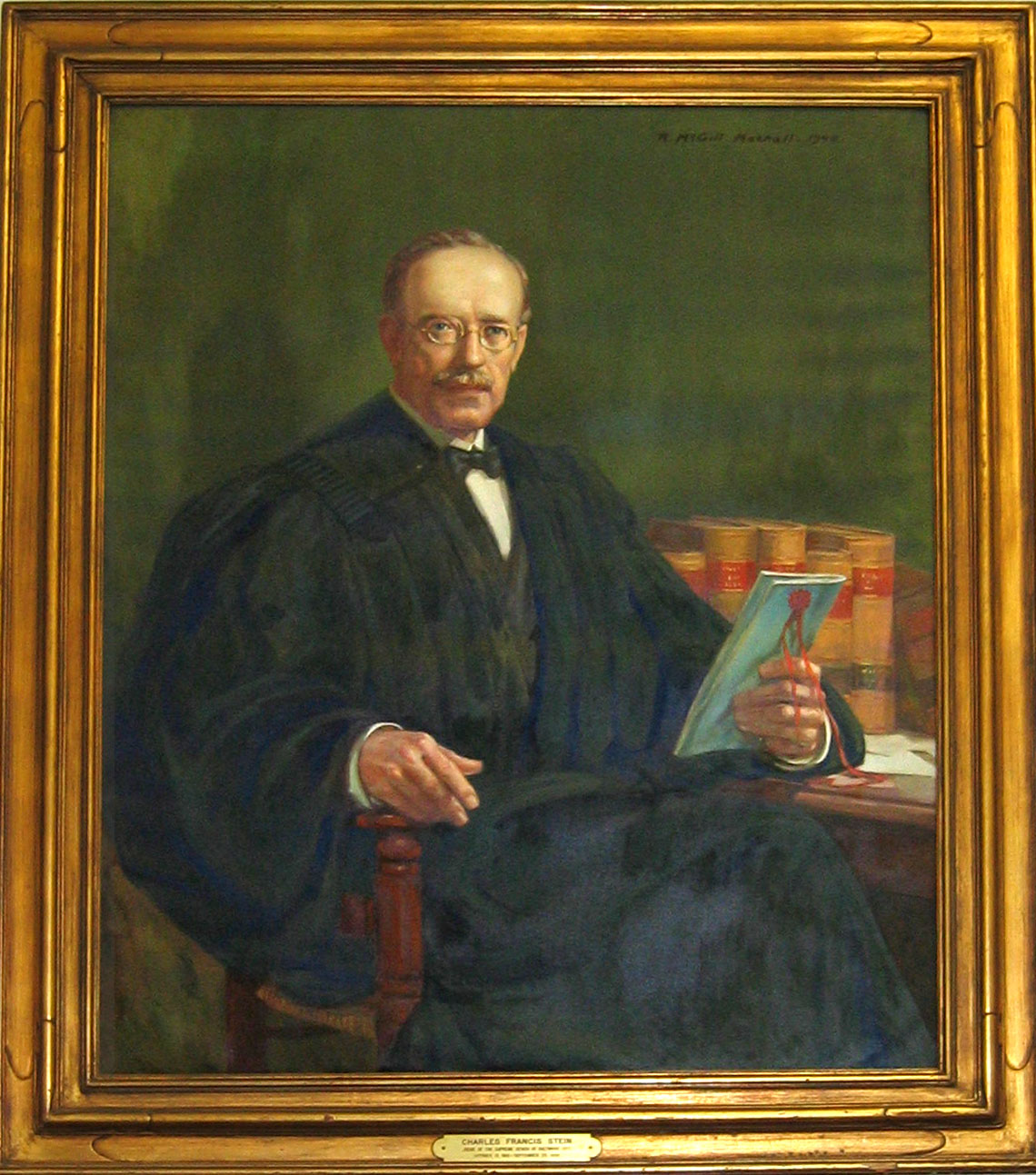
- Stein in the Baltimore City Courts

Associate Judge, Supreme Bench of Baltimore City
- In office 1921–1936

Personal details
- Born: September 25, 1866 Baltimore, Maryland, U.S.
- Died: May 5, 1939 Roland Park, Baltimore, Maryland, U.S.
- Spouse: Ella W. Griffith
- Children: 2
- Education: Baltimore City College; University of Maryland School of Law
- Occupation: Judge; attorney

Charles Francis Stein Sr. (September 25, 1866 – May 5, 1939) was an American attorney and jurist who served as an Associate Judge of the Supreme Bench of Baltimore City from 1921 to 1936. He practiced law in Baltimore for nearly fifty years, specializing in real estate, and was noted for his involvement in several German‑American civic institutions.

== Early life and education ==
Stein was born in Baltimore, Maryland, the son of Dr. Attila Edward Stein and Emerald Lawrence Stein. He attended Baltimore City College and began his legal studies in the office of Baltimore attorney Jesse N. Bowen before earning his LL.B. from the University of Maryland School of Law in 1889. He was admitted to the Maryland bar the same year.

== Legal career ==
According to The New York Times, Stein spent roughly a decade working in the real‑estate and building industries while beginning his legal practice. He later joined Louis Hennighausen to form the firm Hennighausen & Stein, where he practiced for the remainder of his life except during his judicial service. His legal work focused heavily on real‑estate matters.

== Judicial service ==
Stein was appointed to the Supreme Bench of Baltimore City on October 15, 1921, by Governor Albert C. Ritchie, succeeding Judge James P. Gorter. He won election two months later and served for fifteen years until his mandatory retirement at age 70 in 1936.

== Personal life ==
Stein married Ella W. Griffith of Washington, D.C., in 1897. They had two children: Charles F. Stein Jr. and Clara Stein.

Stein was active in Baltimore’s German‑American community. He served on the board of the General German Aged People’s Home in Baltimore, later known as Edenwald Retirement Community, and participated in several German‑American organizations. Members of Stein’s family remained active in Baltimore’s German‑American civic organizations for several decades, including leadership roles in the German Society of Maryland.

Stein died at his home in Roland Park on May 5, 1939, at age 72.

== Legacy ==
Stein’s judicial work was preserved in a 1936 presentation volume, Opinions Delivered by Judge Charles F. Stein During His Service on the Supreme Bench of Baltimore City, 1921–1936. The compilation documents his reasoning in civil, equity, and municipal cases and provides a contemporary record of his contributions to Baltimore’s courts.

After his death, the University of Maryland School of Law established the Stein Memorial Fund, a loan program for students in financial need. The fund originated with Stein and continued in his memory, remaining active into the late 1960s.

== Sources ==
- "Charles F. Stein, Baltimore Jurist". The New York Times. May 6, 1939.
- "Charles F. Stein (1866–1939)". Maryland State Archives. 2005.
- McClain, William H. (1996). "German‑American Enterprises and Institutions of Baltimore: Part III" (PDF). The Report: A Journal of German‑American History. XLIII: 15–21.
- Byrnes, John Carroll (1997). Evolution of the Circuit Court of Baltimore City, 1632–1997. Baltimore Courthouse and Law Museum Foundation.
- "United States Census, 1880 — Entry for Attila E. Stein and Emerald L. Stein". FamilySearch.
- "Vereinsnachrichten, June/July 2009" (PDF). German Society of Maryland. 2009.
- University of Maryland School of Law Catalogue 1961–1962 and Announcement for 1962–1963 (PDF). University of Maryland. 1962.
- Stein, Charles F. (1936). Opinions Delivered by Judge Charles F. Stein During His Service on the Supreme Bench of Baltimore City, 1921–1936. Daily Record.
