= Mary Kay Stein =

American mathematician

- Occupation: Mathematics educator
- Employer: University of Pittsburgh
- Known for: Learning sciences and policy; work at the Learning Research and Development Center (LRDC)

Mary Kay Stein is an American mathematics educator who works as a professor of learning sciences and policy and as the associate director and former director of the Learning Research and Development Center at the University of Pittsburgh.

== Education and career ==
Stein graduated from Pennsylvania State University in 1975, with a bachelor's degree in rehabilitation education. She stayed at Penn State for another year to earn a master's degree in counseling, and then became a staff member in the university administration. In 1980 she began her doctoral studies at the University of Pittsburgh, and she completed a Ph.D. in educational psychology there in 1986.

She worked as a researcher in the Learning Research and Development Center at the University of Pittsburgh from 1986 to 2010, and became a faculty member in the university's Department of Administrative and Policy Studies in 1995, and was promoted to professor of learning sciences and policy in 2005.

== Books ==
Stein is the co-author of:

- Improving Instruction in Algebra: Using Cases to Transform Mathematics Teaching and Learning (with Margaret Schwan Smith and Edward A. Silver, Teachers College Press, 2005)
- Improving Instruction in Geometry and Measurement: Using Cases to Transform Mathematics Teaching and Learning (with Margaret Schwan Smith and Edward A. Silver, Teachers College Press, 2005)
- Improving Instruction in Rational Numbers and Proportionality: Using Cases to Transform Mathematics Teaching and Learning (with Margaret Schwan Smith and Edward A. Silver, Teachers College Press, 2005)
- Reform as Learning: School Reform, Organizational Culture, and Community Politics in San Diego (with Lea Hubbard and Hugh Mehan, Routledge, 2006)
- Implementing Standards-Based Mathematics Instruction: A Casebook for Professional Development (with Margaret Schwan Smith, Marjorie Henningsen, and Edward A. Silver, Teachers College Press and National Council of Teachers of Mathematics, 2000; 2nd ed., 2009)
- 5 Practices for Orchestrating Productive Mathematics Discussions (with Margaret Schwan Smith, National Council of Teachers of Mathematics, 2011)
- 5 Practices for Orchestrating Productive Task-based Discussions in Science (with Jennifer L. Cartier, Margaret Schwan Smith, and Danielle K. Ross, National Council of Teachers of Mathematics, 2013)

== Recognition ==
In 2014, Stein was recognized as a Fellow by the American Educational Research Association.
