= Timeline of solar astronomy =

Timeline of solar astronomy

== 10th century ==
- 900–929 — Muhammad ibn Jābir al-Harrānī al-Battānī (Albatenius) discovers that the direction of the Sun's eccentricity is changing

== 17th century ==
- 1613 — Galileo Galilei uses sunspot observations to demonstrate the rotation of the Sun
- 1619 — Johannes Kepler postulates a solar wind to explain the direction of comet tails

== 19th century ==
- 1802 — William Hyde Wollaston observes dark lines in the solar spectrum
- 1814 — Joseph Fraunhofer systematically studies the dark lines in the solar spectrum
- 1834 — Hermann Helmholtz proposes gravitational contraction as the energy source for the Sun
- 1843 — Heinrich Schwabe announces his discovery of the sunspot cycle and estimates its period to be about a decade
- 1852 — Edward Sabine shows that sunspot number is correlated with geomagnetic field variations
- 1859 — Richard Carrington discovers solar flares
- 1860 — Gustav Kirchhoff and Robert Bunsen discover that each chemical element has its own distinct set of spectral lines
- 1861 — Gustav Spörer discovers the variation of sun-spot latitudes during a solar cycle, explained by Spörer's law
- 1863 — Richard Carrington discovers the differential nature of solar rotation
- 1868 — Pierre Janssen and Norman Lockyer discover an unidentified yellow line in solar prominence spectra and suggest it comes from a new element which they name "helium"
- 1893 — Edward Maunder discovers the 1645-1715 Maunder sunspot minimum

== 20th century ==
- 1904 — Edward Maunder plots the first sunspot "butterfly diagram"
- 1906 — Karl Schwarzschild explains solar limb darkening
- 1908 — George Hale discovers the Zeeman splitting of spectral lines from sunspots
- 1925 — Cecilia Payne proposes hydrogen is the dominant element of the Sun, not iron
- 1929 — Bernard Lyot invents the coronagraph and observes the corona with an "artificial eclipse"
- 1942 — J.S. Hey detects solar radio waves
- 1949 — Herbert Friedman detects solar X-rays
- 1960 — Robert B. Leighton, Robert Noyes, and George Simon discover solar five-minute oscillations by observing the Doppler shifts of solar dark lines
- 1961 — Horace W. Babcock proposes the magnetic coiling sunspot theory
- 1970 — Roger Ulrich, John Leibacher, and Robert F. Stein deduce from theoretical solar models that the interior of the Sun could act as a resonant acoustic cavity
- 1975 — Franz-Ludwig Deubner makes the first accurate measurements of the period and horizontal wavelength of the five-minute solar oscillations
- 1981 — NASA retrieves data from 1978 that shows a comet crashing into the Sun

== 21st century ==
- 2004 — largest solar flare ever recorded occurs
