= Arthur Stein (political scientist) =

Arthur Asher Stein (born November 19, 1950) is a Professor of Political Science at the University of California, Los Angeles.

Specialising in issues such as ethnic conflict, terrorism, economic relations, and global governance, Stein has served on the editorial boards of International Organization, the American Journal of Political Science, and International Interactions and was a member of the Statewide Steering Committee for the Institute for Global Conflict and Cooperation. He is currently an Editor of the American Political Science Review.

== Publications ==
- Why Nations Cooperate: Circumstances and Choice in International Relations (1990)
