= Kittamaqundi =

Coordinates: 38.701786°N 77.043445°W

- Piscataway village
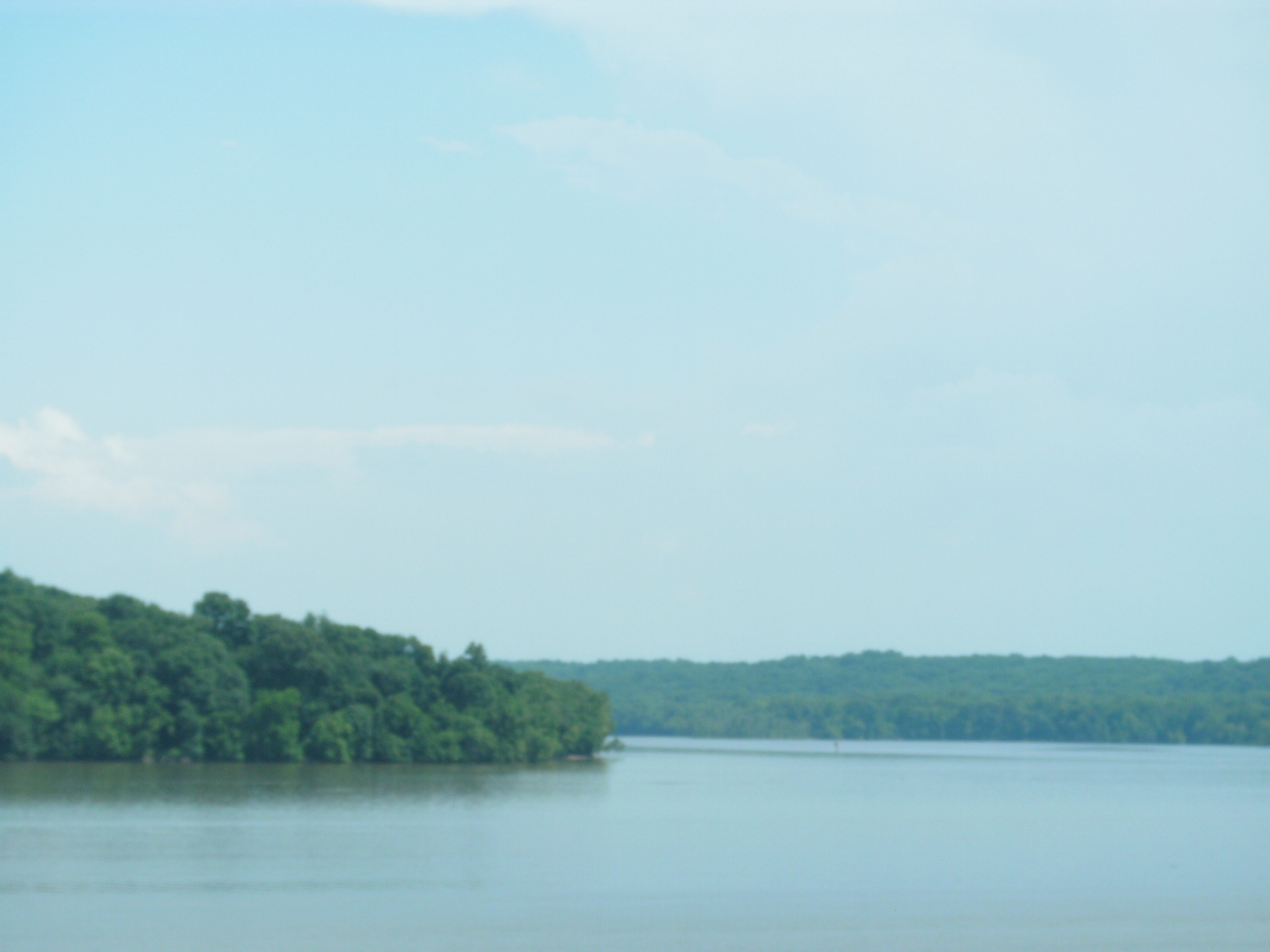
- Piscataway Creek
- Interactive map of Kittamaqundi
- Country: United States of America
- State: Maryland
- County: Prince George's
- Established: Pre 1634

Government
  - Tayac: Kittamaquund

Population (2013)
  - Estimate: Disbanded
- Time zone: UTC-5 (EST)
  - Summer (DST): UTC-4 (EDT)

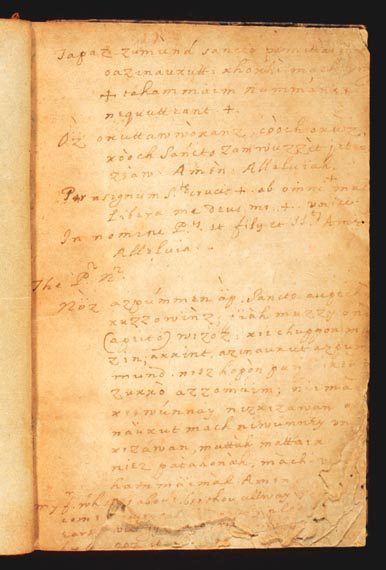
Manuscript prayers written between 1634 and 1640 in English, Latin, and Piscataway in the hand of Andrew White SJ, the first Catholic missionary to the Maryland colony. In the blank Pages of an Edition of Manuale sacerdotum hoc est, ritus administrandi sacramenta. Printed in Douai 1610. In the Lauinger Library, University of Georgetown

Around 1622, the Piscataway tribe built a town they soon called Kittamaqundi on Piscataway Creek near the modern day town of Piscataway, Prince George's County, Maryland.

== Etymology ==
When English first visited the town, in 1634, they learned it was named after the relatively new Tayac (leader) named Kittamaquund, who had assumed power the previous year after killing his brother Wannas. Some English transliterated the Algonkian name Kittamaquund as Chitomachen. One author translated Kittamaqundi as "Great Beaver Place" and Chitomachen as "strong bear".

== History ==
Previously, the Piscataway's principal town (and the site of its cemetery and holy places) had been Moyaone on the Accokeek Creek near the Potomac River, which was abandoned after a fire. Famine and disease in previous years, and retaliation by either the English or members of the Powhatan Confederacy could have contributed to Moyaone's abandonment, for Kittamaquund would pursue an assimilation or accommodation strategy with the English. Wahunsenacawh, the former Mamanatowick of the Powhatan Confederacy across the Potomac River, had died in 1618, and in his last years had convinced his member tribes near Jamestown, Virginia (including the Kecoughtan and Chickahominy) to stop trading grain to the English settlers, who he wished would leave. The Piscataway (later called Conoys), who were not under Powhatan's control, remained willing to trade foodstuffs with the English who sailed to their village, since they sought assistance against Susquehannock and Seneca raiders. On March 22, 1622, the new Mamanatowick of the Powhatan Confederacy, Opchanacanough, led a series of coordinated attacks on English settlements, nearly wiping out the Jamestown settlement but for warnings given the colonists by natives friendly to them, thus beginning the second Anglo-Powhatan war.

In June 1639, Jesuits led by Father Andrew White established a mission at Kittamaqundi. White wrote of curing Kittamaquund and his son of an illness with a combination of a powder, holy water, and bloodletting and baptizing a condemned tribesman before execution. On 5 July 1640, Fr. White baptised the chief as "Charles" and his wife as "Mary" along with his counselor Mosorcoques' as John. White then married Charles and Mary. The couple entrusted their seven-year-old daughter (also Mary) to Governor Leonard Calvert and his sister-in-law Margaret Brent for education in English ways at St. Mary's City, Maryland. By 1642, six Jesuits lived in the village. The Jesuits abandoned the village in 1643 after Susquehannock raiders took men and supplies. In 1644, as another Anglo-Powhatan war neared its end and English religious wars spread and nearly obliterated the Maryland colony, the English occupied the town as a protective outpost.

By 1675, the Susquehannock displaced by English settlers who had taken over Kittamaqundi's agricultural fields and built a 180 foot long palisade wall. Virginia and Maryland militia led by Major Truman blamed the Susquehannock for killing settlers across the Potomac River in Stafford County, Virginia. Their killing of five Susquehannock chiefs who agreed to a peace parley, as well as the town's destruction, led to revenge killings across the Potomac in Virginia, precipitating Bacon's Rebellion.

Piscataway signed a treaty with William Penn in 1701. Many had settled near Conoy (their name to the Haudenosaunee) creek in Pennsylvania by 1718. In 1704, English settlers laid out the town of Piscataway, Maryland near or on the site of Kittamaqundi. A stained glass at Saint Ignatius Church in nearby Port Tobacco, Maryland depicts Kittamaquund's baptism.

=== Village life ===
Villagers lived in oval tent structures made of hide covered saplings with a central hole for light and ventilation for a fire. Tribe leaders used beds raised above the ground by four posts. Wooded areas would have been cleared by the traditional technique of stripping bark off trees to kill them, then using fire to clear a field. Once cleared, mounds of dirt would host corn comingled with bean plants using the stalks for support. Squash would be grown between the mounds. The river based village would also collect fish and oysters using dugout canoes. Kittamaquund was described as wearing shells to denote his role as leader.

== See also ==
- Caiuctucuc
- Cockacoeske
- Massawomeck
- Piscataway people
- Piscataway, Maryland
- Mary Kittamaquund
- Tamanend
- Lake Kittamaqundi – A man made lake in Columbia, Maryland in 1966, named by The Rouse Company developers claiming "Kittamaqundi" translates to "friendly meeting place". The Columbia Association and several writers have claimed that Kittamaqundi is the oldest known Native American settlement in Howard County.
- Kittamaqundi Community – A branch of the Washington D.C. Baptist Church of the Savior formed in Columbia in 1970 by Gordon Cosby.
- Indian Queen Bluffs – A Prince George's County site named after empress Mary
