= Giles Brent =

Acting governor of colonial Maryland (died 1672)

- Born: Gloucestershire
- Died: 1672 (in Julian calendar)
- Resting place: Aquia
- Spouse(s): Mary Kittamaquund
- Children: Giles Brent
- Relatives: Margaret Brent
- Position held: Colonial Governor of Maryland

Giles Brent (sometimes Gyles, d. 1672) was an English colonist in the Province of Maryland and Virginia Colony. As a Roman Catholic family, Brent and his siblings emigrated away from Protestant-favoring England in the 1630s. Giles lived on Kent Island and eventually became acting governor of Maryland. He was married to Mary Kittamaquund, the daughter of a Piscataway chief. After a disagreements with Lord Baltimore, Giles and sisters moved to Northern Neck, Virginia, where they established major tracts of property. Giles's son, Giles Brent II was active during Bacon's Rebellion.

== Early life and family (England) ==
Giles was the son of Sir Richard Brent and Elizabeth Brent (née Reade or Reed). Elizabeth's father was named Giles Reade. The Brents were of Gloucestershire of South West England, at Lark Stoke and Admington in 1553. Sir Richard Brent was High Sheriff of Gloucestershire for a time. Richard and his wife were close to Fulke Greville, 1st Baron Brooke, part of King James I's court.

In 1619, Sir Richard's daughter Catherine converted to Catholicism, with the family eventually all joining the faith. Catherine and other sisters joined an abbey in Cambrai starting in 1628.

== In Maryland (1637 to 1645) ==
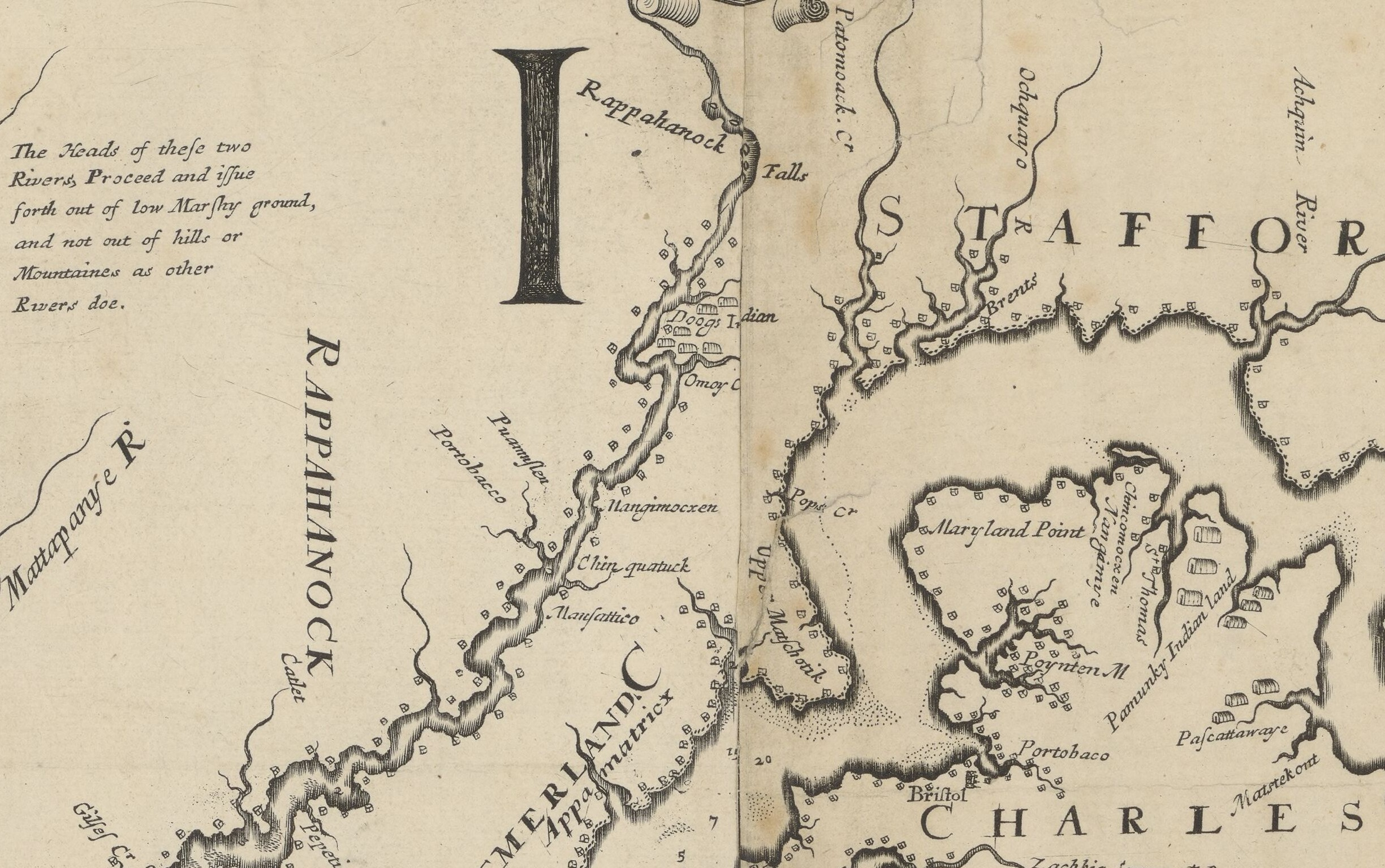
Cropped map of Stafford and Rappahanock regions of Virginia, 1670

Some sources say that Giles Brent was enlisted by the Virginia Company of London in 1621 to chart the Chesapeake Bay. Most records begin Brent's residence in the New World in 1637/8. Aged about 27 years old, Brent sailed from England on the ship Elizabeth to the Province of Maryland. With Maryland being a quasi-refuge for Catholics, Giles's brother Fulk (or Fulke) Brent and his sisters Margaret Brent and Mary Brent emigrated later in 1638. Giles held the office of Treasurer of the colony in about 1640. He had property near St. Mary's City, but then in February 1639, replaced a William Brainthwayte (Braithwaite) as commander of Kent Fort on the Isle of Kent, an island which was heavily contested at times by native Susquehannock people and by previous landholder William Claiborne.

Giles Brent was a councillor [sic] in the Maryland General Assembly c. 1642. In April 1643, Brent was deputized as Governor and also named "Lieutenant General, Admiral, Chief Captain, Magistrate, and Commander [of Maryland]" by Leonard Calvert whilst he traveled to England.

During that time, Brent commissioned Thomas Cornwallis to subdue native attacks on the English. Maryland secretary John Lewger was attempting to treat with the Piscataway by proxy, but Governor Brent did not approve and ousted him.

In late 1644, Giles Brent was approximately 38 to 40 years old. He married Mary Kittamaquund, a daughter to the Piscataway leader, who was also a juvenile ward of Governor Calvert. Mary Kittamaquund Brent's ability to speak the Algonquin language helped maintain friendly relations between the Brents and Patawomecks.

In addition to being a Catholic, Brent was a Cavalier, and stirred the Pro-Parliament rebellion that came to be known as Plundering Time. At some point in 1645, William Claiborne repossessed Kent Island. Brent and other Catholic leaders were imprisoned and taken to England by Protestant-allied pirate Richard Ingle. Giles eventually was exonerated and returned to Maryland.

Leonard Calvert died in 1647, leaving his estate matters to Margaret Brent and appointing Thomas Greene as governor of the colony.

== In Northern Virginia (1645 onward) ==
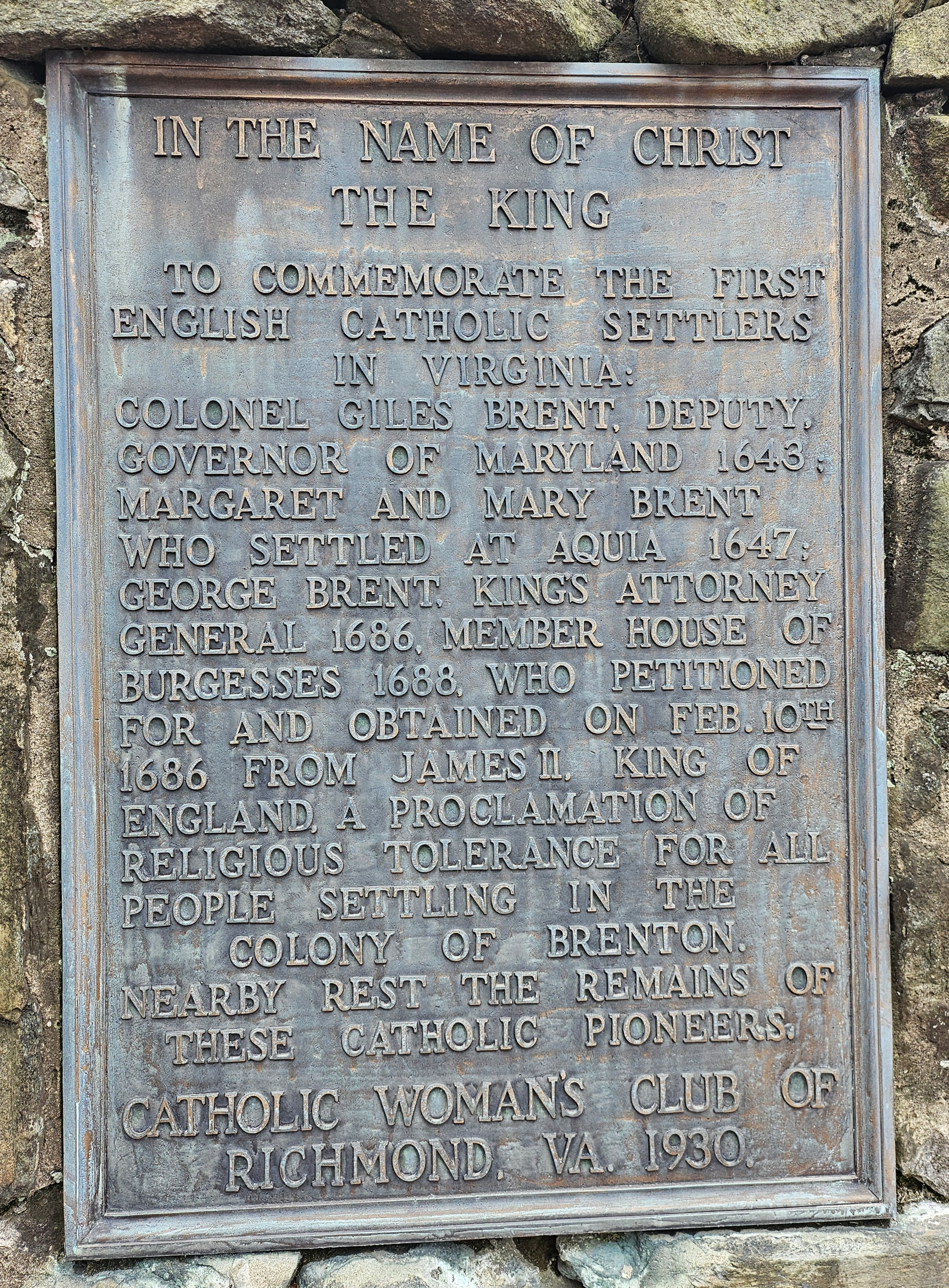
Plaque near Aquia Creek, Virginia

Giles Brent and his family fell out of favor with Cecil Calvert, 2nd Baron Baltimore and in about 1645 he, his wife, and sisters, moved south to Aquia Creek, near present-day Stafford, Virginia. Brent Point, in what is now Widewater State Park, was the site of Peace Plantation. Brent's property included "Peace Point" in what would become Marlborough Point near the mouth of Potomac Creek. It was argued that the then-frontier land was still part of the Province of Maryland. Giles Brent requested the Virginia Governor's Council to claim the land on Aquia Creek for Virginia Colony. Although considered "the most conspicuous Papists in the colony", they were not persecuted by the Protestant Virginia people. It is assumed that Virginia's leadership favored the Brents due to their anti-Maryland sentiment. In addition, Giles Brent had the "last outpost" for settlers venturing deeper into the wilderness. Brent's neighbors in Northern Neck were Captain George Mason I, Colonel Gerrard Fowke, and a John Lord.

Giles also had estates called "Retirement" and "Richland". In 1649, Giles and his young wife Mary lived on Chopawamsic Island in the Potomac River. By 1651, Giles Brent was called a "lieutenant colonel". He is listed as the rank of Captain of the militia in Virginia records. Mary Kittamaquund Brent died c. 1655. By native Indian law, her three children, Richard, Giles (II) and Mary (II) inherited her Maryland lands. Giles (I) attempted to lay claim to these lands, but was unsuccessful.

In 1662, Giles Brent and his neighbors feuded with native Patawomeck chief Wahanganoche (or Whipsewasin). Brent had re-arrested the chief on charges he was acquitted for previously by the colonists. The Virginia General Assembly fined Brent and forbade him from holding any public office.

By 1670, nephew George Brent arrived in Virginia colony. The Reverend John Waugh lived across Potomac Creek (later named "Waugh Point") from the Brents. Described as a quarrelsome person, Waugh's anti-Catholic views seeded distrust in the Brent family, notably George.

== Later years and legacy ==
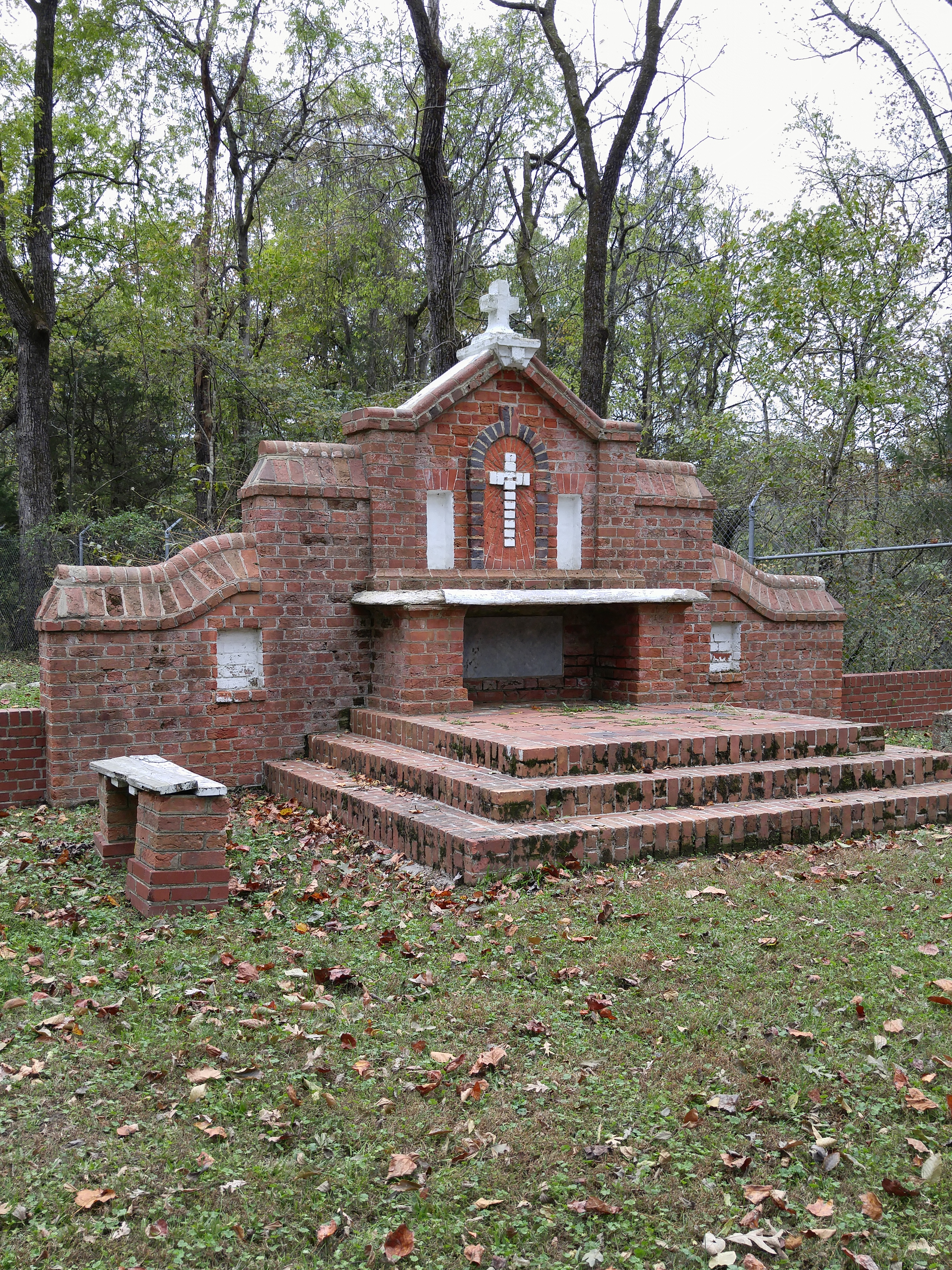
Memorial altar at the Brent family cemetery

Giles Brent likely died in the winter of 1671-1672. Giles Brent II (b. c. 1652), son of a Native American and an Englishman, was under twenty years old at the time, but became captain of the militia and held the rank of colonel. Colonel Brent (II) initially supported Bacon's Rebellion forces, but turned against Nathaniel after the rebels burned Jamestown to the ground.

Giles (the Younger) married his cousin (Mary) and had several children. In 1679, Giles II's wife divorced him due to mistreatment. Giles II died in 1679 and was buried at Christ Church (Saluda, Virginia).

In 1686, Captain George Brent was granted a land patent of 30,000 acres (120 km^{2}), lying between the Potomac and Rappahannock Rivers (later Prince William County). Granted by James II, included a royal mandate assuring the Brents and later inhabitants of Virginia should have free exercise of religion. Although the exact location is lost, Brent Town was established in this area. The town of Brenton, later called Aquia would be later established using the Brent name. Brentsville, Virginia is the namesake of the family.

A Brent Family cemetery was established in the 1680s, in present-day Aquia, Virginia. The cemetery is still used for field masses by the Knights of Columbus.

== See also ==
- Colonial families of Maryland
- George Brent
- George Mason I
- William Brent Jr.
- Northern Neck Proprietary
