= Lake Kittamaqundi =

Reservoir in Columbia, Maryland, United States

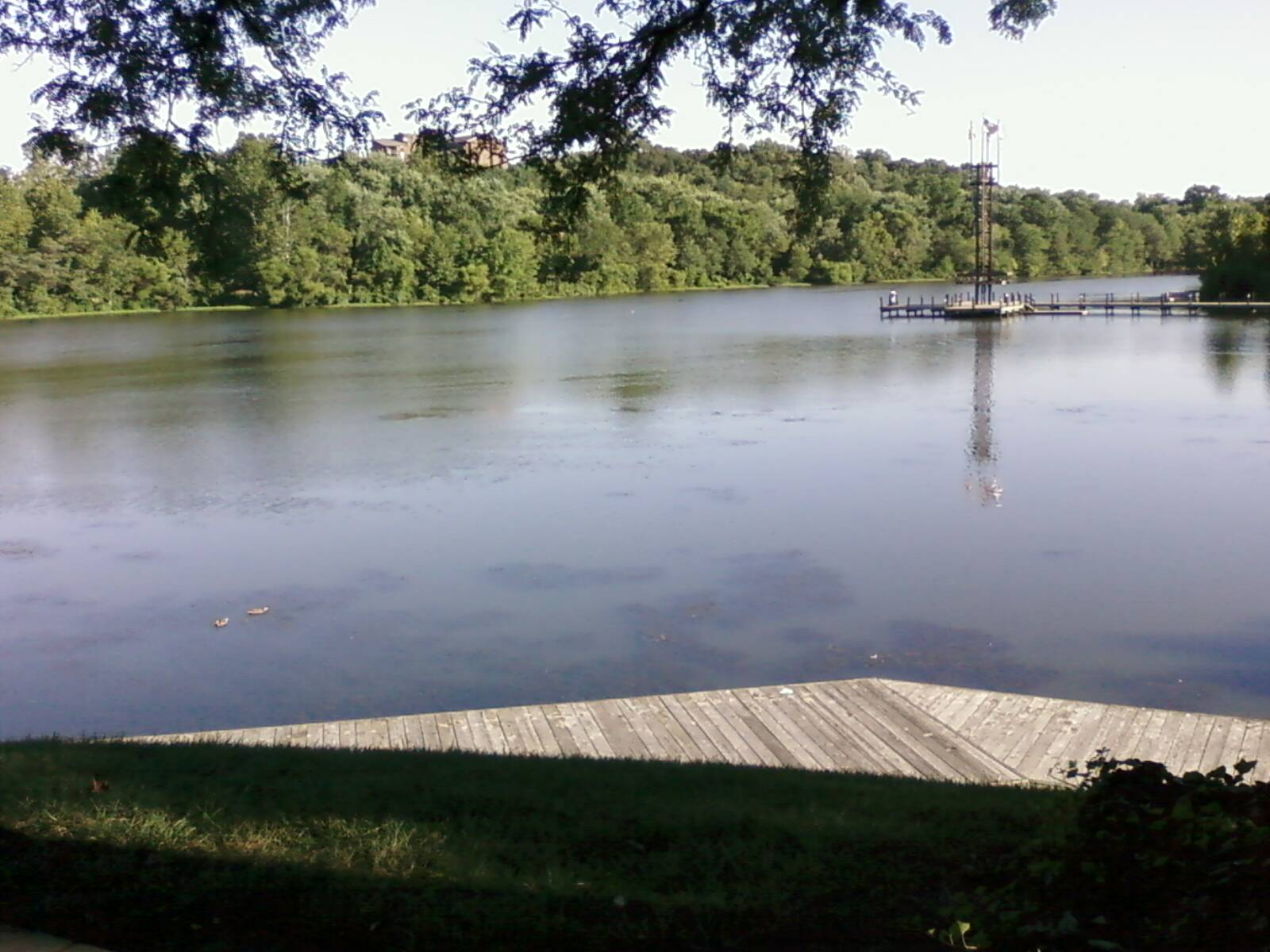
- Lake Kittamaqundi

- Location within Maryland Location within the United States
- Location: Town Center, Columbia, Maryland
- Coordinates: 39°12′43″N 76°51′19″W
- Type: manmade
- Primary inflows: Unnamed tributary of the Little Patuxent River
- Basin countries: United States
- Surface area: 27 acres (11 ha)
- Max. depth: 7 ft (2.1 m)
- Surface elevation: 299 feet (91 m)
- Islands: Nomanisan (1966-2011)

Lake Kittamaqundi is a man made 27-acre (110,000 m^{2}) reservoir located in Columbia, Maryland in the vicinity of the Mall in Columbia as well as Merriweather Post Pavilion. It is also adjacent to offices and visible from US-29.

The lake was created by The Rouse Company in 1966 during the development of Columbia. The company and its homeowners association claimed it was named after the first Indian settlement in Howard County and "Kittamaqundi" in the tribe's language translates to "meeting place." Kittamaqundi actually was a 17th-century Piscataway village 40 miles (64 km) south that was named after its ruler, Kittamaquund. "Kittamaqundi" translates to "Great Beaver Place" or "Strong Bear".

The area surrounding the lake is a popular location for various summer festivals and 4th of July fireworks.

== History ==
Kittamaqundi is one of three man-made lakes created with the construction of the Columbia development. The lake served a dual purpose as a recreational feature and a low cost primary catch basin for water runoff from Wilde Lake into the Little Patuxent River. In 1973 Hittman Associates was contracted by the EPA to recommend the reuse of storm water runoff from Columbia's reservoir system for residential drinking water to save on development costs.

One Kittamaqundi drowning in 1971 was ruled a suicide, with the recovery of the body inspiring the Stephen Amidon book The New City. Another drowning occurred in 1972 from an overturned canoe.

In 1977, a wooden flagpole structure built 10 years earlier displaying the American, State, and County flags was converted to a bell tower triggered every 15 minutes from Rouse headquarters. The tower was dismantled 2010 due to wood rot. The Columbia Association budgeted $75,000 in 2014 to rebuild the tower for the 50th anniversary of Columbia.

In 1990 funding was sought for a pathway around the lake though it wasn't completed until 2014. Also in 1990, migrant geese were relocated and replaced with Trumpeter swans. Groups of teens gathered at the lakefront at night causing crime and violence. Howard County policeman Herman Charity attributed the events to non-residents coming to take advantage of wealthier Columbia residents. In 1996, police patrols were increased along the lake and adjoining neighborhoods. In 1997, Canada goose droppings were costing the Columbia Association $20,000 a year in cleaning costs. A Border Collie and handler was hired for $17,000 a year to chase migrant geese from the lake.

Lake Kittamaqundi originally featured an island known as Nomanisan Island, named by Columbia resident Alan Levine in a 1980 contest held by the Columbia Association. The island's name came from the phrase "No Man Is an Island" by John Donne. The gap between the island and the east bank of the lake was filled, creating a peninsula, during the dredging of the lake in 2010.

A $70,000 statue of Jim and Willard Rouse was commissioned by his son's company Rouse & Associates and displayed in front of the Symphony Woods Office Building. The statues were put into storage for two and a half years due to vandalism, then sold to the Columbia Association in 2000 for $10,000 and positioned along the lakefront in 2001.

== Environment ==
The Mall in Columbia and nearby offices, and buildings along Little Patuxent Parkway were developed with a minimum of stormwater management, and are directly in Kittamaqunidi's watershed. In 2008, a survey posted that 55,558 pounds (25,201 kg) per year of total suspended solids (TSS) and 250 pounds (110 kg) a year of phosphorus are collected in the lake. The recommendation was to have 6.3 million dollars in stormwater retention projects implemented to mitigate the development shortcomings for Lake Kittamaqundi alone.

In the fall of 2010, dredging began in Lake Kittamaqundi. As sediment built up over the years since the lake's creation the depth of the lake was reduced. This dredging effort focused on restoring the lake to the original depths, reinforcing the banks, and creating two new peninsulas to enhance water flow. The dredging was completed in November 2011.

In April 2014 a leaking diesel fuel holding tank at the Vantage House senior living facility filled the stormwater drains and deposited hundreds of gallons of diesel into Lake Kittamaqundi which had to be cleaned by Howard County Fire and Rescue.

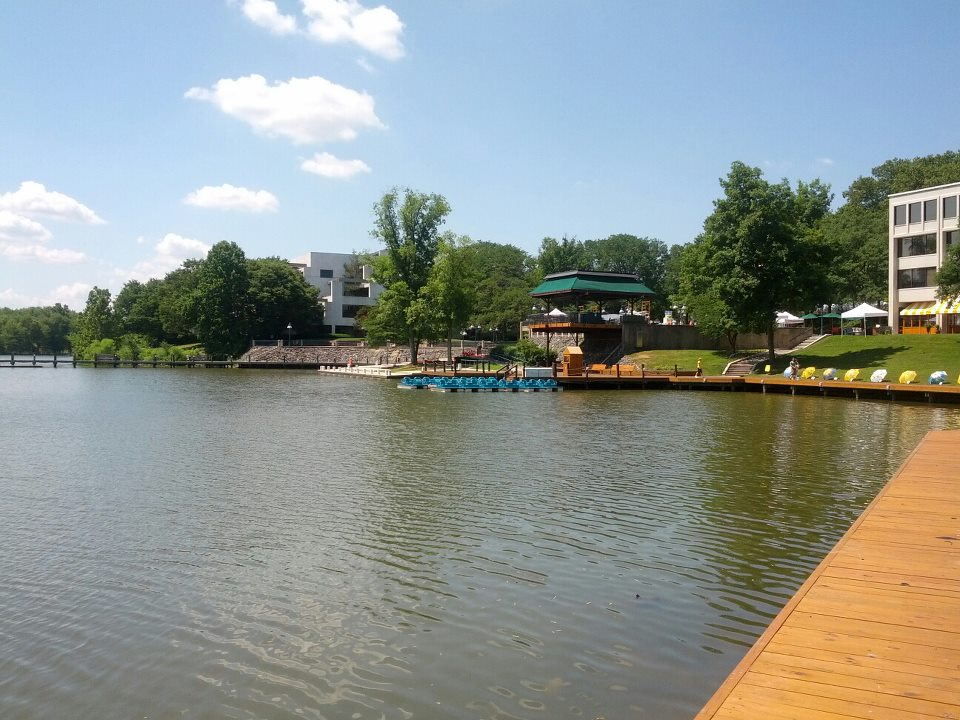
Lake Kittamaqundi lakefront on Columbia's 45th anniversary.

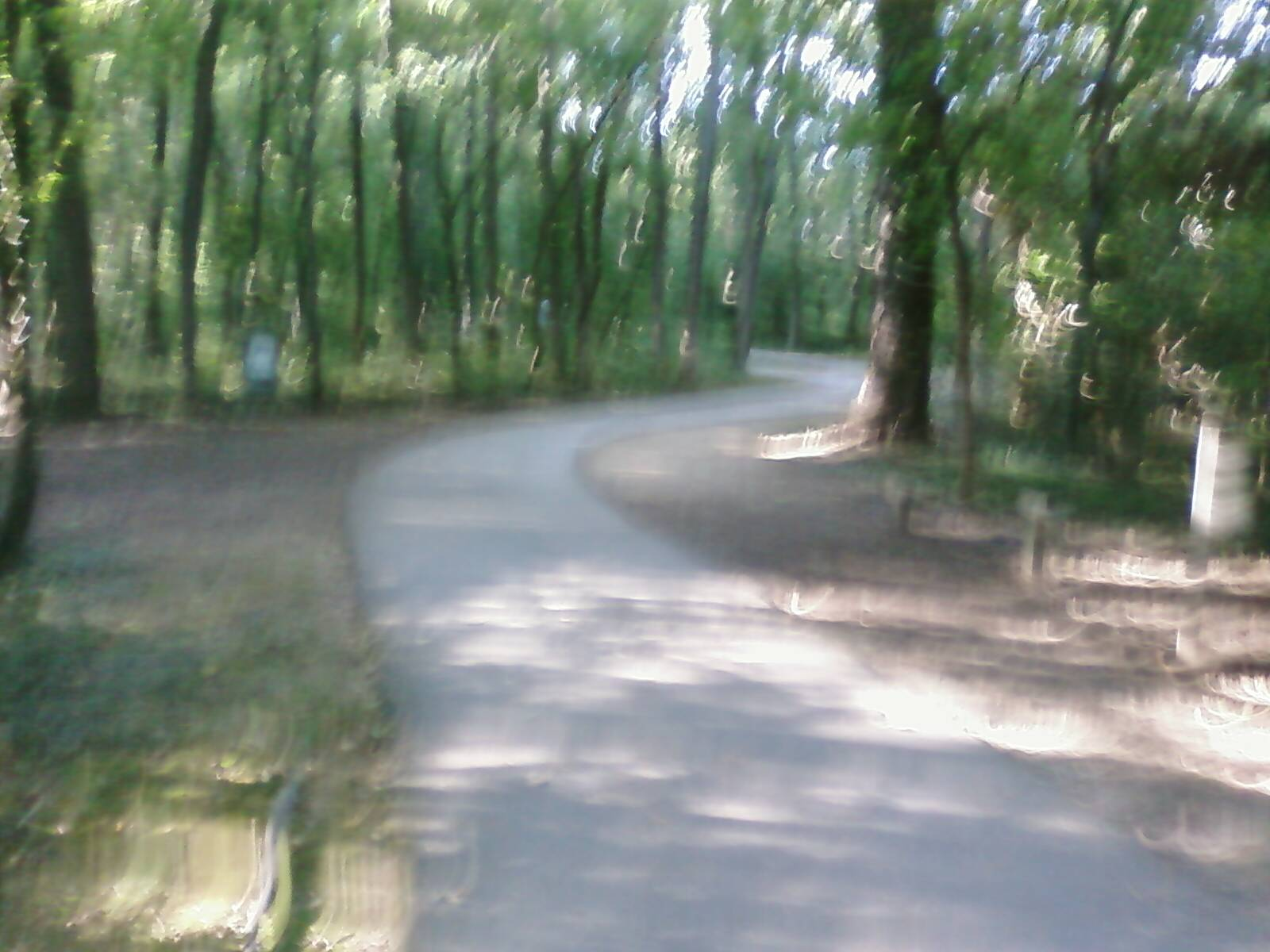
The trail around Lake Kittamaqundi

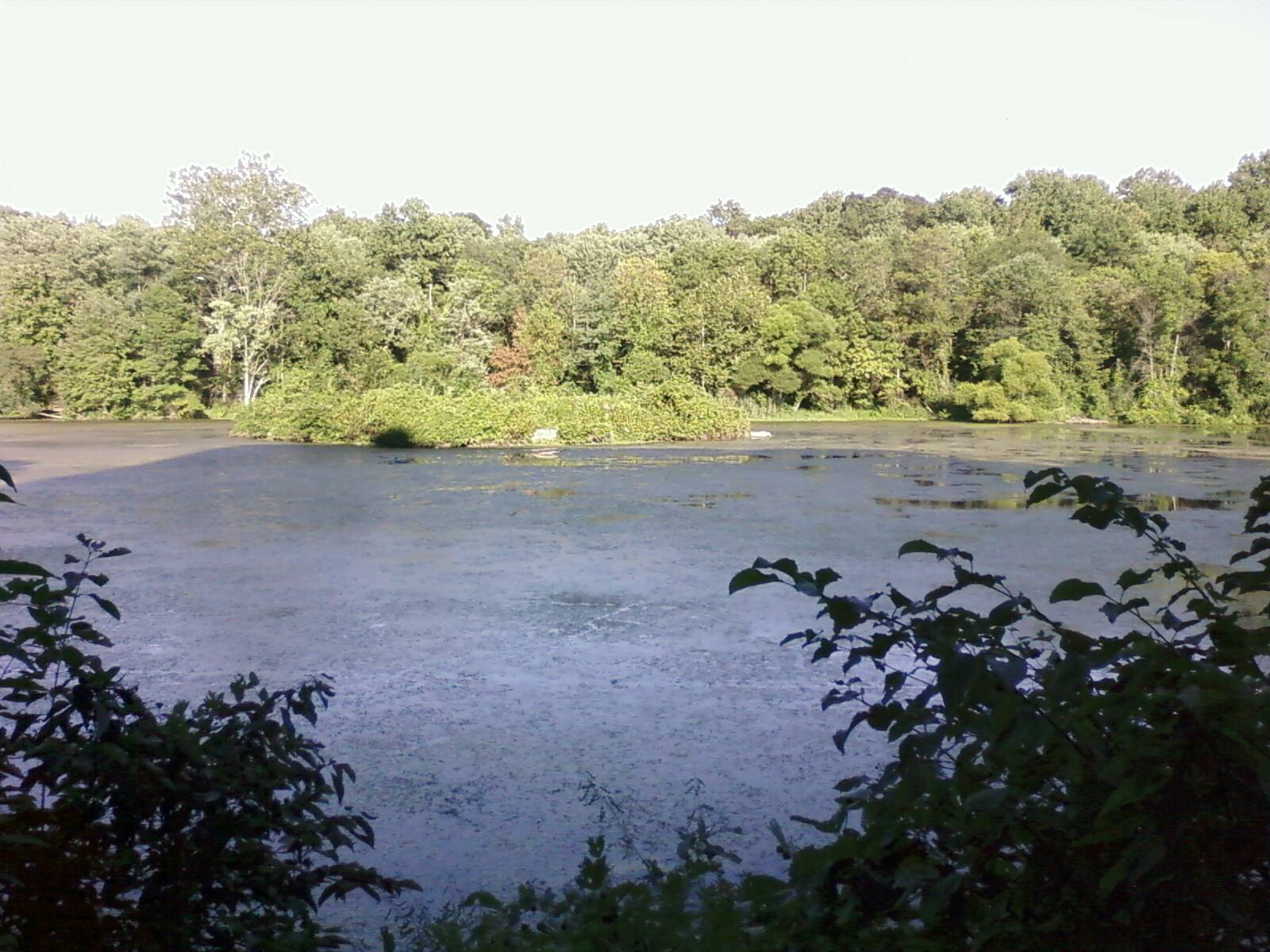
The former Nomanisan Island

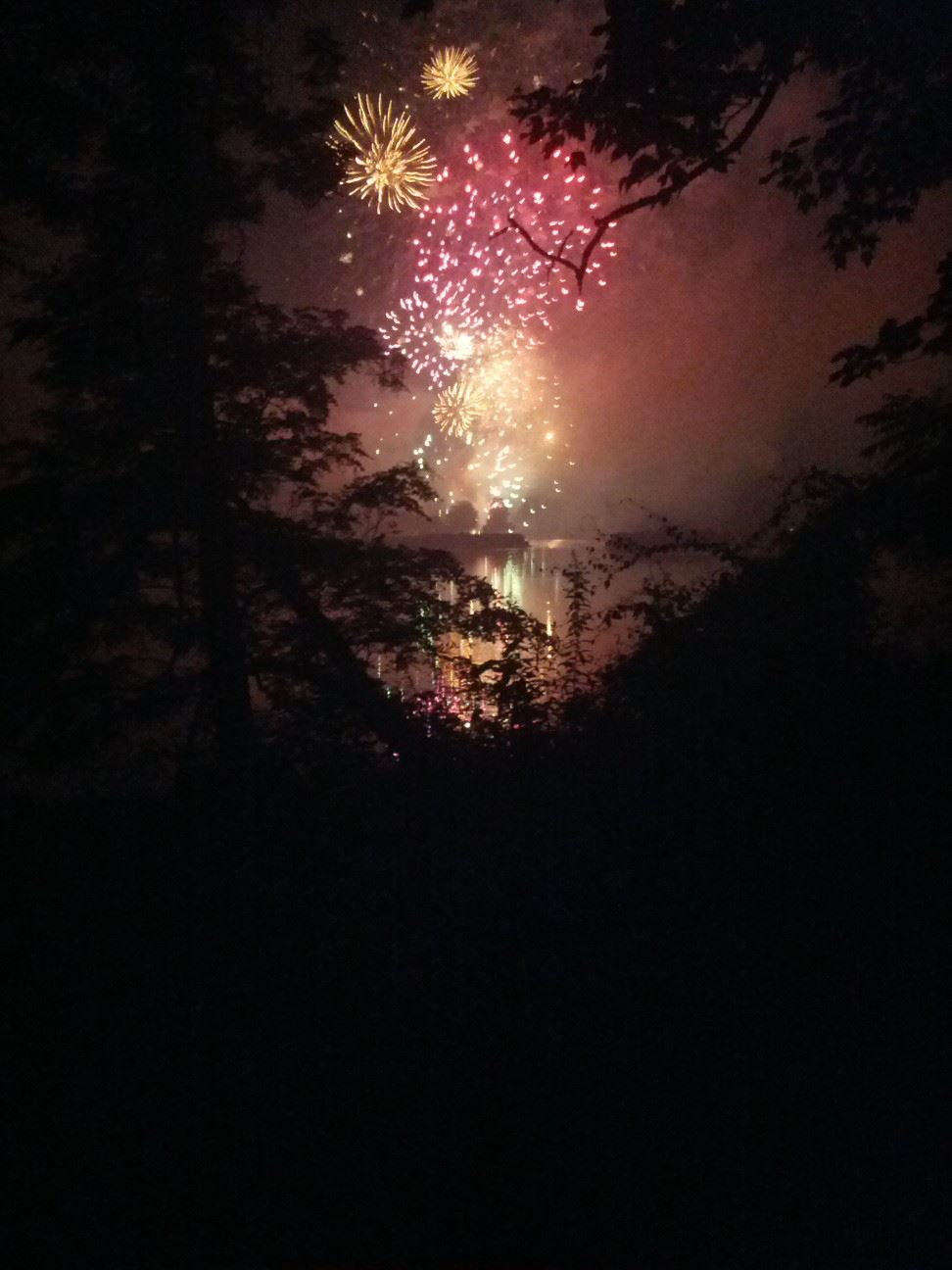
Fireworks at the Lake Independence Day 2013

=== Fish species ===
A variety of fish species live in this lake including:

- Bluegill
- Pumpkinseed
- Redear sunfish
- Green sunfish
- Black crappie
- White crappie
- Common carp
- Largemouth bass

== See also ==
- Kittamaqundi Community Church - initiated by Rouse based on Gordon Crosby's Church of the Savior in the historic Oakland Manor stable.
- Lake Elkhorn
- Wilde Lake
