= Piscataway language =

Extinct Algonquian language of Maryland, US

Piscataway
- Conoy
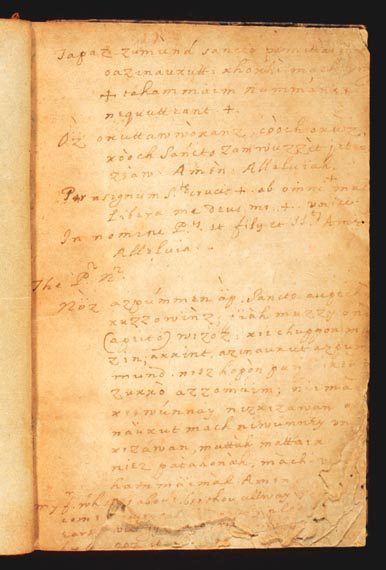
- Catholic Catechism prayers handwritten in the Piscataway, Latin, and English languages by a Catholic missionary to the Piscataway tribe, Andrew White, SJ, ca. 1634–1640. Lauinger Library, Georgetown University
- Native to: United States
- Region: Maryland
- Ethnicity: Piscataway people
- Extinct: 1748
- Language family: Algic: Algonquian; Eastern Algonquian; Piscataway

Language codes
- ISO 639-3: psy
- Glottolog: pisc1239

Piscataway (/pɪˈskætəweɪ/ pih-SKAT-ə-way) is an extinct Algonquian language formerly spoken by the Piscataway, a dominant chiefdom in southern Maryland on the Western Shore of the Chesapeake Bay at time of contact with English settlers. Piscataway, also known as Conoy (from the Iroquois ethnonym for the tribe), is considered a dialect of Nanticoke.

This designation is based on the scant evidence available for the Piscataway language. The Doeg tribe, then located in present-day Northern Virginia, are also thought to have spoken a form of the same language. These dialects were intermediate between the Native American language Lenape spoken to the north of this area (in present-day Delaware, New Jersey, Maryland, Pennsylvania, New York, and Connecticut) and the Powhatan language, formerly spoken to the south, in what is now Tidewater Virginia.

== Classification ==
Piscataway is classified as an Eastern Algonquian language, closest with Nanticoke.

== History ==
Piscataway is not spoken today, but records of the language still exist. According to The Languages of Native North America, Piscataway, otherwise called Conoy (from the Iroquois name for the tribe), was a dialect of Nanticoke. This assignment depends on the insufficient number of accessible documents of both Piscataway and Nanticoke. It is identified with the Lenape dialects (Unlachtigo, Unami, and Muncy; spoken in what is now called Pennsylvania, Maryland, Delaware, New Jersey, New York, and Connecticut), and is more closely connected to Powhatan, which was formerly spoken in the area of present-day Virginia. The first speakers lived on the western shore of the Chesapeake Bay, today part of Maryland. In particular, they occupied the range of the lower Potomac and Patuxent River seepages. "Potomac" is a Piscataway word (Patawomeck) that translates to "where the goods are brought".

The Jesuit evangelist Father Andrew White translated the Catholic catechism into the Piscataway language in the 1630s, and other English teachers gathered Piscataway language materials. The original copy is a five-page Roman Catholic instruction written in Piscataway; it is the main surviving record of the language. White also wrote a grammar dictionary, though it is now considered lost. A prominent speaker of Piscataway was Mary Kittamaquund, called the "Pocahontas of Maryland" due to her state as the daughter of a chieftain, marriage to an English settler and diplomatic ability.

The National Museum of the American Indian Mitsitam Native Foods Café is named after the Piscataway and Delaware term for 'let's eat'. Similarly the University of Maryland, College Park named a dining hall Yahentamitsi, which translates to 'a place to go to eat'.

== Phonology ==
This section gives the phoneme inventory as reconstructed by Mackie (2006).

Piscataway Consonants
| | | Labial | Alveolar | Post-alv./ Palatal | Velar | Glottal |
|---|---|---|---|---|---|---|
| Plosive | | p | t | | k | |
| Affricate | | | | tʃ | | |
| Nasal | | m | n | | | |
| Fricative | voiceless | | s | ʃ | x | h |
| Fricative | voiced | | z | | | |
| Approximant | | w | | j | | |

Vowels
| | Front | Central | Back |
|---|---|---|---|
| Close | i iː | | u uː |
| Mid | e eː | (ə) | o oː |
| Open | | a aː | |

- A mid vowel [ə] may have also been present.
