= Chopawamsic (disambiguation) =

Chopawamsic refers to several placenames in Northern Virginia, United States.

- Chopawamsic (plantation) is an 18th-century plantation on Chopawamsic Creek
- Chopawamsic Island is an island in the Potomac River
- Chopawamsic Creek is a tributary stream of the Potomac River
- Chopawamsic Recreational Demonstration Area is the former name for the Prince William Forest Park
