= John Altham =

British Jesuit missionary who came to North America to preach to the Native Americans

John Altham (1589 – November 5, 1640), also known as John Gravenor, was a British Jesuit missionary who came to North America to preach to the Native Americans.

== Life ==
He was born in Warwickshire, England, in 1589. In November 1633, he and fellow Jesuit Andrew White set sail with Governor Leonard Calvert and arrived in the Chesapeake Bay area in March 1634. Upon landing, he obtained a hut from its Indian owner, which he fitted up for religious service, and it was afterward known as "the first chapel in Maryland." He performed his missionary work among the Indians around Kent Island from 1634 till his death from yellow fever, in nearby St. Mary's, Maryland, in 1640.
