= Shelbi Nahwilet Meissner =

Shelbi Nahwilet Meissner is a Native American feminist philosopher.

Born of Luiseño and Cupeño descent, Meissner is an assistant professor at the University of Maryland. She directs the Indigenous Futures Lab, which centers Indigenous knowledges to build just, land-based futures. Her work spans Indigenous research and evaluation methods, language reclamation, epistemologies, and feminist coalition-building. She holds a PhD in philosophy with a focus on Indigenous studies and consults on curriculum design, social justice education, and Indigenizing social work.

Meissner devotes her energies to the Piscataway people. Her scholarship explores Indigenous knowledge systems as tools of resistance against settler colonialism and heteropatriarchy, with interests in identity, pedagogy, kinship, and data sovereignty.
