= Kittamaquund =

Piscataway chief

- Born: c. 1607; Maryland
- Died: c. 1641
- Partner: Mary
- Children: Mary Kittamaquund

Kittamaquund, also known as Charles Kittamaquund, was a Tayac (chief) of the Piscataway tribe during the 17th century.

== Life ==
Kittamaquund was born in what is now Maryland in 1607. His daughter was Mary Kittamaquund, who became an important figure in colonial relations between the Province of Maryland and the Piscataway tribe. Kittamaquund's older brother Wannas had been the Tayac of the Piscataway in 1634 when Leonard Calvert arrived to serve as the first proprietary governor of the Maryland colony. Wannas was distrustful of the English colonists. Records suggest that because Kittamaquund feared Wannas might go to war with the colonists, he murdered him in 1634 and replaced him as Tayac. As Tayac, Kittimaquund maintained peaceful relations with the colonists. The murder of his brother was controversial and some Piscataways objected, while others supported his leadership. Supporters of Kittamaquund viewed him as wise for having secured a fur trading relationship with the English and for gaining the tribe military protection from their rivals in the Susquehannock tribe. Following a June 1639 meeting for the Jesuit missionary Andrew White, Kittimaquund converted to Christianity in 1640. He was baptized on July 5, 1640, and was given the Christian name Charles while his wife was given the name Mary. The baptism was attended by Governor Calvert, other colonial officials, and Piscataway officials. Kittimaquund had asked for religious instruction from White after White had helped Kittimaquund recover from a serious illness. Following the conversion of Kittimaquund, many other Piscataways also converted to Christianity.

In 1641, his seven year old daughter Mary became a ward of Governor Calvert and his sister-in-law Margaret Brent. Three years later at the age of 10, Mary married Brent's 38 year old brother Giles Brent.

Kittamaquund died in 1641.

== Legacy ==
An oil painting of the baptism of Kittamaquund is featured above the vestibule of St. Mary's of Piscataway Church in Clinton, Maryland.

== See also ==
- Piscataway people
