= John Lewger =

English colonial administrator and writer

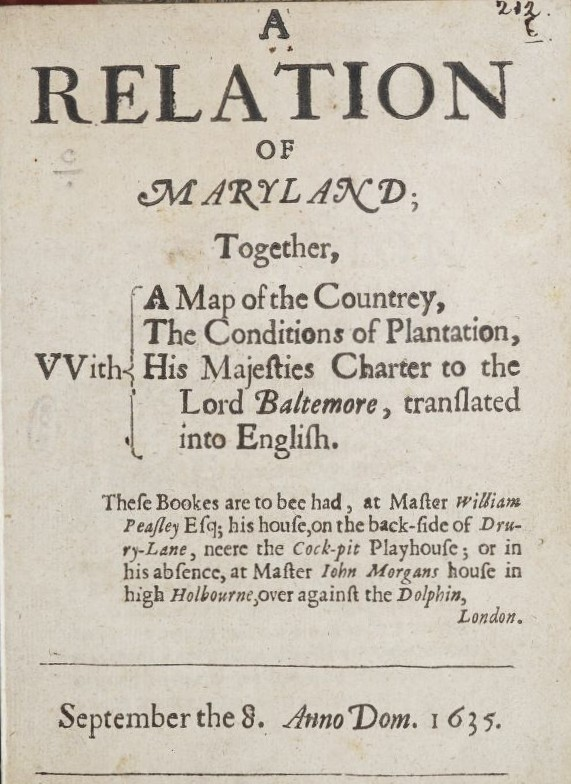
- Title page of A Relation of Maryland
- Born: 1602; London, England
- Died: 1665 (aged 62–63); London
- Other name: Lewgar
- Occupations: Minister, secretary, clerk, attorney, councilor, priest

Secretary of the Province
- In office 1637–1644
- Notable work: A Relation of Maryland; Liber Z; Erasmus Junior; Erasmus Senior

John Lewger (b. 1602 – d. 1665) was an English colonist in the Province of Maryland. His property, St. John's, was where the first General Assembly met. He was the first Secretary of the Province, among many other titles. By filing a declaration in 1637, Lewger is considered the father of the Maryland Bar Association.

== Early life ==
John Lewger was born in London, England, and educated at Trinity College, Oxford, receiving a Bachelor of Arts in 1619. At college, he befriended William Chillingworth, an Anglican who would convert to Roman Catholicism (and then back to Anglicanism). Lewger also met Cecil Calvert, 2nd Baron Baltimore, a connection that would serve him well. He joined Trinity College's faculty in 1632.

Although Lewger was an ordained Church of England minister, he converted to Catholicism in 1635.

== In Maryland ==
Lewger arrived with his wife, Anne, and nine-year-old son, John (Junior), in Maryland on 28 November 1637 aboard the Unitie [sic]. On 30 December 1637, Lewger issued a Brief in the Provincial Court. He simultaneously held several provincial offices, including Commissioner in Causes Testamentary, Surveyor General, Collector and Receiver of Rents, and Justice of St. Mary's County. While he was Secretary, Lewger acted as counsel to Lord Baltimore.

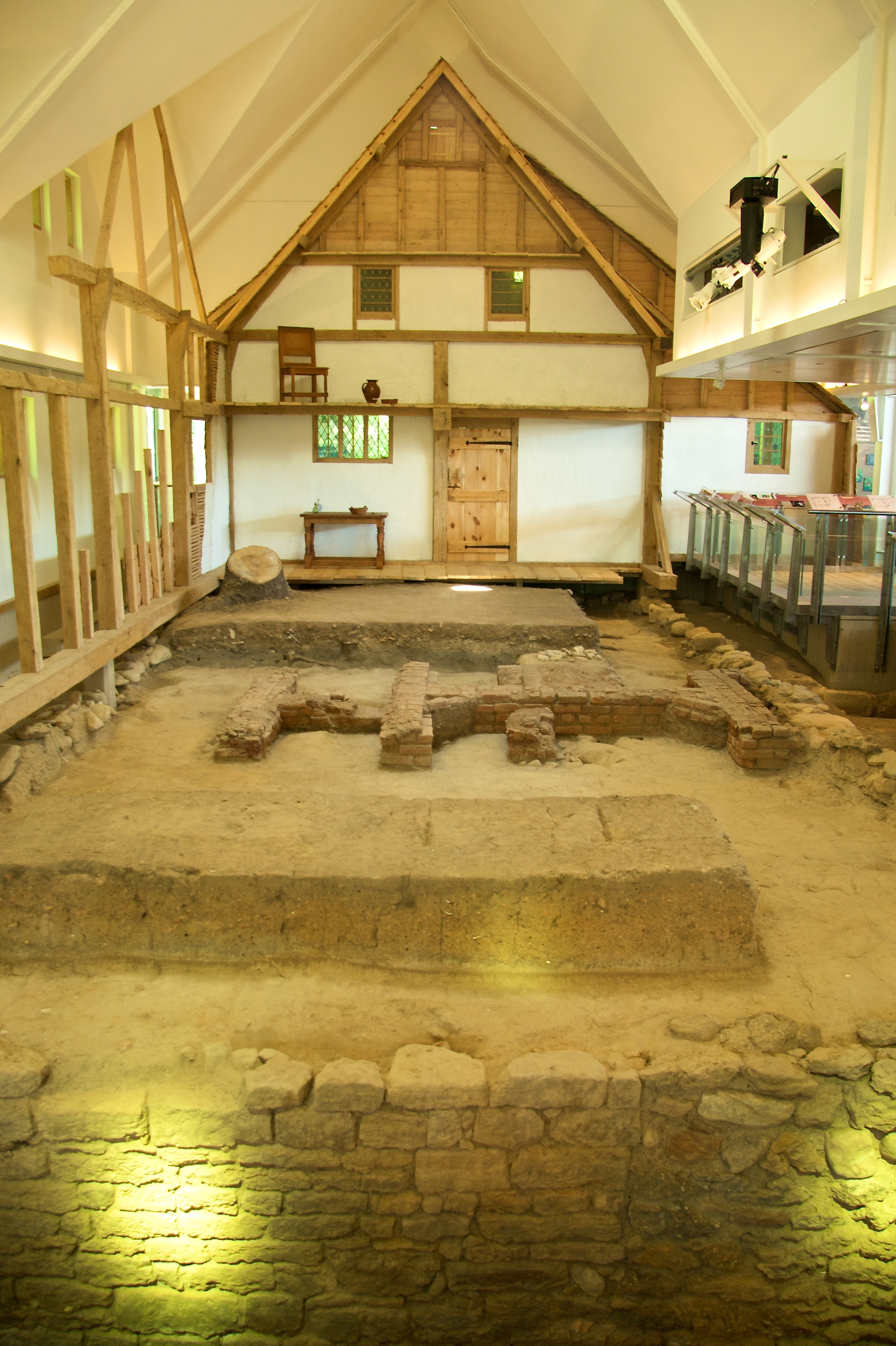
Remains of Lewger's house, St. John's

In 1638, he developed the St. John's house and plantation in St. Mary's, then Maryland's capital. He served in the Maryland House of Burgesses (the forerunner of the Maryland General Assembly) from 1637 to 1642, of which he was made a clerk. It was during this period that his wife died. In 1644, he was made Secretary of the Province. In this latter role, during the absence of Governor Leonard Calvert, he dispatched a military party to negotiate peace with the Susquehannock tribe.

When St. Mary's town was attacked by Richard Ingle in 1645, Lewger's home was ransacked and he was taken prisoner and transported back to England. After a stint as a prisoner, he was released and returned to Maryland. He served in the Upper House (the forerunner of the Maryland Senate) from 1646 to 1647.

During the English Civil War, whilst King Charles I of England was held prisoner by Parliament, Lewger was directed to collect and safeguard the King's private possessions in Maryland. Lewger returned to Maryland some time after October, 1645.

== Return to England ==
Some time in 1647, John resettled to England with his daughters Ann (II) and Cecily (or Cecelia), and became a Roman Catholic priest, serving as his friend, Cecil Calvert's, chaplain. John Junior remained at St. John's Freehold, where Margaret Brent appealed for voting rights in January 1647/48 (O.S./N.S.). As a priest, Lewger wrote several religious works in the 1650s, including Erasmus Junior and Erasmus Senior. He died during the Great Plague of London in 1665 and was interred in a mass grave.

A 2014 book, Ghost Walls: The Story of a 17th-Century Colonial Homestead by Sally M. Walker provides a fictional account of Lewger and St. John's.
