= Mattawoman =

Native American people

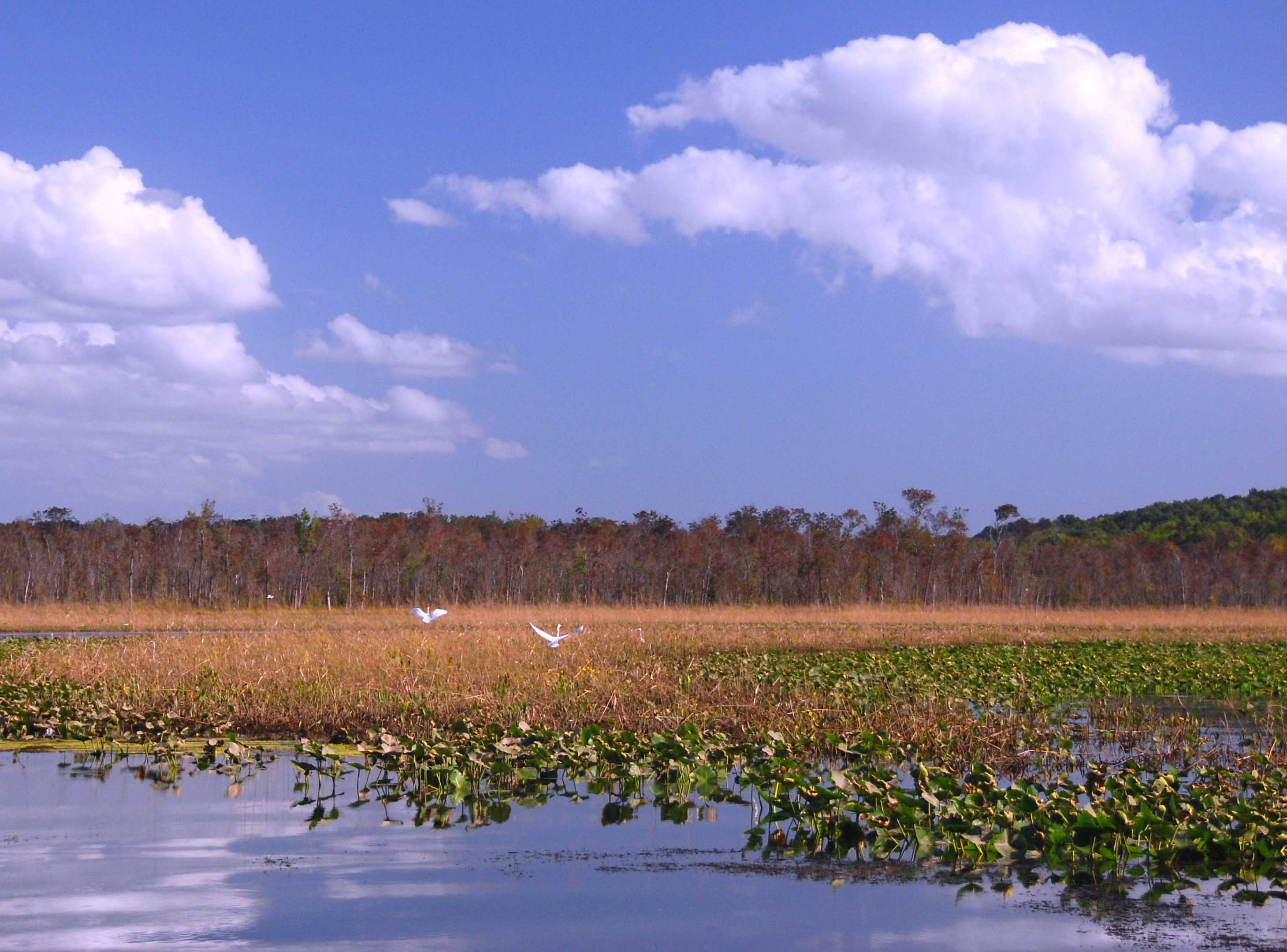
- A freshwater-tidal estuary on Mattawoman Creek, Maryland named after the Mattawoman tribe who originally lived there

Total population
- Extinct as a tribe

Regions with significant populations
- Eastern Shore of Maryland, Virginia

Languages
- Eastern Algonquian

Religion
- Native American religion

Related ethnic groups
- Piscataway

The Mattawoman (also known as Mattawomen) were a group of Native Americans living along the Western Shore of Maryland on the Chesapeake Bay at the time of English colonization. They lived along Mattawoman Creek in present-day Charles County, Maryland. They were also recorded in the early 17th century by explorer John Smith at Quantico Creek in Prince William County, Virginia. He called them Pamacocack.

== Relations with Maryland ==
The Mattawomans had a cordial relationship with the Maryland government. They were once armed, along with the Piscataways and Pamunkeys, with "matchcoats, corn, powder, and shot in return for military help.” Being distrustful of Natives, the Maryland government wanted to ensure loyalty from the Mattawomans. However, relations were not always peaceful because Maryland also took hostages then employed the help of the Mattawomans to translate during interrogations.
