= Chopawamsic =

Island in the Potomac River, Virginia, US

Coordinates: 38°30′29″N 77°17′49″W

Chopawamsic Island is one of the few islands in the Potomac River within the territorial boundaries of the Commonwealth of Virginia. It is on the west side of the river next to Marine Corps Base Quantico about 30 miles south of Washington.

== History ==
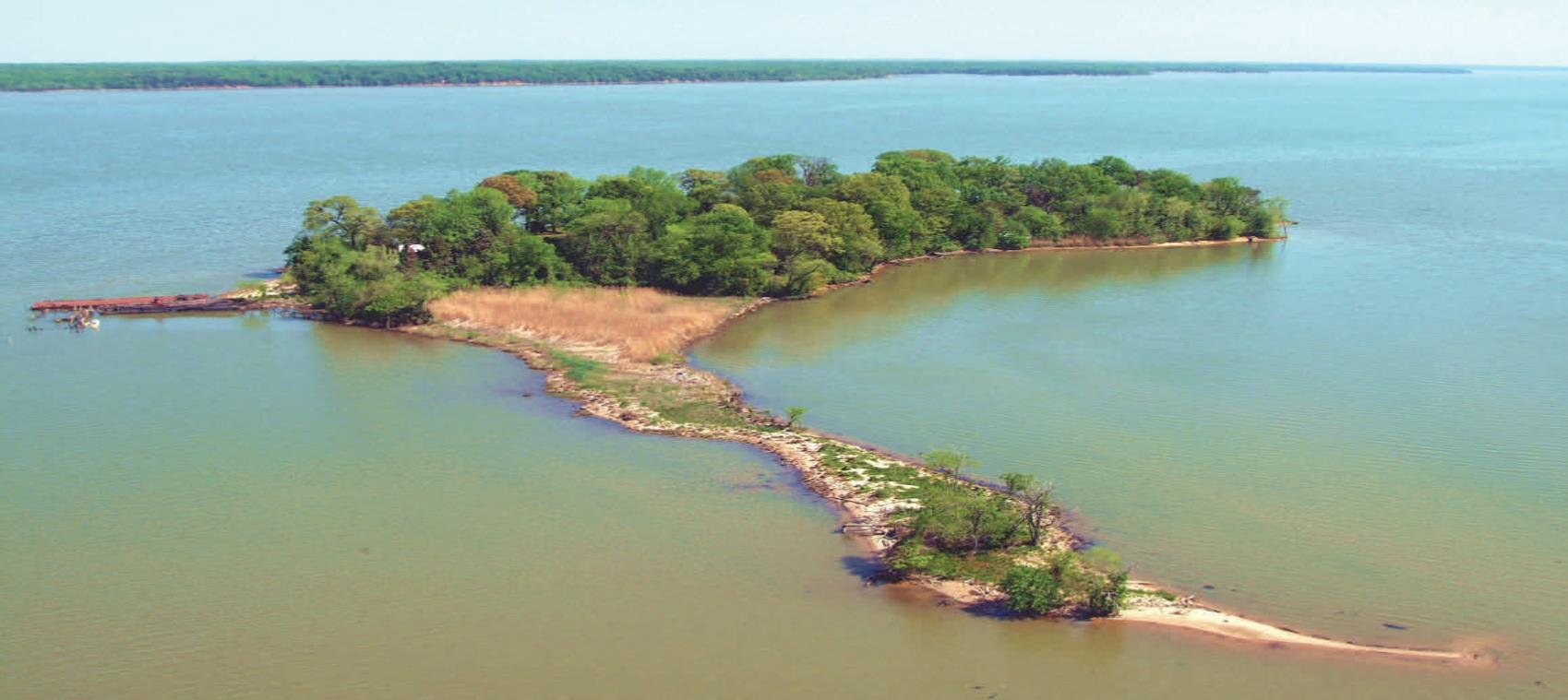
Chopawamsic Island looking east from Quantico Marine Base

Once known as Scott's Island, little is known about its history prior to the 1900s due to Stafford County's records being burned in the American Civil War. The island is accessible only by boat and has served as home to several families over the years.

The 13-acre (53,000 m^{2}) Island features a main house, guest house, caretaker's house, and other structures. All were constructed in the early 1900s and supposedly patterned after homes in Shakespeare's Stratford-upon-Avon in England. The main house has a balcony that opens to the Potomac River. All buildings are in need of extensive renovation. Electricity is provided via underwater cable. Water is provided by a 280-foot-deep well on the island. The island is for sale.

Some Civil War documents indicate that the Confederate States of America controlled the area until the winter of 1861. They had numerous camps at Quantico, and used the island for rest and recreation. Photographs of the Quantico area on display at Hospital Point on the Marine Corps base may include historic photographs of Chopawamsic Island.

== Rare plants and wildlife ==
The island is home to a mix of different wildlife habitats. Wetland species include flocks of swans, geese, and ducks that use the sheltered area for feeding and resting. Migratory songbirds abound during the temperate months, with intense activity in the spring. Ospreys and bald eagles settle here, as do waders such as green heron, great egret, and great blue heron.

== Owners ==
The first English resident of the island was Giles Brent, who settled here in 1649 with his wife, Mary Kittamaquund. She was the daughter of the Tayac (leader) named Kittamaquund, who led the Piscataway Confederacy, the most powerful on the north shore of the Potomac and one to which other tribes were members. The Piscataway were allied with the Powhatan Confederacy. At the time, they had friendly relations with the English governments in Jamestown and the colony of Maryland.

An early owner of the island was the Rev. Alexander Scott of the Church of Overwharten (now known as Aquia Church). He purchased the property from the Brent family in the early 18th century.

During the Civil War, the Stafford County Courthouse was burned. This destroyed all the original deed and documentary records related to the island's settlement. Copies may be found in the Library of Virginia.

- June 5, 1878 - E.A. Hore sold the island to Levi Woodbury of Washington DC.
- June 24, 1887 - He sold the property to the Mount Vernon Ducking Society, of which Theodore Roosevelt was a member.
- 1893 - 1903 - Samuel Langley conducted manned flight experiments from a houseboat moored Chopawamsic Island. Three flights in 1896, using Aerodrome Numbers 5 and 6, covered distances of one half mile (Aerodrome No. 6 on May 6, 1896), 3,300 feet (Aerodrome No. 5 on May 6, 1896), and 4800 feet (Aerodrome No. 6 on November 28, 1896). The official observer for the May 6, 1896 tests was Langley's friend and colleague, Alexander Graham Bell. Langley's model planes for those experiments had a wingspan of about 14 feet (4.3 m) and were powered by a small steam engine.
- The National Geographic Society owned the Island for a time.
- November 3, 1915 - Charles H. Pardoe sold the island to Charles J. Butler.
- July 29, 1958 - Wilson & Lucy Fisher sold the property to Wesley & Dee Fry.
- 1979 - The Frys offer the island for $1,050,000.00
- June 14, 1983 - Sold to Paul N. Temple.
- June 16, 1989 - The island was sold to a development partnership.

John Lennon considered purchasing the island for his home.
