= Mary Kittamaquund =

Piscataway diplomat

- Born: c. 1634; St. Mary's County, Maryland
- Died: c. 1654; Stafford County, Virginia
- Spouse: Giles Brent
- Children: 2
- Parent: Kittamaquund

Mary Kittamaquund (c. 1634 – c. 1654 or 1700) was a Piscataway woman who played a role in the establishment of the Maryland colony. The daughter of the Piscataway chieftain Kittamaquund, she was sent by her father as an adoptee to be raised by the English governor. Her life helped establish peaceful relations between English immigrants to the Maryland and Virginia colonies and their native peoples.

== Life ==
After Jesuit missionary Rev. Andrew White healed his son in 1639, Kittamaquund converted his family to the Catholic faith. Two years later, he sent his seven-year-old daughter, renamed Mary at her baptism, to be raised by Governor Leonard Calvert and by Margaret Brent. Kittamaquund wanted the English colony's leaders to educate Mary so she could communicate between the two cultures, and solicit their help against hostile tribes. The Mary Ward society was founded on the pattern of the Society of Jesus, and pioneered in the area of apostolic congregations of sisters.

=== Maryland ===
Trading, the lust for land, and religious conflicts, including the religious wars resuming in England, shaped Mary Kittamaquund's life. In late 1644, in Governor Calvert's absence, Margaret Brent had allowed her 38-year-old brother Giles Brent to marry Mary Kittamaquund, though she was just 10 or 11 years old at the time. Years later, Leonard Calvert's cousin George Talbot, while negotiating with William Penn about lands claimed by both Maryland and Pennsylvania, stated, "Capt Brent who in right of his wife the Piscataway Emperors daughter and only Child pretended a right to the most part of Maryland but could doe noe good on't after a great bustle about it."

According to various reports. Calvert was either in England with his brother soliciting support for the Maryland colony, or collecting debts and hiring soldiers in Virginia to protect it. In any event, during his absence, on February 14, 1645, raiders led by Protestant sea captain and merchant Richard Ingle and his ally Virginia fur trader William Claiborne burned the Catholic chapel and other buildings at St. Mary's City and tried to destroy the new colony. The previous year, during Governor Calvert's absence, Giles Brent had briefly jailed Ingle for treason against King Charles I. When Ingle returned, he carried letters of marque and reprisal against the king's supporters issued by the Protestant Parliament. The Ingle/Claiborne raiders also raided and burned houses of Catholic settlers on Kent Island, which had begun competing with Claiborne's former post there (which burned down in 1631 but had been rebuilt) and another of his posts at Palmer's Island. In April, Ingle and Claiborne sailed back to England with both Jesuit priests, the provincial secretary and Giles Brent all as captives and in chains.

Between December 1646 and April 1647, Governor Calvert's forces finally managed to repel the invaders (which reduced the Maryland colony from approximately 500 to 600 settlers to about 100 English). However, Calvert then fell ill and died on June 9, 1647. He had named Margaret Brent his executor, and told her to settle matters. In order to pay the mercenaries to go back across the Potomac River to Virginia, she sold Calvert's cattle. When Calvert's brother Lord Baltimore later learned this, he was upset, probably not realizing the danger his colony had faced. At some time during this period, chief Kittamaquund died, and Giles Brent (who had been freed in England and returned to Maryland) claimed all the Piscataway lands as Mary's husband. This violated Piscataway tribal customs and also conflicted with Lord Baltimore's land grant, which had given rise to the English colony in the first place. Moreover, Claiborne's erstwhile Susquehannock trading partners took their furs to the new Swedish trading post at Fort Christina.

=== Virginia ===
Nevertheless, Giles and young Mary stayed together, moving to Chopawamsic Island in the Potomac River in 1647, then the following year to the Colony of Virginia in what is now the Northern Neck near Aquia, Virginia. Giles set up a trading post, shortly after the third Anglo-Powhatan War, and ultimately a plantation named Retirement. His sisters Margaret and Mary later joined them and lived at Giles' first Virginia plantation, named Peace, in what became Stafford, Virginia.

=== Genealogy ===
Mary Kittamaquund was the daughter of Kittamaquund, Tayac of the Piscataway (leader of the Piscataway Tribes) and Mary Piscataway (Kittamaquund).

Three children are named in the 1663 and 1671 wills of Giles Brent and his sister Margaret. Margaret Brent appointed her brother Giles “and his children Giles (Jr) Brent, Mary Brent, and Richard Brent” executors of her estate. Giles left bequests to his son Giles (Jr) Brent and daughter Mary Brent (Fitzherbert). Dr. Lois Green Carr, Maryland Historian at the Maryland State Archives, left a note card in her files which identify six children of Mary and Giles, including a daughter Katherine. Giles (Jr) Brent married his cousin Mary Brent. Mary Brent married John Fitzherbert. Richard Brent died after December 26, 1663. The two other children named by Lois Carr, Henry and Margaret, presumably died young. Authors of recent DNA studies of Marsham and Beaven descendants appear to support speculation that Katherine married Richard Marsham, and Mary subsequently married Charles Beaven.

== Lost and forgotten ==
No records exist concerning Mary Kittamaquund's death, although in 1654 Giles Brent married Frances Whitegreave Harrison, who had emigrated from England to York County, Virginia, the previous year and had been wife of the recently deceased Dr. Jeremiah Harrison. Thus it is unclear whether Mary died as a young woman (childbirth deaths being common), or whether she left Giles and resumed her (matrilineal) Native American identity, or he divorced her as discussed below. In any event, Giles and Frances either had two or no children. The last wills and testaments of Giles (d. 1671) and Margaret (d. 1663) mention Giles' six children "of which four lived," but not his wife Mary. Giles' other quasi-monastic sister Mary died in 1658.

If Mary Kittamaquund left or outlived Giles Sr. and returned to become a Piscataway matriarch, she could have moved to Brent lands in Maryland. St. Mary's Roman Catholic Church (Newport, Maryland) has a Brent family graveyard, as well as a section for burials now unknown, although the church itself was built two centuries after Kittamaquund's contact. Another more modern Catholic church near the Brent family's lands in Pomonkey, Maryland (named for another related tribe) and near Port Tobacco which became the Charles County, Maryland, county seat and a major slave trading port until it silted up also has a graveyard.

Mary also could have moved further north, for her tribe traded throughout the Chesapeake Bay region, even though it was decimated by war and disease in this era. While the oldest, continuous, English-speaking, Catholic congregation in the United States is St. Francis Xavier in St. Mary's, Maryland (which replaced its chapel in 1660 and is relatively close to Newport though not Port Tobacco), the second oldest is St. Francis Xavier Church (Warwick, Maryland) in Cecil County, Maryland. This other important trading area near the Elk Neck Peninsula allowed trade with Iroquois-speaking Susquehannocks who had a settlement near Conowingo, as well as with Delaware Valley and Delmarva Peninsula tribes (including the Algonquian-speaking Lenape and Nanticoke). Swedes established a trading post, Fort Christina, at the top of the Elk Neck peninsula near the shortest route between the Chesapeake and Delaware basins. St. Mary Anne's Episcopal Church (in northeast Maryland not far from Warwick) was founded during the early Colonial era as some of Mary's Algonquian-speaking Piscataway sold their land in Charles and St. Georges counties and moved north.

=== Black Sheep Son ===
In May 1679, Mary Kittamaquund Brent – or more probably another Mary Brent (perhaps born in Worcestershire, England, around 1650) – received the first legal marital separation in Virginia. The governor and Executive Council of Virginia issued it on the grounds of her husband's "inhumane usage", but the underlying documents are lost. Mary Kittamaquund's son, Giles Brent Jr. (ca. 1652–1679) had been arrested in 1677 for his actions in Bacon's Rebellion, especially for killing friendly Doeg Indians and (with his neighbor and friend George Mason II and about 30 militiamen) taking their land (part of which later became George Washington's estate Mount Vernon). Because Giles Brent had laid down his arms and joined Lord Berkeley's forces, he was not hanged like many other rebels. However, Giles' half-Native ancestry could have caused problems both with the rebels (some of whom wanted to kill all Indians) and with racist elements in Berkeley's faction. In any event, shortly following his divorce from Mary Brent, Giles Brent married Frances Hammersley (b. 1660 and death date unknown) of Middlesex County, but he then died within a few months. His father had patented claims for 1800 acres in his name, which had been across from the Piscataway town and later became part of Alexandria, Virginia.

=== Virginia's hidden Catholics ===
Although the English-born Brent women never married or had children, the Brents became the only publicly Catholic family in Virginia for more than a century. Mary Kittamaquund supposedly lived with Mary Brent and Margaret Brent. Rumors persisted of a Catholic church, monastery or retreat house in the area long before St. Mary's Church was founded in Alexandria, Virginia, in 1795 by George Washington's aide, Col. John Fitzgerald. Brent men continued as merchants and lawyers, and also owned and operated plantations and a quarry near the Occoquan River's junction with the Potomac. George Brent (d. 1694) became the only Catholic delegate in the House of Burgesses in colonial times (representing Stafford County in 1688), and in 1686 received title with three London partners to 30,000 acres later known as Brent town where Catholics could legally practice their religion. As anti-Catholicism grew in Virginia – both paralleling developments in the mother country as well as reflecting local conflicts with French and Spanish fur traders and their Native American allies – Brents held no further governmental positions outside their local community for nearly a century. Moreover, George Brent was forced to take cover at his law partner's house for five months in 1688 over false rumors that he was conspiring with Indians about an uprising. Nonetheless, neighbors in what became Spotsylvania County, Stafford County, Fairfax County and Alexandria, Virginia, seem to have spared successive generations of lawyer Brents from the required anti-Catholic oath. Around the time of the American Revolution, William Brent and Richard Brent married the sisters of John Carroll, a Jesuit before the brief suppression of that order, and who himself became the first native Catholic bishop in what became the United States. William Brent and Richard Brent became revolutionaries and Founding Fathers, though less noticed than Marylanders Charles Carroll and Daniel Carroll (whose first wife was William Brent's daughter Anna). In 1780, subject to an elaborate but incomplete prenuptial agreement, their 50-year-old maiden sister Sarah Brent became the second wife of George Mason, who worked to establish religious freedom in Virginia and the new nation.

=== Erased past ===
British raiders burned Brent family estates during the American Revolutionary War and War of 1812. Thus, they may have sustained more damage than their revolutionary Protestant neighbors. William Brent and Robert Brent became public servants in Washington, D.C., shortly after its founding (and at least one wrote and recorded a will to manumit his slave and allow him to retain his freedom without leaving the area, not having a large estate).

However, the Virginia Brents eventually became strong supporters of slavery and the Confederacy. They developed Brentsville, Virginia, in western Prince William County in the 1820s. Alexandria sent lawyer George William Brent (1821-1872) to the Virginia Convention of 1861, at which he argued for union in order to support slavery. During the Civil War, Union troops secured a gun emplacement on Brent property overlooking the Potomac River near Aquia creek, and vandalized the nearby Brent family graveyard, removing brass name plates. Brentsville also sustained more damage than surrounding properties during that war.

== Honors ==
- Virginia erected a historical marker to honor Mary Kittamaquund in 2009. It stands on the historic road to Richmond (Route 1), in front of the Aquia post office, about two miles south of the crucifix erected in 1930 to honor the first Catholic settlers in Virginia and Margaret Brent, as well as the later road marker honoring the same English people. A nearby plaque mentions the capture of Pocahontas when visiting the Stafford area about two decades before Mary Kittamaquund's birth.
- Lake Kittamaqundi reservoir in Columbia, Maryland, honors the tribe of which Kittamaquund's father was chief and it honors Mary, sometimes called a "princess."
