= Andrew White (Jesuit) =

English missionary in America (1579–1656)

The Reverend Andrew White SJ
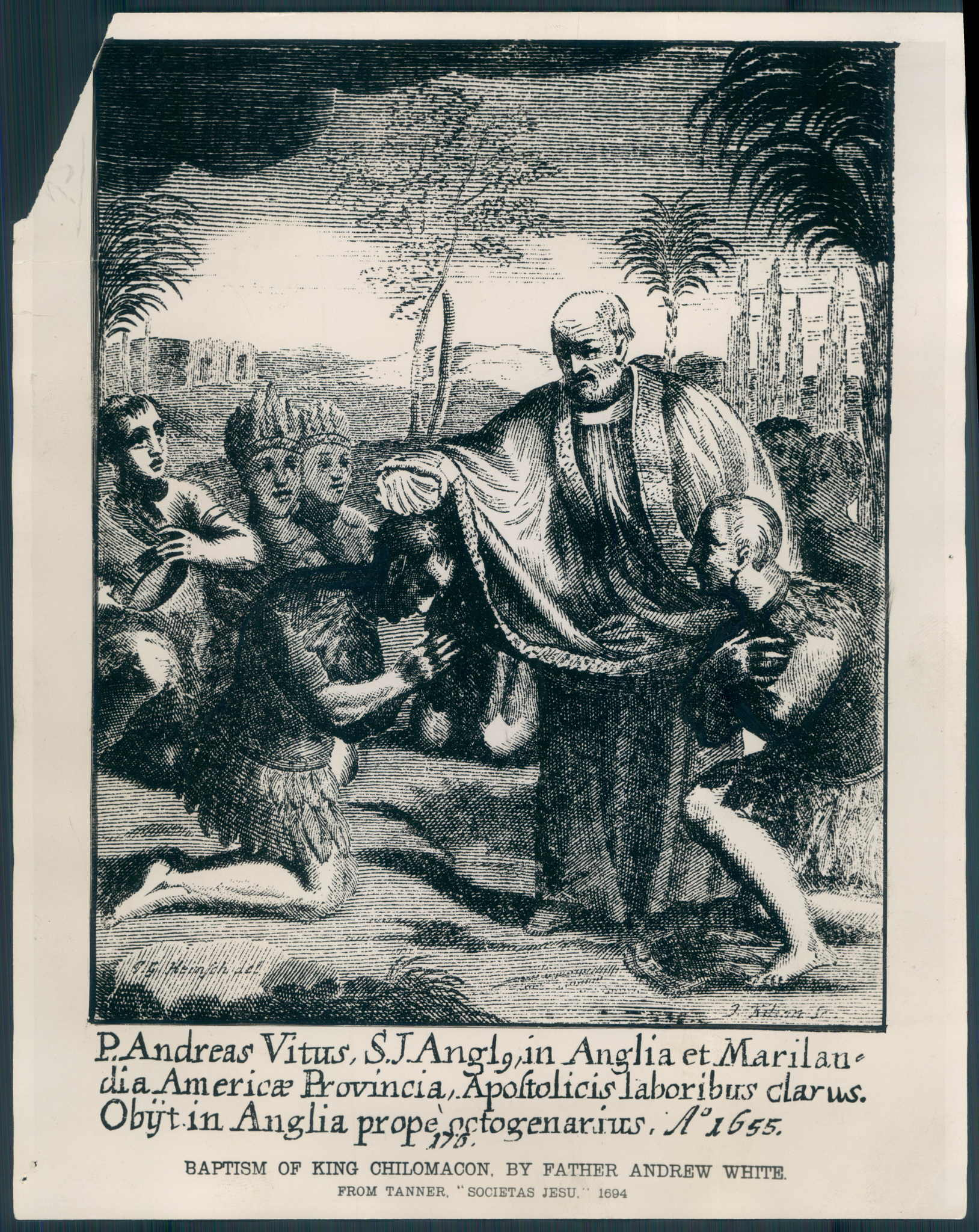
- Reverend White baptizing the chief Chitomachon

Personal details
- Born: 1579 London, Kingdom of England
- Died: December 27, 1656 (aged 76–77) Kingdom of England
- Denomination: Catholic

Andrew White SJ (1579 – December 27, 1656) was an English Jesuit Catholic missionary who was involved in the founding of the Maryland colony. A chronicler of Colonial Maryland, his writings remain a primary source on the land, the Native Americans and the Jesuit mission in North America.

For his efforts in converting and educating the Native American population, White has been frequently referred to as the "Apostle of Maryland". He is considered a forefather of Georgetown University, and is memorialized in the White-Gravenor building

== Early life in Europe ==
Andrew White was born in London in 1579 to a Catholic family. Since Catholic schools were banned in England, his family sent him at age 14 to attend the English College in Douai, France. In 1595, White went to Spain to attend the English College of St. Alban's in Valladolid. He then continued his education in Seville.

White was ordained a priest in Douai in 1605. Despite the risks to Catholic priests in England, he returned there to minister to a group of hidden Catholics. Following the 1605 Gunpowder Plot, White was arrested and in 1606 banished from England. Moving to Leuven in what was then the Spanish Netherlands, he joined the Society of Jesus on February 1, 1607.

Defying the threat of execution White returned in 1609 to preach in Southern England. He would spend the next ten years there. White made his solemn vows to the Jesuits in 1619 and they sent him to Valladolid in Spain to teach in an English novitiate that was recently established by the Jesuits. During this period, he also held positions as prefect of the seminaries at Leuven and Liège, also in the Spanish Netherlands.

After a few years in Europe, White wanted to go back to missionary work. He returned to England, where he met Sir George Calvert, the first Baron Baltimore (1579–1632). In 1625, White reportedly persuaded Calvert to convert to Catholicism. George Calvert around 1628 wrote to White from his colony on the Avalon Peninsula in Newfoundland, peaking White's interest in the new British colonies in North America. White requested permission from Superior General Mutio Vitelleschi, head of the Jesuit order, to organize a mission to the colonies. Vitelleschi approved White's request in 1629.

Cecilius Calvert (1605–1675), the Catholic son of the deceased George Calvert and the second Baron Baltimore, received a charter from King Charles I on June 20, 1632 to establish a colony in the northern Chesapeake Bay region. White wrote about he benefits of converting the Native American population. In document dated February 10, 1633, White specifically advocates Catholic settlement in "lord Baltimore's Plantation in Mary-land". He describes to potential financiers a paradisiacal land with majestic forests and fruitful soil, advertising 2,000 acres (8 km^{2}) of land for each potential settler.

== Colonization in Maryland ==
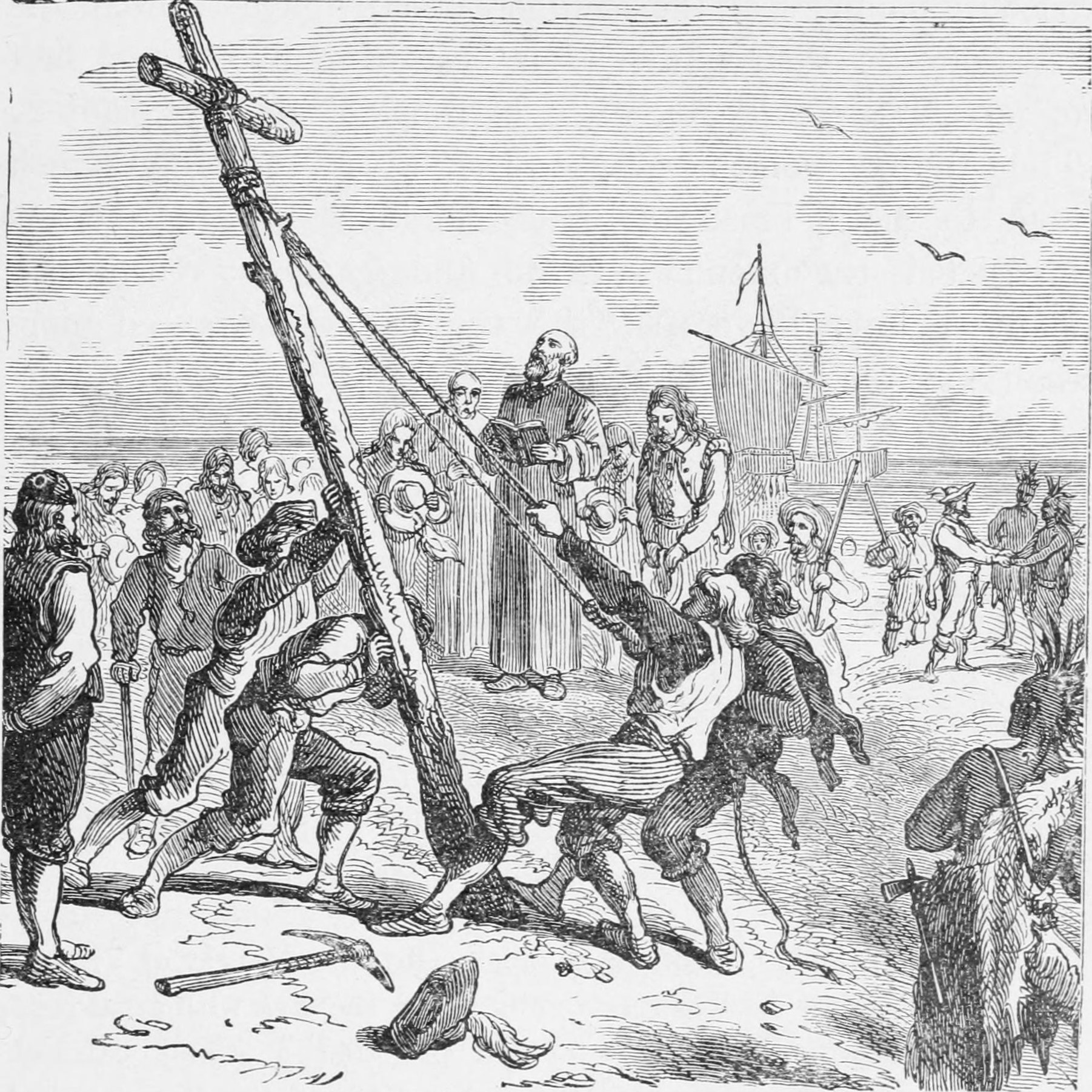
Landing of Maryland pilgrims

On November 22, 1633, White set sail from Cowes, England in a three-ship expedition to North America. Traveling with White was Lord Leonard Calvert (1606–1647), the younger brother of Cecilius Calvert (1605–1675), who was to serve as the first proprietary governor of the Maryland Colony. Two Jesuit priests, Reverends John Gravenor and Thomas Gervase, were also part of the expedition.

After a four month voyage, the three ships arrived at the Jamestown Colony to resupply. They then moved north up Chesapeake Bay. They landed on March 25, 1634, on St. Clement's Island off the north shore of the Potomac River. That day, White erected a large cross and celebrated a mass of thanksgiving. He became the first priest to celebrate a mass in the original thirteen English colonies.

In July 1634, White finished his first writing on the new colony, titled A Relation of the Sucessefull Beginnings of the Lord Baltimore's Plantation in Maryland. Sections of this article were later used to further advertise the colony in England.

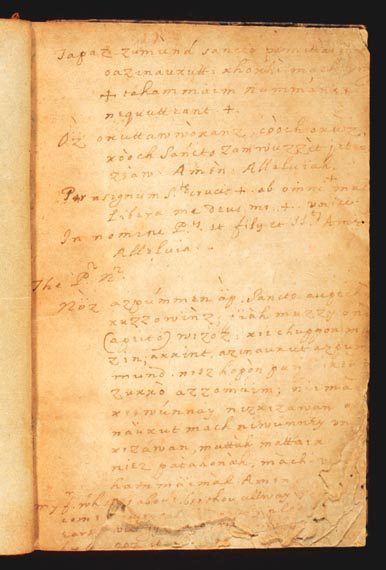
Prayers written by Reverend White between 1634 and 1640 in English, Latin, and Piscataway languages

In his "Annual Letters of the English Province", White described a conversation with Archihu, a member of the Piscataway people. White said that his intentions towards the Native Americans was;

"...not to make war, but out of good will towards them, in order to extend civilization and instruction to his ignorant race, and show them the way to heaven."

In these letters, White also recounts colonizing the land that is the present day site of St. Mary's City, Maryland. Originally, "in order to avoid every appearance of injustice" White's party "bought" the land from the Indigenous, paying in "axes, hatchets, rakes, and several yards of cloth" in exchange for "thirty miles of that land." According to White, the Yaocomico people had planned to leave the area anyway and agreed to turn over their village to the English settlers. White recounts the miracle of how the Indigenous people "[surrendered] themselves like lambs."

White spent most of the next decade in St. Mary's, working to convert Native American adults and children to Catholicism. In 1637, the Jesuits Reverend Thomas Copley and Ferdinand Poulton arrived in the colony; between 1634 and 1650, there averaged four permanent Jesuits there. To further his missionary work, White wrote dictionaries and translated the catechism into the native languages. On July 5, 1640, he famously converted Chitomachon, the chief of the Piscataway people, to Christianity. The following spring he brought his seven year old daughter Mary Kittamaquund to be educated by Governor Calvert and Margaret Brent, and in due course brought his two sons to be educated. The chief was baptized as Charles. White later baptized a daughter of the Patuxent people, along with most of her tribe.

White is also the source for one of the names of the first people of African descent to arrive in Maryland. He states that he and the other missionaries brought four "servants" into Maryland from Virginia in 1635, one of them "Francisco". A much later historian names two others as John Price and Mathias Tousa.

== Return to England ==
The beginning of the English Civil War in 1642, with its conflicts between Catholics and Protestants, ended White's mission in the Maryland Colony. In 1644, Richard Ingle, a Protestant privateer, assembled a party of Puritans who had been expelled from Jamestown and seized St. Mary's. They imprisoned the colonial leadership, looted Catholic properties and burned most of the town.

Ingle arrested White for his 'evil' preaching and sent him in 1645 to London as a prisoner. The London courts then prosecuted White for defying his 1606 banishment from England, which carried the punishment of death. He would remain in Newgate Prison until 1648, voluntarily fasting twice a week on bread and water. That year, White successfully argued that since he was transported to England by force, he had not broken the law. The court release him from prison but banned him from returning to Maryland.

When the Calvert family regained control of the Maryland Colony, White petitioned his Jesuit superiors to return there, but they denied his requests. White spent the last decade of his life living quietly in England until his death on December 27, 1656.

== Legacy ==
In 1933, the architect and writer Christopher La Farge, for the upcoming Tricentenary, 300th Anniversary of the founding of Maryland, designed a monument to White that is located just outside St. Mary's City.

Father Andrew White School in Leonardtown, Maryland was founded in 1954 and named in honor of Andrew White.

== Works ==
- A Declaration of the Lord Baltimore's Plantation in Mary-land, nigh upon Virginia: manifesting the Nature, Quality, Condition and rich Utilities it contayneth. London 1633. Facsimile ed. by Lawrence C. Wroth, Baltimore 1929.
  - Declaratio Coloniae Domini Baronis de Baltamoro in Terra Mariae prope Virginiam. qua ingenium, natura et conditio Regionis, et Multiplices Ejus Utilitates Ac Divitiae Describuntur. Compiled in Woodstock Letters 1, Bethesda 1872.
- A Relation of the Sucessefull Beginnings of the Lord Baltimore's Plantation in Maryland. Being an extract of certaine Letters written from thence, by some of the Aduenturers, to their friends in England. To which is added, The Conditions of plantation propounded by his Lordship for the second voyage intended this present yeere, 1634. London 1634. Incomplete reproduction in John D.G. Shea: Early Southern Tracts 1, New York 1965. The original manuscript version (specified as the Lechford version) first printed in The Calvert Papers, volume 3, Maryland Historical Society Fund Publications 28, 34 - 35, Baltimore 1899.
- A Relation of Maryland. London 1635.
- Objections Answered Touching Maryland. In: A Moderate and Safe Expedient to Remove Jealousies and Feares, of Any Danger, or Prejudice to This State, by the Roman Catholicks of This Kingdome, and to Mitigate the Censure of Too Much Severity towards Them, with a Great Advantage of Honour and Profit to This State and Nation. London (?) 1646.

== See also ==
- Jesuit missions in North America
