= Margaret Brent =

English-born lawyer and entrepreneur (1601–1671)

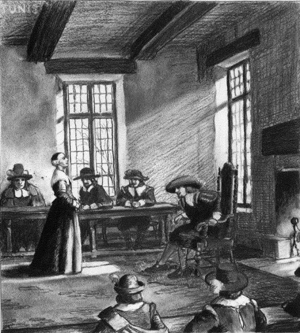
- Monochrome painting of Brent speaking to the Maryland General Assembly in St. Mary's City, c. 1934
- Born: c. 1601; Gloucestershire, England
- Died: c. May 1671 (aged 69–70); Stafford County, Colony of Virginia, English America
- Occupations: Lawyer; planter; landowner; trader; entrepreneur
- Known for: First female lawyer in North America

Signature
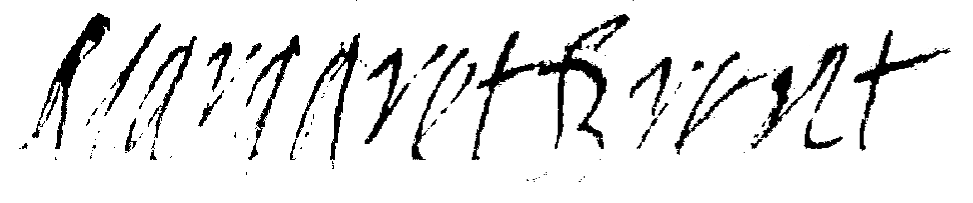

Margaret Brent (c. 1601 – c. May 1671) was an English-born lawyer, planter, landowner, trader, and entrepreneur who was a settler in the Colony of Maryland, settled in its new capital, St. Mary's City, Maryland. She was the first woman in the English North American colonies to appear before a court of the common law.

Brent was a significant founding settler in the early histories of the colonies of Maryland and Virginia. Leonard Calvert, Governor of the Maryland Colony, appointed her as the executrix of his estate in 1647, at a time of political turmoil and risk to the future of the settlement. She helped ensure soldiers were paid and given food to keep their loyalty to the colony, thereby very likely having saved the colony from violent mutiny, although her actions were taken negatively by the absentee colonial proprietor in England, Cecil Calvert, the second Lord Baltimore, and so ultimately she paid a great price for her efforts and was forced to leave the colony.

With Anne Hutchinson, Brent ranks among the most prominent female figures in early colonial American history. Hailed as a feminist by some in modern times in advancing rights of women under the laws, her insistent advocacy of her legal prerogatives as an unmarried gentlewoman of property, while notable in its exceptional energy, was consistent on paper with English law. However, in the rough, male-dominated world of the colonies, her stance for her rights and her independence was unusual in actual practice and it would have been fairly uncommon back in England in that period.

== Early life and education ==
Born in Gloucestershire, England, Margaret Brent and her siblings were all adults when they emigrated from England. She was one of six daughters (of a total of thirteen children) of the Lord of Admington and Lark Stoke, Richard Brent, and his wife Elizabeth Reed (daughter of Edward Reed, Lord of Tusburie and Witten). Although Richard Brent served as the local sheriff, and the family was at least nominally part of the Church of England, their religion and political loyalty became suspect when one daughter (Catherine) proclaimed her return to the Catholic church and emigrated to Belgium. Under the religious name Christina, she ultimately became abbess of the English convent of Our Lady of Consolation in Cambrai), and was joined by two more sisters during the drawn out religious conflicts which culminated in the English Civil War.

== Immigration to Maryland ==
Margaret, her sister Mary, and her brothers Giles Brent and Fulke Brent sailed together from England and arrived at St. Mary's, Maryland on November 22, 1638, where they hoped to improve their fortunes. In England the father's estate went to the eldest son, and the remainder of the children had to make their own ways. Margaret Brent was about 37 and unmarried.

In the colony, the Brents secured large land grants and corresponding political offices due to their prestigious ancestry and/or political affiliations. Fulke Brent returned to England, but the other three stayed on in Maryland. On October 4, 1639, Margaret Brent became the first Maryland female land owner. She obtained the first recorded land grant in St. Mary's, a 70.5-acre (285,000 m^{2}) patent, with which she and her sister Mary established the "Sisters' Freehold", and an adjacent 50 acres (200,000 m^{2}) titled St. Andrew's. The Brent sisters had land entitlement letters from Maryland's Proprietary Governor, awarding them land portions equal in size to those of arrivals in Maryland in 1634. Their initial entitlement was enlarged to 800 acres (3.2 km^{2}) per sister. Later, Giles Brent transferred a 1,000-acre (4 km^{2}) land tract on Kent Island, Maryland to Margaret as payment of a debt he owed his sister, although he may have continued to manage it himself.

Margaret Brent also received credit or headrights for the five men and four women servants she had brought with her, and additional headrights for indentured servants she later imported (some of whose indentures she sold to other colonists). The colony's Proprietor issued headrights to encourage the gentry and sea captains to transport workers for labor in the growing colony. However, records concerning her trading or exercise of the headrights are missing, whether because lost or nonexistent, given the colony's instability. Brent became an ally of the governor, Leonard Calvert. In 1641, they became the joint guardians of seven-year-old Mary Kittamaquund, the daughter of the Piscataway Tayac (chief) Kittimaquund, whose deathly ill son had recovered under the ministrations of Jesuit Rev. Andrew White. The colonists promised to educate the young girl in English language and culture. In 1644, the 38 year old Giles Brent married the 10 year old Mary Kittamaquund. Upon her father's death, he asserted his rights to tribal lands, contrary to both tribal custom and Governor Calvert's own claims.

== English Civil War comes to the Maryland colony ==
Meanwhile, by the mid-1640s, the English Civil War spilled over to Maryland. Protestant sea captain Richard Ingle raided the colony and burned down structures in early 1645. Ingle was an ally of Virginia trader William Claiborne who disputed Catholic Giles Brent's establishment of a rival trading post on Kent Island. Ingall took Acting Governor Giles Brent (who had briefly imprisoned him for high treason the previous year), and both Jesuit priests as prisoners back to England. Governor Leonard Calvert, when he returned, recruited armed men from across the Potomac River in the nearby colony of Virginia for help against the raiders. The raiders were repulsed. However, the colony had been reduced to about 100 residents, and Calvert fell sick and died before paying the mercenaries. The dying man reportedly told his sister-in-law Margaret Brent, whom he named his executrix, "Take all, spend all." Brent liquidated his estate to pay the soldiers who had saved the colony, which later caused a controversy with the governor's surviving brother, Lord Baltimore, leading to his ordering Brent and her family to leave the Maryland Colony.

Lord Baltimore had always managed his proprietorship from England, where he worked to keep political support for the colony, as well as to prove his loyalty (as a Catholic) to the new government of Protestants. He had appointed his brother as governor and to manage his lands. During the emergency after Calvert's death, the Provincial Court on January 3, 1648 appointed Brent attorney-in-fact for Lord Baltimore, as there was no time to contact him about financial matters, and he had not appointed a successor to Calvert. She collected his rents and paid his debts.

Thus, as Lord Baltimore's representative (as well as Calvert's executrix and a landowner in her own right), on January 21, 1648, Brent attended the provincial assembly, where she requested a voice in the council, as well as two votes in its proceedings (one as an independent landowner and the other as Lord Baltimore's attorney.) Margaret stated in her request to the Maryland General Assembly, "I've come to seek a voice in this assembly. And yet because I am a woman, forsooth I must stand idly by and not even have a voice in the framing of your laws." Governor Thomas Greene refused her request, as the assembly at the time considered such privileges for women to be reserved for queens. Brent left but said that she "Protested against all proceedings ... unless she may be present and have vote as aforesaid."

That same day, Brent called for corn to be brought from Virginia to feed the hungry troops camped at St. Mary's. Some accounts suggest that she had spent all of Leonard Calvert's personal estate by this time, and proceeded to sell Lord Baltimore's cattle to pay the soldiers' wages, although there is disagreement among historians on this matter. English law would not permit the sale of such possessions without a court order or a special act of the legislature. But Calvert's lands and buildings were added into the inventory of his estate. Brent and then Governor William Stone also disagreed upon the act of a sale of a 100-acre (0.4 km^{2}) land tract entitled "The Governor's Field".

Brent appeared at the assembly a final time as Lord Baltimore's attorney, on February 9, 1648 in a case against Thomas Cornwallis. She may have been replaced by Thomas Hatton, the new Provincial secretary.

From England, Lord Baltimore wrote to the assembly objecting to the sale of any of his property after the death of his brother. He may have been suspicious of Brent's motives in managing his assets, or not realized that the colony had been in danger of extinction, had the mercenaries not been paid to leave. While the assembly had refused to give Margaret Brent a vote, it defended her stewardship of Lord Baltimore's estate, writing to him on April 21, 1649, that it "was better for the Colony's safety at that time in her hands than in any man's ... for the soldiers would never have treated any others with that civility and respect ...".

== Move to Virginia ==
Given Lord Baltimore's (and Governor Stone's) hostility to the Brent family, Giles and his young wife Mary moved to Chopawamsic Island in the Potomac River in 1649, then to Virginia's Northern Neck in 1650. The two sisters, Margaret and Mary Brent, also bought Virginia land starting in 1647, and they moved by 1650. They lived on a plantation called "Peace" in what was then Westmoreland County, Virginia. No records exist of her practice as an attorney in Virginia, but records do exist of her sagacious land investments, including in what during the following century became Old Town Alexandria, Virginia and Fredericksburg, Virginia, as well as George Washington's Mount Vernon. Margaret Brent also held festive annual court leets for her people.

Neither she nor her sister Mary ever married; they were among the very few unmarried English women of the time in the Chesapeake colony, when men outnumbered women there by 6:1 (but most were lower class indentured workers). Historian Lois Greene Carr believes the two sisters had taken vows of celibacy under Mary Ward's Institute in England.

In 1658 Mary Brent died, leaving her entire estate of 1000 acres (4 km^{2}) to her sister. In 1663 Margaret Brent wrote her will. In 1670 she assigned one half of her 2,000 acres (8 km^{2}) in Maryland to her nephew, James Clifton. Most of the remainder went to her brother Giles and his children. She died at "Peace", in the newly created Stafford County, Virginia in 1671. Her will was admitted into probate on May 19, 1671. In 1687, King James II granted 30,000 acres of land in Stafford County to her great-nephew George Brent (the only Catholic ever elected to the House of Burgesses) and three London residents and specifically allowed freedom of religion to the tract's residents.

Exact dates of Margaret Brent's birth and death are not known, in part because Brent family estates were burned by British raiders in the American Revolutionary War and War of 1812. Furthermore, Union troops vandalized the Brent family graveyard (on George Brent's property) during the Civil War. The remaining gravestones were documented by a WPA historian, and the property acquired and preserved by a local church.

== Legacy and honors ==
- Margaret Brent is today seen as a "founding mother" of Maryland, alongside its "Founding Fathers".
- Margaret Brent continues to be cited by some scholars as a historical feminist figure, and alternately (and more commonly now) as instead a notable woman in American history who forwarded women's rights implicitly, rather than explicitly.
- Margaret Brent is memorialized at Historic St. Mary's City. The museum at the former site of Maryland's colonial capital features her in exhibits and explains that she did not advocate for all women's rights, only her own right to execute Lord Baltimore's estate as he intended. The St. John's site archaeology museum, located above the exposed foundations of the house where Brent appealed to the Assembly, includes an exhibit devoted to her life. The Historic St. Mary's City grounds also include a garden dedicated in memory of Brent.
- The Public Honors College, St. Mary's College of Maryland, also located in modern-day St. Mary's City, has a building named after her. It is called Margaret Brent Hall. A street on the campus is also named Margaret Brent Way. The school also maintains a scholarship and academic program for gifted and talented students from disadvantaged backgrounds called the DeSousa-Brent Scholars Program, partly named in her honor.
- In 1978, Virginia erected a historical marker in Jones Point Park commemorating Mistress Margaret Brent's fight for women's rights, as well as her ownership of the land which became Alexandria, Virginia.
- In 1991, the Margaret Brent Women Lawyers of Achievement Award was established by the American Bar Association Commission on Women in the Profession recognizing and celebrating the accomplishments of women lawyers who have excelled in their field and have paved the way to success for other women lawyers.
- In 1998, Virginia erected a historical highway marker commemorating Margaret, Giles and her sister Mary Brent for constructing the first Roman Catholic Settlement in Virginia, along historic Route 1 near the former Brent family graveyard.
- In 2010, Virginia erected a historical highway marker (about a mile south of the 1998 religious markers) noting Margaret Brent's role as guardian for Mary Kittamaquund, who was a Native American princess of the Yaocomico (Southern Maryland) branch of the Piscataway Confederacy. She had moved with the Brents to Virginia when they were forced from the Maryland colony by the second Lord Baltimore.
- Several public schools in the state of Maryland are named for her, such as Margaret Brent Middle School.
- In 2004, Stafford County, Virginia opened Margaret Brent Elementary School.
- Margaret Brent was named a member of the inaugural class of Virginia Women in History in 2000. In 1985 she was one of the first group of women inducted into the Maryland Women's Hall of Fame.

== See also ==
- List of first women lawyers and judges in the United States
- List of women in the Heritage Floor
- List of American women's firsts
