= Piscataway people =

Native American ethnic group

Kinwaw Paskestikweya
- Maryland Indigenous tribal areas prior to European arrival

Regions with significant populations
- Canada (Ontario) (descendants) United States ( Maryland) (claimants)

Languages
- English, formerly Piscataway

Religion
- Roman Catholicism

Related ethnic groups
- Mattawoman, Patuxent, Doeg, Nanticoke, Yaocomico

The Piscataway /pɪsˈkætəˌweɪ/ pih-SKAT-ə-WAY or Piscatawa /pɪsˈkætəˌweɪ, ˌpɪskəˈtɑːwə/ pih-SKAT-ə-WAY, PIH-skə-TAH-wə, are an Indigenous people of the Northeastern Woodlands. They spoke the now extinct Algonquian Piscataway, a regional dialect similar to Nanticoke. The neighboring Haudenosaunee called them the Conoy, with whom they partly merged after a massive decline of population and rise in colonial violence following two centuries of interactions with European settlers. Some descendants of the Piscataway are citizens of the federally recognized Six Nations of the Grand River First Nation in Ontario, Canada.

In the United States, two groups that claim to be descended from the Piscataway people received state recognition as Native American tribes from Maryland in 2012: the Piscataway Indian Nation and Piscataway Conoy Tribe. Within the latter group was included the Piscataway Conoy Confederacy and Sub-Tribes and the Cedarville Band of Piscataway Indians. All these groups descend from the Western Bank of the Chesapeake, spanning across Maryland, Virginia, D.C, Pennsylvania, and West Virginia, and are primarily located in Southern Maryland. None are federally recognized as tribes.

== Name ==
The Piscataway were recorded by the English (in days before standardized spelling) as the Pascatowies, Paschatoway, Pazaticans, Pascoticons, Paskattaway, Pascatacon, Piscattaway, and Puscattawy.

They were also referred to by the names of their tributary villages: Moyaone, Accotick, or Accokicke, or Accokeek; Potapaco, or Portotoack; Sacayo, or Sachia; Zakiah, and Yaocomaco, or Youcomako, or Yeocomico, or Wicomicons.

The name "Kanawha" is also used for the Piscataway.

Related Algonquian-speaking tribes included the Anacostan, Chincopin, Choptico, Doeg, or Doge, or Taux; Tauxeneen, Mattawoman, and Pamunkey. More distantly related tribes included the Accomac, Assateague, Choptank, Nanticoke, Patuxent, Pocomoke, Tockwogh and Wicomoco.

== Language ==
The Piscataway language was part of the large Algonquian language family. Jesuit missionary Father Andrew White translated the Catholic catechism into Piscataway in 1640, and other English missionaries compiled Piscataway-language materials.

The Piscataway dialect is largely dissipating among tribal members; current efforts of the community include learning the foundation of the Algonquin language while conducting linguistic studies to revive their dialect for generations. A small number of language speakers, none being fully fluent in the Piscataway dialect, along with institutional barriers and lack of funding for linguistic studies are major challenges in revitalizing the Piscataway Language dialect.

== Geography ==
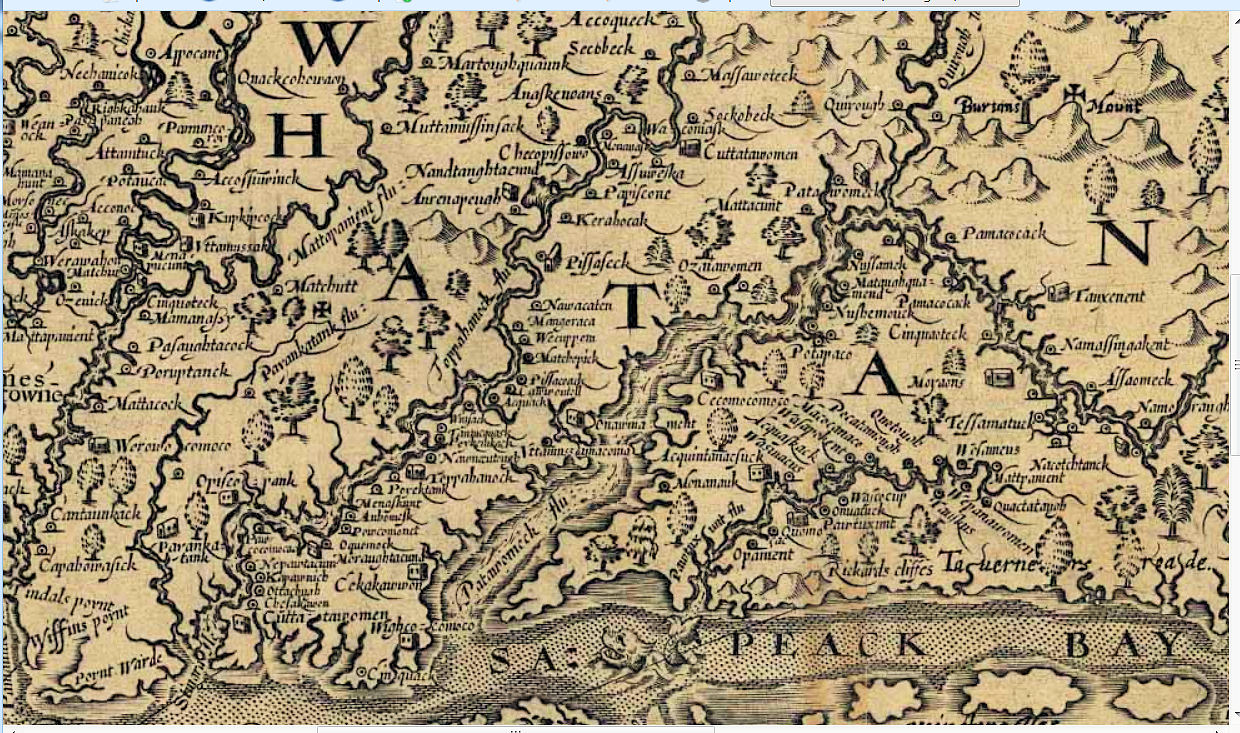
Detail of 1608 Smith Map showing the Patawomeck River

The Piscataway by 1600 were on primarily the north bank of the Potomac River in what is now Charles, southern Prince George's, and western St. Mary's counties in southern Maryland, according to John Smith's 1608 map, "wooded; near many waterways". This also notes the several Patuxent River settlements that were under some degree of Piscataway suzerainty. The Piscataway settlements appear in that same area on maps through 1700.

== Traditional culture ==
The Piscataway relied more on agriculture than did many of their neighbors, which enabled them to live in permanent villages. They lived near waters navigable by canoes. Their crops included maize, several varieties of beans, melons, pumpkins, squash and (ceremonial) tobacco, which were mainly bred and cultivated by women. Men used bows and arrows to hunt bears, elk, deer, and wolves, as well as smaller game such as beavers, squirrels, partridges, and wild turkeys. They also did fishing and oyster and clam harvesting. Women also gathered berries, nuts and tubers in season to supplement their diets.

As was common among the Algonquian peoples, Piscataway villages consisted of several individual houses protected by a defensive log palisade. Traditional houses were rectangular and typically 3 metres (10 feet) high and 6 metres (20 feet) long, a type of longhouse, with barrel-shaped roofs covered with bark or woven mats. A hearth occupied the center of the house with a smoke hole overhead.

== History ==
=== Pre-contact ===
A succession of Indigenous peoples occupied the Chesapeake and Tidewater region, arriving according to archeologists' estimates from roughly 3,000 to 10,000 years ago. Those people of Algonquian stock who would coalesce into the Piscataway nation, lived in the Potomac River drainage area since at least AD 1300. Sometime around AD 800, peoples living along the Potomac had begun to cultivate maize as a supplement to their ordinary hunting-gathering diet of fish, game, and wild plants.

The Piscataway, represented by the Potomac Creek archaeological culture, was established by Owasco Culture Algonquian-Speakers coming from the Susquehanna River Valley, and while the administrative center of the Piscataway Werowance (and later tayac) known as Moyaone was first established in 1100, their migration did not end until 1300 when the administrative center of the Werowance of Patawomeck was established.

By 1300, the Piscataway and their Algonquian tribal neighbors had become increasingly numerous because of their sophisticated agriculture, which provided calorie-rich maize, beans and squash. These crops added surplus to their hunting-gathering subsistence economy and supported greater populations. The women cultivated and processed numerous varieties of maize and other plants, breeding them for taste and other characteristics. The Piscataway and other related peoples were able to feed their growing communities. They also continued to gather wild plants from nearby freshwater marshes. The men cleared new fields, hunted, and fished.

The onset of a centuries-long "Little Ice Age" around 1300 put pressure on groups to migrate, which in turn caused conflict with local groups. One of these groups was the Montgomery Complex, in the Potomac Piedmont & Ridge and Valley. Starting from 1300, the populations moved themselves into fortified towns, likely from outside conflict with Keyser/Luray Complex peoples migration.

The Keyser/Luray Complex had migrated to the region in order to dominate the lucrative Conestoga and Carolina Paths, which intersects in the region. Chiefs, or lords, all the way in Florida would export marine shell north through these trails, to be traded with groups in the Northeast where these marine shells hold ceremonial value.

This series of wars would tighten their alliance with the neighboring Piscataway, who shared a similar material culture and likely were both members of an ancestral defensive alliance that stretched as far north as modern day Albany under the Mahican Confederation. This alliance was described to be "were so united, that whatsoever nation attacked the one, it was the same as attacking the whole." The Montgomery Complex were eventually forced to flee to the coast to their Piscataway allies in the late 14th to early 15th centuries. In order to accommodate the new immigrants, and possibly also to aid the war effort, the Potomac Complex gradually centralized rule under the existing class of hereditary elite, indicated during contact period by their copper fish headdresses. These elite were composed of Werowances, or regional chiefs, Wisos, who were held roles of priestly elders or great men and, most importantly, the Tayac, known to the English as "Emperor of Piscataway."

The first Tayac was the Talak Uttapoingassinem of the Nanticokes from across the Chesapeake Bay, another member of the ancestral defensive alliance. Likely through his power as both Talak of Nanticoke and Tayac of Piscataway (including the new Montgomery Complex immigrants), he held command over both the Patawomecks in the South and the Susquehannocks in the North. Susquehannocks were the name given by Algonquians to the residents of the Susquehanna River (which translates to "muddy river"), therefore it was likely that the Susquehannocks controlled by Uttapoingassinem were not the Iroquoian-speaking Susquehannocks encountered in historic times, but the likely Algonquian-speaking Shenks Ferry archaeological culture that predated the historic Iroquoian Susquehannocks. This is further supported by the similarity in material culture and the belief of some scholars of a migration out of Maryland being the origin of the Shenks Ferry culture. The Shenks Ferry Susquehannock might've subsumed themselves under Uttapoingassinem as a form of protection against the encroaching Andaste/Iroquoian-Speaking Susquehannock, seeing that palisades, castles and fortifications pop up among the Shenks Ferry Susquehannock around the same period a few decades after the Montgomery Complex moved in with the Piscataway (and presumably when Uttapoingassinem assumed control). Control over the Patawomecks is also supported by their own oral history which states some generations ago they were in allied union with the Piscataways.

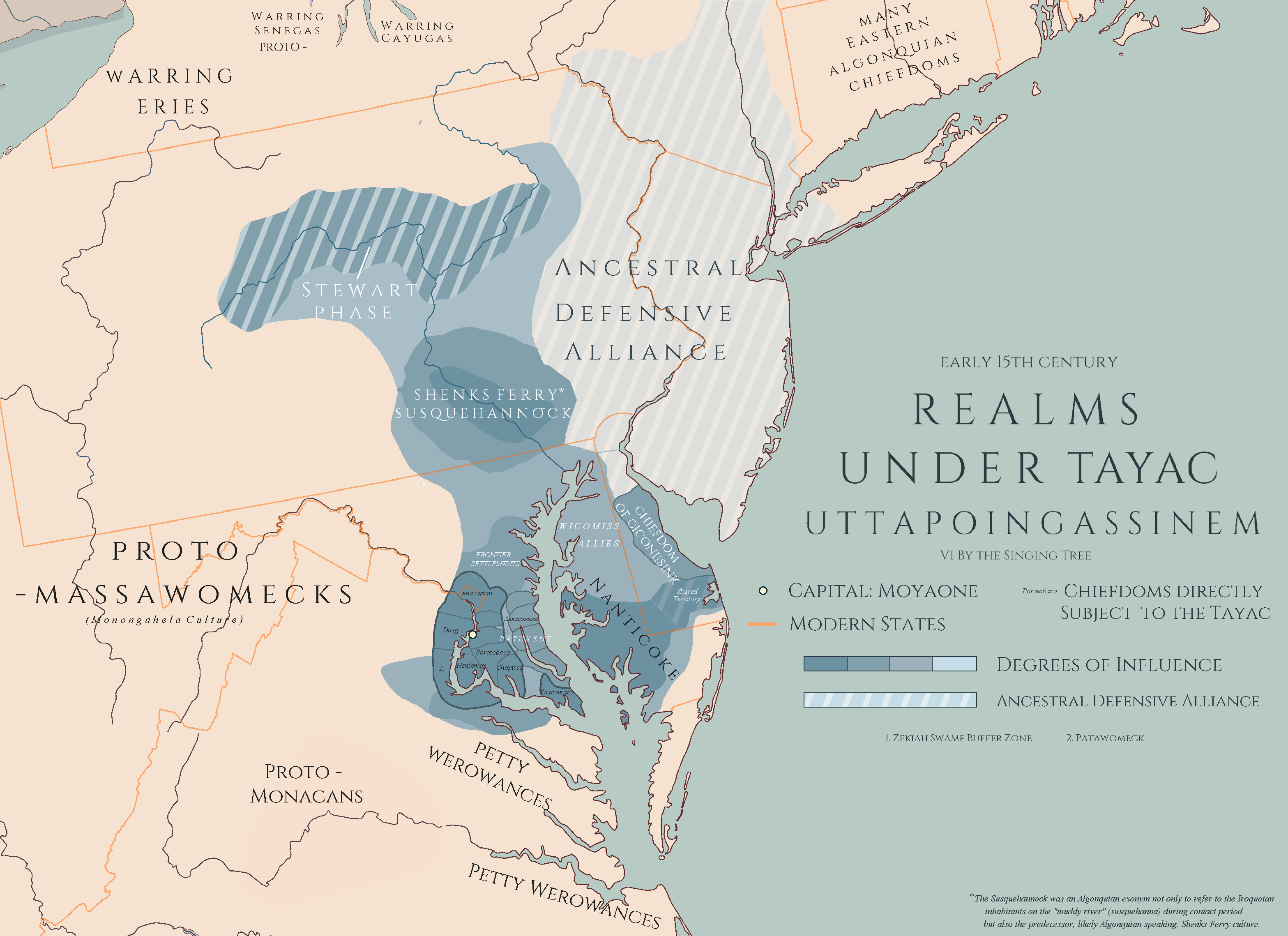
Uttapoingassinem's Confederacy in the Early 15th Century

Over time, the ties between the constituent groups of Uttapoingassinem's polity disintegrated. The Shenks Ferry Susquehannock's defense came too late; their northern sites begin to disappear a decade after the establishment of the fortifications in ~1450. They probably retreated South to create the villages of Ozinies and Tockwogh. The Patawomecks meanwhile, drifted away, 2 centuries later becoming bitter enemies of the Piscataway under their own Werowance. The Nanticoke too, likely split apart because of their patrilineal succession custom, as opposed to the Piscataway traditionally matrilineal succession. Despite this, relations remained amicable between the two "emperors," who recognize each other as family and remained in the ancestral defensive alliance.

=== 17th century and English colonization ===
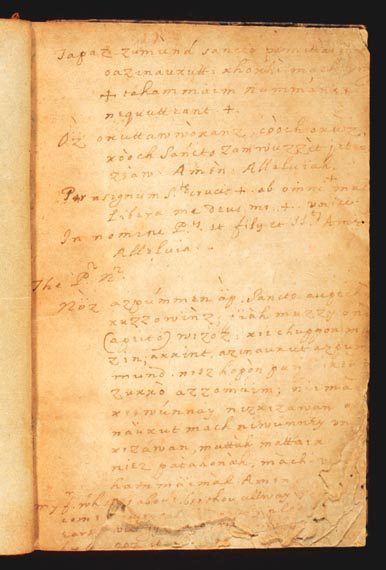
Catholic Catechism prayers handwritten in the Piscataway, Latin, and English languages by a Catholic missionary to the Piscataway tribe, Andrew White, SJ, ca. 1634–1640. Lauinger Library, Georgetown University

By 1600, incursions by the Susquehannock and other Iroquoian peoples from the north had almost entirely destroyed many of the Algonquian settlements above present-day Great Falls, Virginia on the Potomac River. The villages below the fall line survived by banding together for the common defense. They gradually consolidated authority under hereditary chiefs, who exacted tribute, sent men to war, and coordinated the resistance against northern incursions and rival claimants to the lands. A hierarchy of places and rulers emerged: hamlets without hereditary rulers paid tribute to a nearby village. Its chief, or werowance, appointed a "lesser king" to each dependent settlement. Changes in social structure occurred and religious development exalted the hierarchy. By the end of the 16th century, each werowance on the north bank of the Potomac was subject to the ruler of the Piscataway known as the Tayac.

The English explorer Captain John Smith first visited the upper Potomac River in 1608. He recorded the Piscataway by the name Moyaons, after their "king's house", i.e., capital village or Tayac's residence, also spelled Moyaone, located at Accokeek Creek Site at Piscataway Park. Closely associated with them were the Nacotchtank people (Anacostans) who lived around present-day Washington, DC, and the Taux (Doeg) on the Virginia side of the river. Rivals and reluctant subjects of the Tayac hoped that the English newcomers would alter the balance of power in the region.

In search of trading partners, particularly for furs, the Virginia Company, and later, Virginia Colony, consistently allied with enemies of the settled Piscataway. Their entry into the dynamics began to shift regional power. By the early 1630s, the Tayac's hold over some of his subordinate werowances had weakened considerably.

However, when the English began to colonize what is now Maryland in 1634, the Tayac Kittamaquund managed to turn the newcomers into allies. He had come to power that year after killing his brother Wannas, the former Tayac. He granted the English a former Indian settlement, which they renamed St. Mary's City after Queen Henrietta Marie, the wife of King Charles I.

The Tayac intended the new colonial outpost to serve as a buffer against the Susquehannock incursions from the north. Kittamaquund and his wife converted to Christianity in 1640 by their friendship with the English Jesuit missionary Father Andrew White, who also performed their marriage. Their only daughter Mary Kittamaquund became a ward of the English governor and of his sister-in-law, colonist Margaret Brent, both of whom held power in St. Mary's City and saw to the girl's education, including learning English.

At the age of 10, Mary Kittamaquund married the 38 year old English colonist Giles Brent, one of Margaret's brothers. After trying to claim Piscataway territory upon her father's death, the couple moved south across the Potomac to establish a trading post and live at Aquia Creek in present-day Stafford County, Virginia. They were said to have had three or four children together. Brent married again in 1654, so his child bride may have died young.

Benefits to the Piscataway in having the English as allies and buffers were short-lived. The Maryland Colony was initially too weak to pose a significant threat. Once the English began to develop a stronger colony, they turned against the Piscataway. By 1668, the western shore Algonquian were confined to two reservations, one on the Wicomico River and the other on a portion of the Piscataway homeland. Refugees from dispossessed Algonquian nations merged with the Piscataway.

Colonial authorities forced the Piscataway to permit the Susquehannock to settle in their territory after they were defeated in 1675 by the Haudenosaunee Confederacy. The traditional enemies eventually came to open conflict in present-day Maryland. With the tribes at war, the Maryland Colony expelled the Susquehannock after they had been attacked by the Piscataway. The Susquehannock suffered a devastating defeat.

Making their way northward, the surviving Susquehannock joined forces with their former enemy, the Haudenosaunee. Together, they returned repeatedly to attack the Piscataway. The English provided little help to their Piscataway allies. Rather than raise a militia to aid them, the Maryland Colony continued to compete for control of Piscataway land.

Piscataway fortunes declined as the English Maryland colony grew and prospered. They were especially adversely affected by epidemics of infectious disease, which decimated their population, as well as by intertribal and colonial warfare. After the English tried to remove tribes from their homelands in 1680, the Piscataway fled from encroaching English settlers to Zekiah Swamp in Charles County, Maryland. There they were attacked by the Haudenosaunee but peace was negotiated.

In 1697, the Piscataway relocated across the Potomac and camped near what is now The Plains, Virginia, in Fauquier County. Virginia settlers were alarmed and tried to persuade the Piscataway to return to Maryland, though they refused. Finally in 1699, the Piscataway moved north to what is now called Heater's Island (formerly Conoy Island) in the Potomac near Point of Rocks, Maryland. They remained there until after 1722.

=== 18th century ===
In the 18th century, the Maryland Colony nullified all Indian claims to their lands and dissolved the reservations. By the 1720s, some Piscataway as well as other Algonquian groups had relocated to Pennsylvania just north of the Susquehannah River. These migrants from the general area of Maryland are referred to as the Conoy and the Nanticoke. They were spread along the western edge of the Pennsylvania Colony, along with the Algonquian Lenape who had moved west from modern New Jersey, the Tutelo, the Shawnee and the Haudenosaunee. The Piscataway were said to number only about 150 people at that time. They sought the protection of the Haudenosaunee, but the Pennsylvania Colony also proved unsafe.

Most of the surviving tribe migrated north in the late eighteenth century and were last noted in the historical record in 1793 at Detroit, following the American Revolutionary War, when the United States gained independence. In 1793, a conference in Detroit reported the peoples had settled in Upper Canada, joining other Native Americans who had been allies of the British in the conflict. Today, descendants of the northern migrants live on the Six Nations of the Grand River First Nation reserve in Ontario, Canada.

Some Piscataway moved south toward the Colony of Virginia and the Province of North Carolina, where they merged with various tribes including the Meherrin and the remaining Tuscarora people who had not yet moved north to the Six Nations of the Grand River in Ontario. 30 Piscataway people were counted in a 1779 census taken at Fort Niagara. In the 21st century, some documented descendants of the Piscataway who moved north to Canada are among the citizens of the Six Nations of the Grand River First Nation.

== Brandywine people ==
In the 19th century, census enumerators classified most of the Brandywine people as "free people of color", "Free Negro" or "mulatto" on state and federal census records, largely because they had both African and European ancestry.

=== State-recognized tribes ===
Phillip Sheridan Proctor, legally changed to Turkey Tayac, was born in 1895. For his new surname, Proctor used the title tayac, a hereditary office which he said had been handed down to him. Proctor/Tayac was instrumental in supporting the American Indian Movement and Native American identity among the Brandywine people and among other mixed-race groups in the Mid-Atlantic and Southeast. Proctor/Tayac was a prominent figure in the early and mid-twentieth century cultural revitalization movements. His leadership inspired other groups and revival movements have also occurred among other Southeastern mixed-race communities. These include the Lumbee, Delaware Moors, and Powhatan Renape Nation of the Atlantic coastal plain.

There are still Indian people in southern Maryland, living without a reservation in the vicinity of US 301 between La Plata and Brandywine. They are formally organized into several groups, all bearing the Piscataway name.

After Proctor/Tayac died in 1978, the Piscataway split into three groups (outlined below): the Piscataway Conoy Confederacy and Subtribes (PCCS), the Cedarville Band of Piscataway Indians, and the Piscataway Indian Nation. The official burying of Proctor/Tayac was filled with tribal tension and drove a great wedge that still exists among them today. Despite having been granted congressional permission to bury Proctor/Tayac on their ancestral lands located at Piscataway Park of National Park Service, various tribal citizens celebrated the death by spitting, dancing, and singing over Proctor/Tayac's gravesite; some sought to immediately claim chiefdom over the community; others wished to focus on Piscataway Tribal Issues and not pan-Indian movements.

In response, the following groups were formed:

- Piscataway Conoy Tribe, which is split between two tribal entities:
  - Piscataway Conoy Confederacy and Sub-Tribes
  - Cedarville Band of Piscataway Indians.
- Piscataway Indian Nation and Tayac Territory headed by Billy Redwing Tayac, Indigenous rights activist and son of the late Chief Turkey Tayac.

These three groups continue to disagree over a number of issues: seeking state and federal tribal recognition, developing casinos on their land if recognition were gained, determining which individuals are legitimately Piscataway, and if the Piscataway can once again unite or even work together.

In the late 1990s, after conducting an exhaustive review of primary sources, a Maryland-state appointed committee, including a genealogist from the Maryland State Archives, validated the claims of core Piscataway families to Piscataway heritage. A fresh approach to understanding individual and family choices and self-identification among American Indian and African-American cultures is underway at several research universities. Unlike during the years of racial segregation, when all people of any African descent were classified as black, new studies emphasize the historical context and evolution of seventeenth, eighteenth, nineteenth, and twentieth century ethnic cultures and racial categories. The State of Maryland appointed a panel of anthropologists, genealogists, and historians to review primary sources related to Piscataway genealogy. The panel concluded that some contemporary self-identified Piscataway descended from the historic Piscataway.

In 1996 the Maryland Commission on Indian Affairs (MCIA) suggested granting state recognition to the Piscataway Conoy Confederacy and Subtribes. Critics were concerned about some of the development interests that backed the Piscataway Conoy campaign and feared gaming interests. (Since the late twentieth century, many recognized tribes have established casinos and gaming entertainment on their reservations to raise revenues.) Gov. Parris Glendening, who was opposed to gambling, denied the tribe's request.

Their claim to Piscataway heritage was challenged by sociologist Thomas Brown, wherein he stated their narrative of separateness from African-Americans was false, noting the group intermarrying with Black people before the Civil War, later developing a separate identity from freedmen during Jim Crow to obtain separate institutions. In 2004, Governor Bob Ehrlich also denied the Piscataway Conoy's renewed attempt for state recognition, stating that they failed to prove that they were descendants of the historical Piscataway Indians, as required by state law. Throughout this effort, the Piscataway-Conoy stated they had no intent to build and operate casinos.

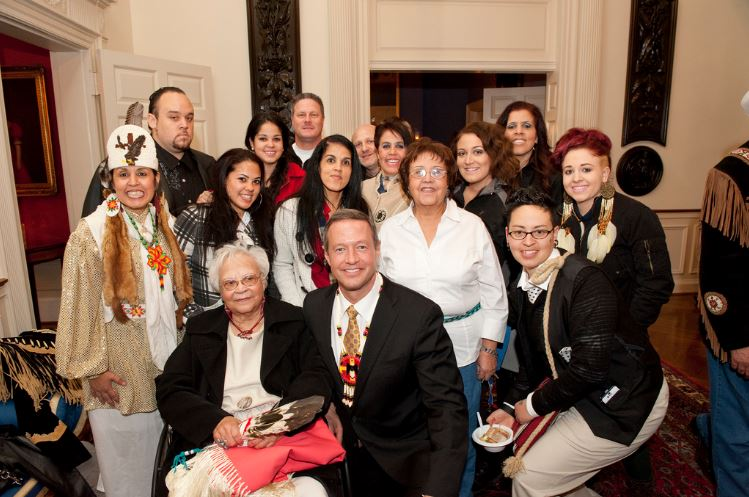
The Cedarville Band, Wild Turkey Clan, of the Piscataway Conoy Nation, at the 2012 recognition ceremony held in Annapolis, Maryland.

In December 2011, the Maryland Commission on Indian Affairs stated that the Piscataway had provided adequate documentation of their history and recommended recognition. On January 9, 2012, Gov. Martin O'Malley issued executive orders recognizing all three Piscataway groups as Native American tribes. As part of the agreement that led to recognition, the tribes renounced any plans to launch gambling enterprises, and the executive orders state that the tribes do not have any special "gambling privileges". Remaining debates include the legality of disenfranchising community rights to "gambling privileges" made in exchange, and the announcement of an MGM Casino in the National Harbor made shortly after the tribe's state recognition.

== Notable Piscataway ==
Historical

- Wannas (c.1634), Tayac who met the first colonial settlers of Maryland. When settlers asked to be welcomed onto Piscataway Lands, his response to English Lord Calvert was "‘…that he would not bid him goe, neither would hee bid him stay, but that he might use his own discretion.”
- Kittamaquund (c. 1634), Succeeded to be the Tayac after murdering his brother, Wannas, made in agreement with colonial settlers. The first Piscataway to convert to Christianity.
- Mary Kittamaquund (c. 1634–c. 1654/1700), daughter of tribal leader, Kittamaquund. Given the name of Mary upon her family converting to Christianity. Married an English settler and moved to England.

Modern

- Turkey Tayac (Phillip Sheridan Proctor) (1895–1978), 20th century tribal leader, activist, and herbal doctor. Claims to be descendant of Kittamaquund, changing his given and tribal family names from Phillip Sheriden Proctor to Turkey Tayac.
- Gabrielle Tayac, historian and curator

== See also ==
- Piscataway-Conoy Tribe of Maryland
- Piscataway Indian Nation and Tayac Territory
- List of Maryland placenames of Native American origin
- Nanjemoy
- Shelbi Nahwilet Meissner
