= Thomas Greene (governor) =

Colonial Governor of Maryland

Governor Thomas Greene Esquire

2nd Proprietary-Governor of Maryland
- In office 9 June 1647 – 26 April 1649
- Preceded by: Leonard Calvert
- Succeeded by: William Stone

Personal details
- Born: c. 1610 Bobbing Manor, Bobbing, Kent, England
- Died: by 20 January 1652 (aged 41–42) St. Mary's County, Maryland
- Resting place: St. Mary's County, Maryland
- Spouse: Ann Cox Winifred Seybourne

Thomas Greene (b. c. 1610) was an early settler of the Maryland colony and the 2nd Proprietary Governor of Maryland from 1647 to 1648.

== Biography ==
Greene was born in Bobbing, Kent, England in 1610. He was the son of Sir Thomas Greene and Lady Margaret Webb. His father was created Knight Bachelor of the Realm by James I in 1622 at Windsor Castle.

Thomas came over from England on the Ark and Dove expedition in 1634. Greene was among the earliest settlers of the colony after its founding in 1634 as a haven of religious tolerance for English Catholics among other groups. He was already prominent in the politics of the colony by 1637 or 1638, when he became a prominent leader of moderate Catholics. More radical Catholics led by Thomas Cornwaleys resisted attempts by the colony's proprietor, Cecilius Calvert, 2nd Baron Baltimore to ensure a broader religious tolerance by, for example, restricting the activities of the Jesuits. Greene and others voted against some of these measures, but despite pressure from Cornwaleys and the Jesuits accepted the laws once they were passed.

In 1647, Greene was appointed to the governorship by the colony's first governor, Leonard Calvert, as an emergency measure only hours before Calvert's death due to a sudden illness. He was by this point one of the few early settlers still active in colonial leadership. Some, such as Leonard Calvert, had died and some, such as Thomas Cornwaleys, had returned to England. Greene, who had been a member of the colonial council prior to his appointment and was familiar with the issues confronting the colonial government, quickly set about strengthening the colonial militia in response to threats from the Nanticoke and Wicocomico tribes of Native Americans. Among his actions was the payment of arrears to soldiers at St. Inigoe's Fort as well as appointment of John Price as the new commander of colonial militia. These were necessary steps given that the colonial militia had been severely taxed during armed conflict with Virginian William Claiborne and his allies during the previous three years. Greene also appointed a number of Catholics to government offices, but was unable to build Catholic influence in the colony and suffered severe political setbacks when the Protestant-dominated colonial assembly passed legislation unfavorable to the proprietary government.

By 1648, Cecilius Calvert replaced him with William Stone. Greene was a Catholic and a royalist, and some historians have speculated that Stone, a Protestant and supporter of Parliament, was appointed in his place to appease the Protestant majority in the colony. Following his removal from office, Greene served as Deputy Governor under Stone. In November 1649, while Stone was in neighbouring Virginia, Greene used this position to publicly declare Maryland in support of Prince Charles, the heir to the English throne. Earlier that year, the Prince's father, King Charles I, had been executed by the mainly Puritan Parliamentarians in the culminating event of the English Civil War. Stone quickly returned and retracted the declaration, but the event was enough to convince Parliament to appoint Protestant commissioners Richard Bennett and William Claiborne to help oversee the colony. Bennett and Claiborne appointed a Protestant council to oversee the colony, creating some confusion as to whether this council of the proprietary governor and his deputies was in charge. The council, among other decisions, rescinded the Maryland Toleration Act which had guaranteed religious freedom in the colony and banned Catholics from worshiping openly. Stone attempted to regain control of the colony by force, but was defeated in the Battle of the Severn.

Greene died in St. Mary's County, Maryland shortly before 20 January 1652.

== Ancestry ==
The Greene family of Maryland did not descend from the Green family of Green's Norton, Northamptonshire, but rather through the illegitimate child of Sir John Norton of Northwood, Sir Thomas Norton who took on the alias Greene; hence the descendants surname of Greene. He was descended from Nicholas de Norton, who lived in the reign of King Stephen, and was possessed of much land in the neighbourhood of Norton and Faversham, as appeared by the chartulary of the monastery of St. Augustine.

Governor Thomas Greene was the son of Sir Thomas Greene of Bobbing Kent and Margaret Webb of Frittenden, Kent, England. Gov. Thomas had three brothers; Jerimiah Greene, John Greene, and the Hon. Robert Greene, Lord of Bobbing Manor who had joined his brother in Maryland for a time, but returned to England as the eldest son to inherit his father's property. Governor Greene's father, Sir Thomas, was created a Knight Bachelor of the Realm by King James I on 5 September 1622. at Windsor Castle in Berkshire, England.

Sir Thomas Greene's father was Sir Robert Green of Bobbing Kent who married Frances Darrel, daughter of Thomas Darrel of Scotney. Sir Robert was the son of Sir Thomas Norton alias Greene and his wife Alice Heveningham, daughter of Sir George Heveningham. George, by his mother Alice Bruyn, was a first cousin of Charles Brandon, 1st Duke of Suffolk. Sir Thomas was the illegitimate child of Sir John Norton of Northwood through whom the family descended. Between 1536 and 1541, Sir Thomas Norton Greene was granted royal favours by Henry VIII. During the dissolution of the monasteries the rectory at Bobbing Manor along with "all manors, messuages, glebe, tithes and hereditaments in the parishes and fields of Bobbing, Iwade, Halstow, and Newington" were granted to him by the King.

Sir John Norton of Northwood's wife was Joan Northwood, co-heiress with her brother to the estates of John Northwood, Esq. Sir John Norton's father was Sir Reginald Norton of Lee's Court in Sheldwich, Kent who married Katherine Dryland of Cooksditch in Faversham, Kent, England.

== Lees Court ==
Sir Reginald's grandfather Sir John Norton married Lucy At-Lese. It was through her that their descendants came into the possession of Lees Court alias Sheldwich, some of whom lie buried at Faversham. The property of Lees Court which seems to have comprehended the manor of Sheldwich, became the property of that family during the reign of Edward I. From their residence at the Lees, the family assumed the name of At-Lese, their mansion here being called Lees-court, a name which this manor itself soon afterwards adopted, being called THE MANOR OF LEESCOURT, alias SHELDWICH. It was the previously mentioned Sir John Norton of Northwood who alienated this manor to Sir Richard Sondes, of Throwley, whose son Sir George Sondes, K. B. succeeding him in it, pulled down a great part of the old mansion of Lees-court, soon after the death of King Charles I. He then completed the present mansion of Lees-court, the front of which is built after a design of Inigo Jones, to which he afterwards removed from the ancient mansion of his family at Throwley. The current court was inherited and is currently inhabited by Phyllis Kane, Countess Sondes, wife of the former Henry George Herbert, 5th Earl Sondes Milles-Lade who died in 1996.

== Marriage and issue ==
In 1634, the Hon. Thomas Greene married Anne Cox. Author Harry Newman states that "Mistress Ann Cox" was one of the few "gentlewomen" on the initial voyage of the Ark and the Dove that sailed from England to Maryland. In a footnote he states: "Mistress was a title of Courtesy and respect and was the 17th century style of addressing unmarried ladies of position." "Mrs. Ann Cox" received a special grant of 500 acres (2.0 km^{2}) of land from Lord Baltimore in 1633. Thomas and Anne were wed in 1634 on the banks of the St. George River. Their marriage was considered to have been the first Christian marriage performed in Maryland and had issue.

- Thomas Greene (1635 – c. 1665)
- Leonard Greene (1637–1688). Married Anne Clark and had issue. Leonard's godparent was Leonard Calvert. Their daughter Mary married Francis Marbury.

Thomas married Mistress Winifred Seybourne [Seaborne] (b. abt 1610, England) on 2 April 1643 and had issue. Mistress Winifred Seybourne emigrated to Maryland in 1638 who by her title indicated gentle birth and likewise one who arrived to the age of discretion to be recognised as a femme sole in matter of ethics and business. On 30 July 1638, she received 100 acres for transporting herself and another 100 for transporting Mistress Troughan. She emigrated, that is, financed her own passage thus indicating a lady of means.

- Robert Greene (1646–1716)
- Francis Greene (1648–1707)

A third wife is often cited for Thomas Green, Millicent Browne. There is a Thomas and Millicent Green residing in Stafford County Virginia a few years after the death of Governor Thomas Green, therefore, Millicent Browne was not another wife of this Thomas.

The house Green's Inheritance was built by Francis Caleb Green, on part of the 2,400 acres (9.7 km^{2}) of land granted in 1666 to the sons of Thomas Greene, the second Provincial Governor of Maryland. It was listed on the National Register of Historic Places in 1977.

== Burial ==
In 2026, it was announced that the graves of The Governor, his wife Anne, and son Leonard were possibly found in St. Mary’s.

Political offices
Preceded by Leonard Calvert	Provincial Governor of Maryland; 1647–1649	Succeeded by William Stone
