= Maryland Day =

Holiday in Maryland, US

- Maryland State Seal
- Observed by: Maryland
- Type: Local, Historical
- Significance: Anniversary of first colonists landing at St. Clement's Island
- Date: March 25
- Next time: March 25, 2027
- Frequency: annual
- Related to: Feast of the Annunciation

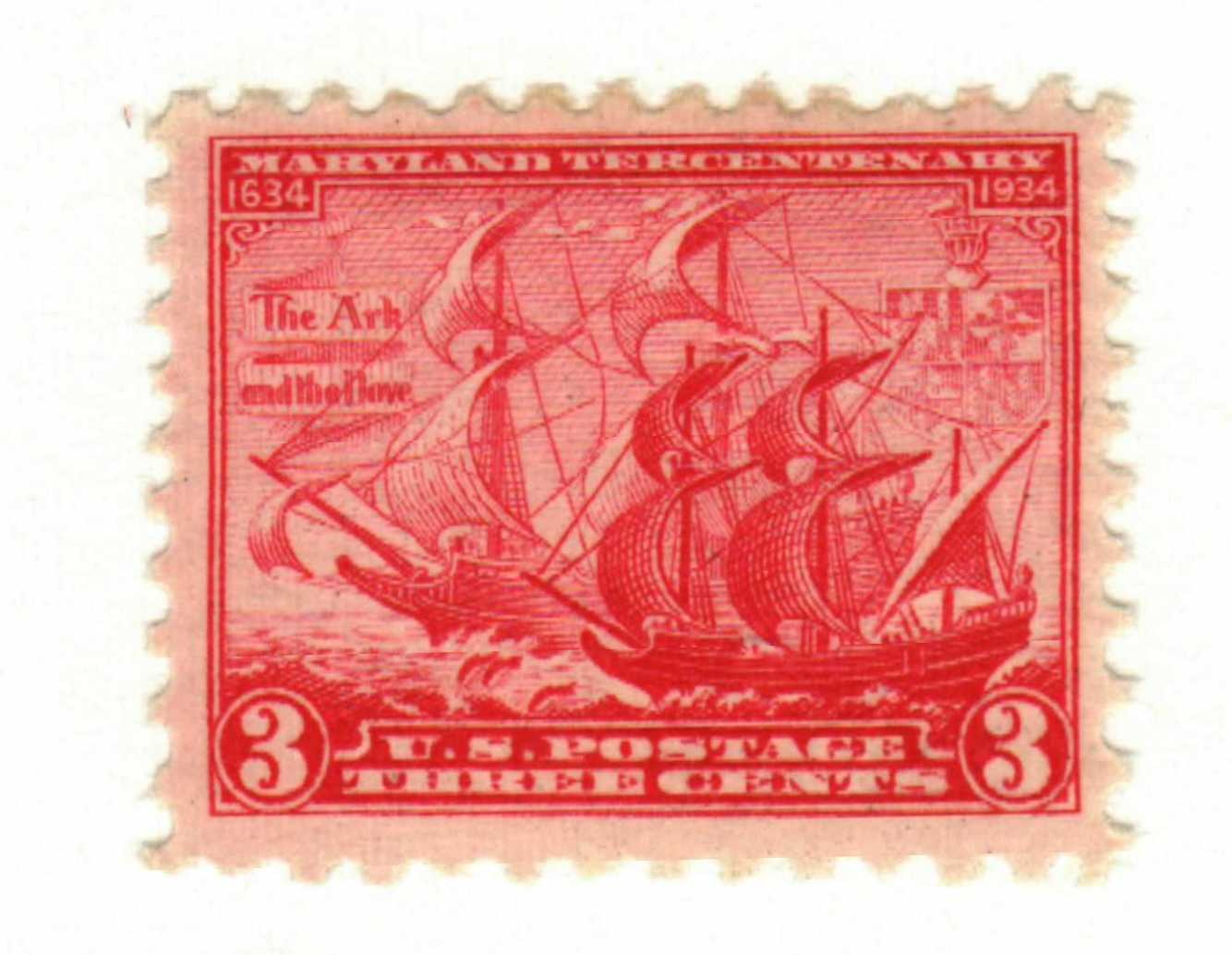
The Ark and the Dove, 1934 Issue

Maryland Day is a legal holiday in the U.S. state of Maryland.

== History ==
It is observed on the anniversary of the March 25, 1634, landing of the first European settlers in the Province of Maryland, the third English colony to be settled in British North America. On this day settlers from The Ark and The Dove first set foot onto Maryland soil, at St. Clement's Island in the Potomac River. The settlers were about 150 in number, departed from Gravesend on the Thames River downstream from London. Three Jesuit priests were collected from Cowes on the Isle of Wight in England where they avoided having to give the oath of allegiance and supremacy to the King. The colony's grant was renewed to Cecil Calvert, 2nd Baron Baltimore, (1605-1675), two years prior by Charles I of England, after first being given to his father Sir George Calvert, 1st Baron Baltimore, (1574-1632), along with the title of "Lord Baltimore", and a first grant of the Province of Avalon, in the Newfoundland Colony, (modern Newfoundland and Labrador, Canada), (title named after lands and town Baltimore, in Ireland) who had served the King in many official and personal capacities as Secretary of State, 1619-1625 (despite his conversion to Roman Catholicism). In thanksgiving for the safe landing, Jesuit Father Andrew White celebrated the Mass for the colonists led by the younger brother of Lord Baltimore, Leonard Calvert, (1606-1647), who served as the first colonist ruler of the English landing at Blackistone Island, later known as St. Clement's Island off the northern shore of the Potomac River, which was the new border between the new colony and the earlier English settlements in Virginia) and erected a large cross. The landing coincided with the Feast of the Annunciation, a holy day honoring Mary, and the start of the new year in England's legal calendar (prior to 1752). Maryland Day on 25 March celebrates the 1634 landing at St Clements. Later the colonists and their two ships sailed further back down river to the southeast to settle a capital at St. Mary's City near the point where the Potomac flows into the Chesapeake Bay.

The holiday began its official observance in 1903, the date chosen by the State's Board of Education to honor Maryland history and to increase the teaching of state and local histories in the public schools. In 1916, the General Assembly (state legislature) authorized "Maryland Day" as a legal holiday (Chapter 633, Acts of 1916).

Ceremonies, activities, historical pageants and other commemorative events are held annually in Historic St. Mary's City in St. Mary's County, the first colonial capital of the province and the site of several reconstructed provincial and colonial structures including the first State House with a tourism/historical agency which runs operations and provides interpretative information. This was where the first sessions of the General Assembly of Maryland were held, over 375 years ago.

An annual ceremony is held at the base of the 1908 statue of Cecilius Calvert, 2nd Baron Baltimore, (1605-1675), on the steps of the west front of the Baltimore City Circuit Courthouse (renamed 1985 after national civil rights leader Clarence M. Mitchell, Jr., 1911–1984) facing St. Paul Street with the ceremony continuing further inside in a ceremonial courtroom.

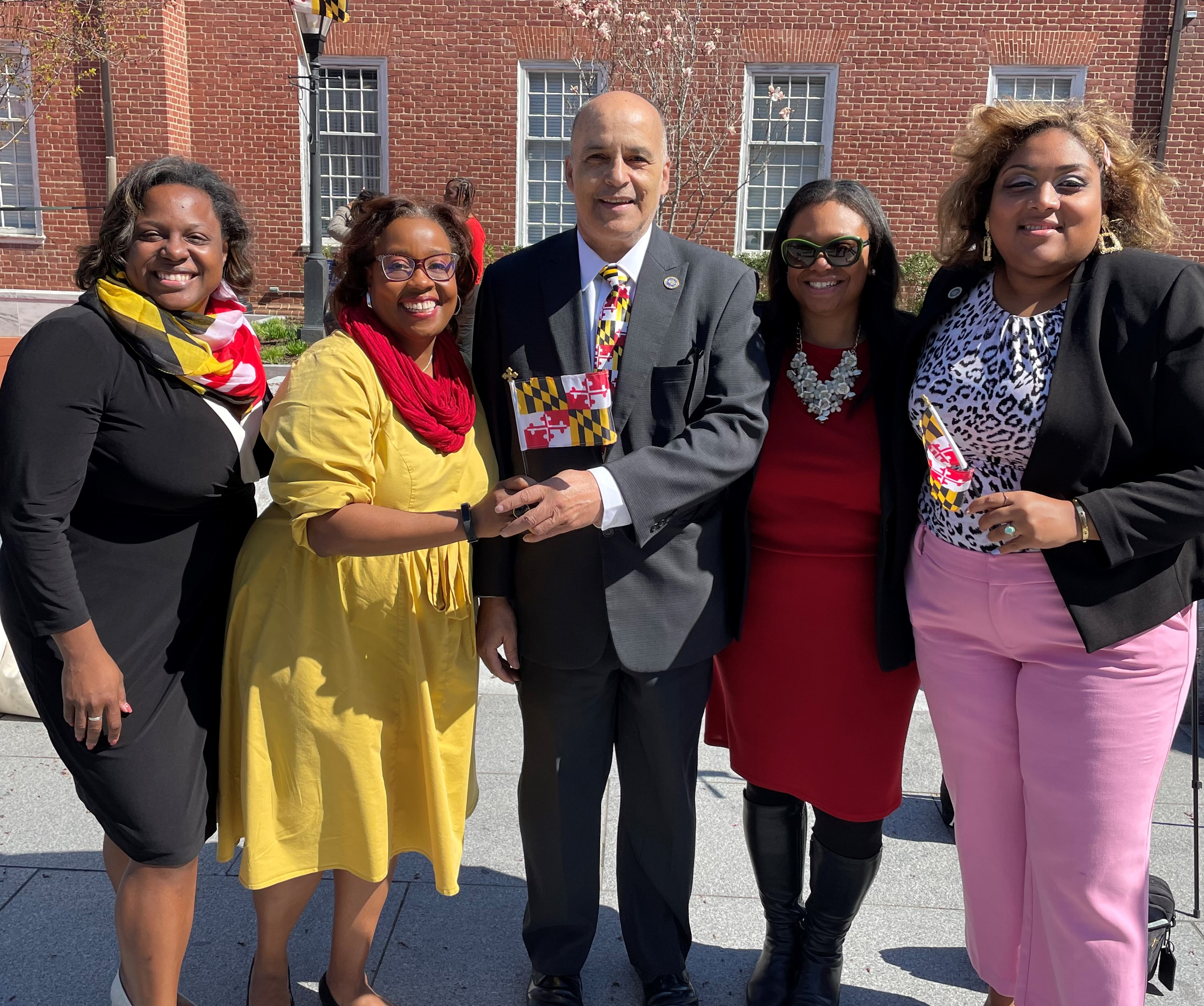
Delegates Jones, Williams, Anderson, Toles and Fisher celebrate Maryland Day 2022 at Lawyers Mall in Annapolis Maryland

The annual Maryland Day weekend celebration is held in the Four Rivers Heritage Area of Maryland (from the State Capital in the City of Annapolis to Southern Anne Arundel County). This Maryland Day celebration highlights Maryland's history, heritage, culture and environment at approximately 20 sites with over 40 events during Maryland's Birthday weekend.

The 2020 Maryland Day celebration was cancelled due to the coronavirus pandemic.
