= Leonard Calvert =

English-born colonial administrator (1606-1647)

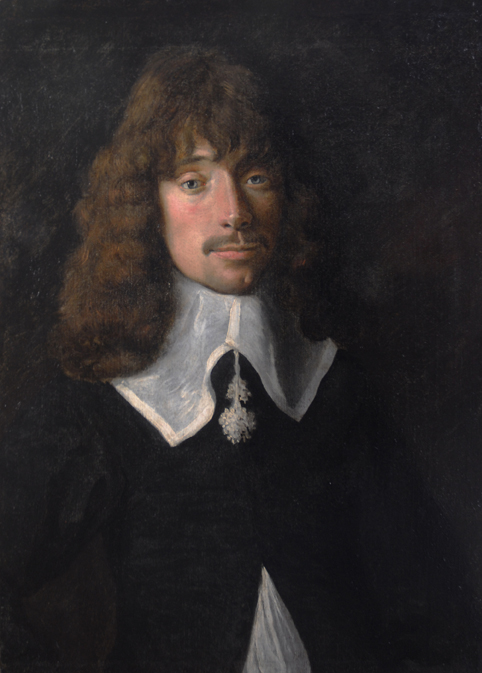
- Portrait by Jacob van Oost or Jacob van Oost the Younger, c. 1640

Proprietary governor of Maryland
- In office 1634–1647
- Preceded by: Office established
- Succeeded by: Thomas Greene

Personal details
- Born: c. 1606 England
- Died: 9 June 1647 (aged 40–41) Maryland
- Children: William; Anne
- Parent(s): George Calvert, 1st Baron Baltimore (father) and Anne Mynne (mother)
- Occupation: Placeman, planter
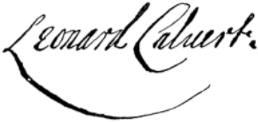
- Signature

Leonard Calvert (c. 1606 – 9 June 1647) was an English-born colonial administrator who served as the first proprietary governor of Maryland from 1634 to 1647. He was the second son of George Calvert, 1st Baron Baltimore, the first lord proprietor of the Province of Maryland. His elder brother Cecil, who inherited the colony and the title upon the death of their father in 1632, appointed Leonard as governor of Maryland in his absence.

== Early life ==
Leonard Calvert was born in England to George Calvert, 1st Baron Baltimore and his wife Anne Mynne, and was named in honor of his paternal grandfather, Leonard Calvert of Yorkshire.

== Colonisation of Newfoundland ==
In 1625, when Calvert's father was created Lord Baltimore and received letters patent for the creation of a Province of Avalon in the island of Newfoundland from James I of England, he relocated part of his newly converted Catholic family to Newfoundland.

Leonard Calvert accompanied his father to the new colony of Newfoundland in 1628. The colony ultimately failed due to disease, extreme cold, and attacks by the French, and the family returned to England. After a few years, Baltimore declared Avalon a failure and traveled to the Colony of Virginia, where he found the climate much more suitable and temperate, but was met with an unwelcome reception from the Virginians' government and ruling class.

== Establishment of Maryland ==
Calvert's coat of arms

In 1632, Baltimore returned to England, where he negotiated an additional patent for the colony of Maryland from King Charles I. However, before the papers could be executed, Baltimore died on April 15, 1632.

On June 20, 1632, Cecil, the second Lord Baltimore, received from the king the charter for the colony of Maryland that his father had negotiated. The charter consisted of 23 sections, but the most important conferred on Lord Baltimore and his heirs, besides the right of absolute ownership in the soil, certain powers, ecclesiastical as well as civil, resembling those possessed by the nobility of the Middle Ages. Leonard Calvert was appointed by his brother as the colony's first governor.

=== The Ark and The Dove ===
Two vessels, The Ark and The Dove, carrying over 300 settlers, sailed from the harbour of Cowes, England, on November 22, 1633, arriving at just inside the huge harbor and bay (later to be named "Hampton Roads") at the mouth of the Chesapeake Bay, between Cape Charles and Cape Henry and passed off "Point Comfort" at the mouths of the intersecting James, Nansemond, and Elizabeth Rivers, in the colony of Virginia on February 24, 1634 (also later the site of the cities of Norfolk, Portsmouth and Virginia Beach on the south side and Newport News and Hampton on the northern peninsula). After exploring the area, a few weeks later they sailed up the Potomac River, north of the Virginia shoreline and the southern border of their new colony and landed on the northern shore at Blakistone Island (later renamed St. Clement's Island) on March 25, 1634, erected a large cross, gave thanks and celebrated a Mass with Fr Andrew White who had accompanied them (later to be celebrated as "Maryland Day", an official state and local holiday). Two days later, on March 27, they returned further south down-river near the point where the Potomac meets the Bay at what is now St. Mary's City, then the site of a Native American village of the Yaocomico branch of the Piscataway tribe, whom the paramount chief had moved away to accommodate the new English settlers, so as to take advantage of the trading opportunities of their more powerful technology: industries, weapons and implements, and they began the work of establishing a settlement there.

== Governor of Maryland ==
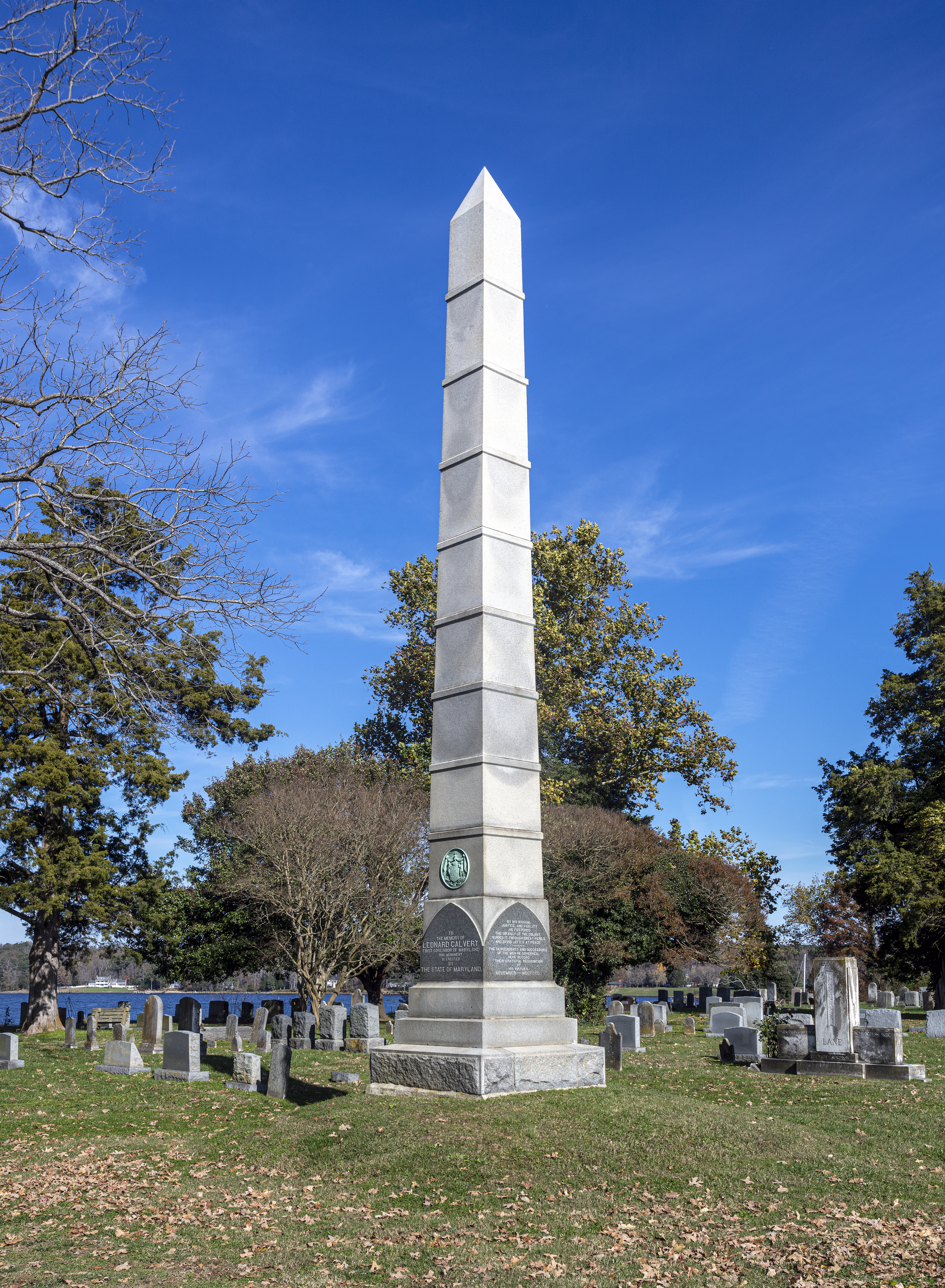
Leonard Calvert monument in St. Mary's City

Following his brother's instructions, Leonard Calvert at first attempted to govern the country in an absolutist way, but in January 1635, he had to summon a colonial assembly, which became the foundation and first session of the modern General Assembly of Maryland, the third legislature to be established in the English colonies after the House of Burgesses in the Dominion of Virginia and the General Court in the Commonwealth of Massachusetts. In 1638, the Assembly forced him to govern according to the common law of England, and subsequently the right to initiate legislation passed to the new General Assembly, representing the common "freeholders" (owners of freehold property) as subjects of the Crown.

In 1638, Calvert seized a trading post at Kent Island established by the Virginian William Claiborne. In 1643, Governor Calvert went to England to discuss policies with his brother Lord Baltimore, the proprietor, leaving the affairs of the colony in charge of acting Governor Giles Brent, his brother-in-law (he had married Ann Brent, daughter of Richard Brent). Calvert returned to Maryland in 1644 with a new wife and children (William, born in 1643, and a daughter, Anne, born in 1644). That same year, Claiborne returned and led an uprising of Maryland Protestants against the Catholic Proprietor. Calvert was soon forced to flee southward to Virginia. He returned at the head of an armed force in 1646 and reasserted proprietarial rule after three years of religious warfare had wracked the colony.

== Death and aftermath ==
Leonard Calvert died suddenly and unexpectedly of an illness on June 9, 1647 after restoring control of the colony. The nature of his illness is unknown. Before he died, he wrote a will naming Margaret Brent (the sister of Giles and a future, historically famous planter, lawyer, and women's rights advocate) as the executor of his estate as well as managing the property of Lord Baltimore in the province. Calvert also named his friend and fellow passenger aboard The Ark and The Dove, Thomas Greene, as his successor to the governorship.

Soon after his death in 1649, the Maryland Toleration Act, one of the first laws requiring religious tolerance, was written and enacted in the colony, further codifying its original proprietarial mandate of religious tolerance and re-establishing peace.

In 1890, the State of Maryland erected an obelisk monument to Calvert and his wife at Historic St. Mary's City which had a historical district created to commemorate the colonial origins of the colony. The obelisk is a cenotaph as the true location of his grave is unknown.

== See also ==
- List of colonial governors of Maryland

Political offices
Preceded by —	Provincial Governor of Maryland; 1634–1647	Succeeded by Thomas Greene
