= Maryland Dove =

Replica of the 17th-century vessel known for the founding of Maryland

Coordinates: 38°11′08″N 76°26′07″W

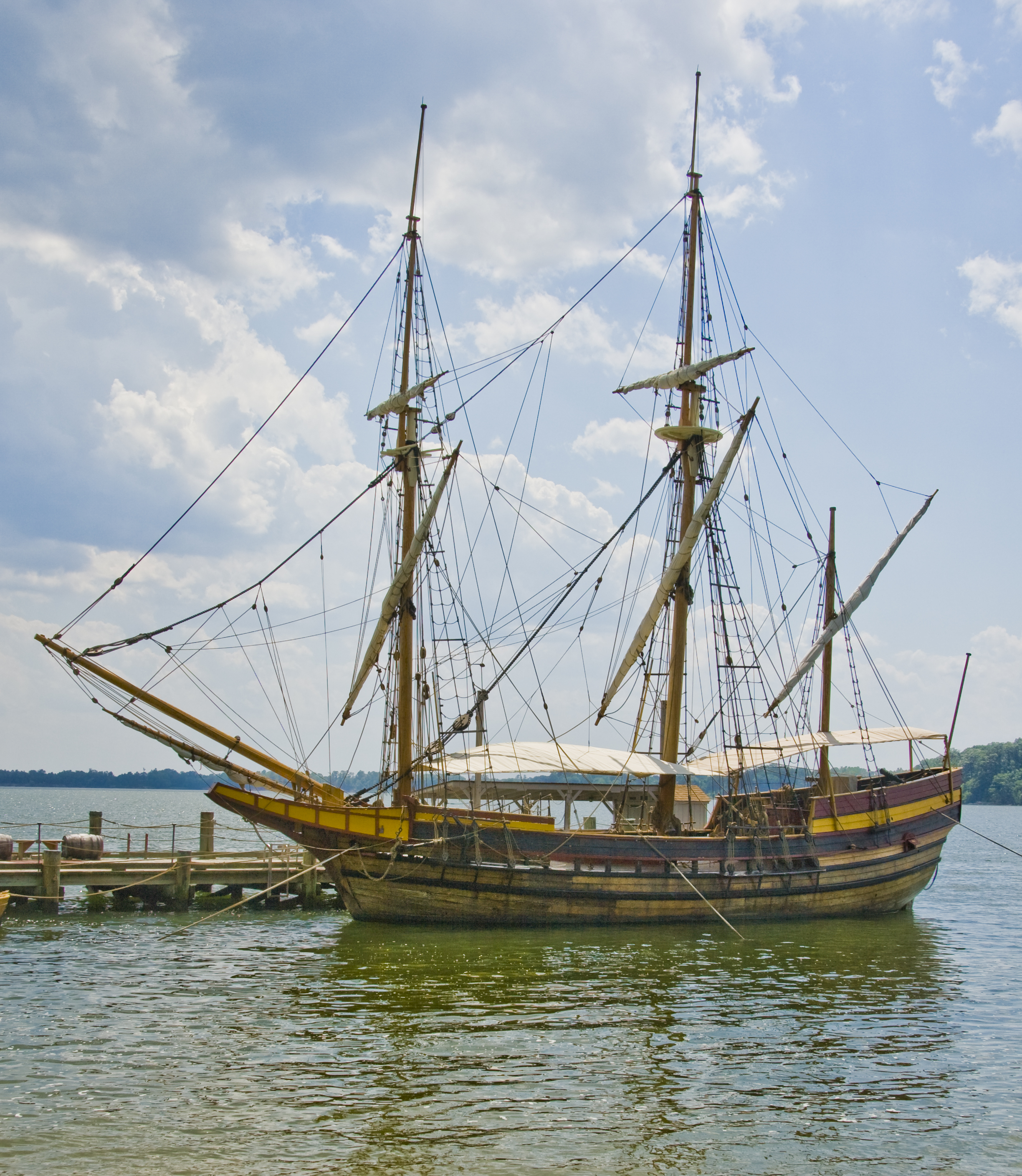
- The 17th Century English merchantmen pinnace Maryland Dove at St. Mary's City, Maryland, constructed for state 350th Anniversary, 1975-1978.

History

Maryland
- Name: Maryland Dove
- Owner: State of Maryland
- Operator: Historic St. Mary's City Commission
- Ordered: 1975
- Builder: James B. Richardson, shipyard, Cambridge, Dorchester County, Maryland
- Laid down: 1975
- Launched: August 14, 1978
- Commissioned: October 8, 1978
- Decommissioned: January 17, 2023

General characteristics
- Tons burthen: 40
- Length: 76 feet (23 meters) overall, and 56 ft (17 m) on deck.
- Beam: 17 ft (5.2 m)
- Draft: 7 ft (2.1 m)
- Propulsion: Sail (1,965 square feet (182.6 m^{2})); 2 × Lehman 4-cylinder, Super 90 diesel fuel Engines

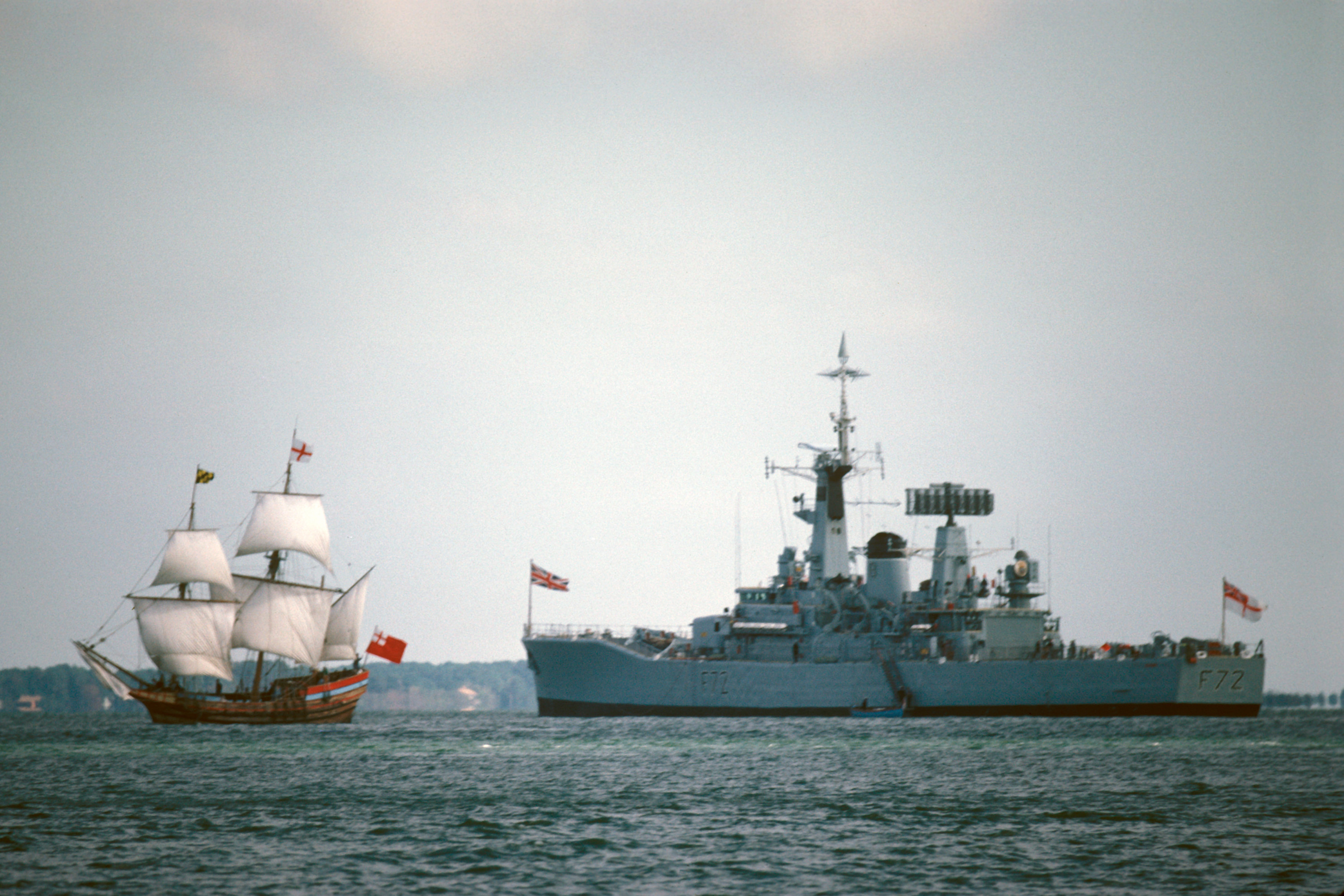
Maryland Dove and HMS Ariadne (F72) off Yorktown in October 1981 during the Siege of Yorktown bicentennial celebrations.

Maryland Dove is a re-creation of the Dove, an early 17th-century English trading ship, one of two ships (the other being The Ark) which made up the first expedition from the Kingdom of England to the Province of Maryland. The 1978 Dove was designed by the naval architect and naval historian William A. Baker. The namesake Dove was a trading vessel that could be sailed by a crew of seven. The much larger Ark, was a passenger ship, and was sailed by a crew of 40 or more. The Dove was left behind as a local trading vessel to facilitate commerce between Maryland and the other colonies.

== 1978 Dove ==
Launched in 1978, 1978 Dove was 56 feet in length on deck, and 76 feet overall with a displacement of 42 tons. She was built by James B. Richardson in a shipyard near Cambridge, Maryland in Dorchester County. Her home port is St. Mary's City, Maryland. The ship is owned by the State of Maryland and operated/maintained by the Historic St. Mary's City Commission. She was commissioned October 8, 1978 with Captain Thomas Doyle of Valley Lee, Maryland as her first licensed Master. Due to deteriorating condition of the Dove a replacement ship was laid down in 2019, launched in 2022 and assumed name Maryland Dove. The 1978 Dove was hauled out of the water for preservation in 2023, the decision on its fate has not been determined.

== New Maryland Dove ==
- Length Overall: 84 feet (26 m)
- Length on Deck: 57 feet
- Length at Waterline: 51 feet
- Beam: 17 feet
- Draft: 7 feet
- Height of Main Mast: 64 feet
- Sail Area: 2,019 square feet
- Power: 2 John Deere, 4-cylinder, PowerTech 4.5L engines

With the deteriorating condition of the 1978 Dove, construction began on June 1, 2019, on a new vessel. Designed by naval architect Iver Franzen, the ship was built at the Chesapeake Bay Maritime Museum shipyard in St. Michael's, Maryland. All work on the ship was done in full public view, allowing the public to experience every stage of the project. Documentation of the project can be found on www.MarylandDove.org The ship, Maryland Dove, was commissioned and delivered to Historic St. Mary's City on August 29, 2022.

== The original Dove ==
The first expedition from England to the planned colony of Maryland was undertaken by Cecilius Calvert, 2nd Baron Baltimore (1605–1675), and consisted of two ships that had formerly belonged to his father, George Calvert, 1st Baron Baltimore, (1579–1632): The Ark and Dove. The two ships departed Gravesend, in Kent off the English Channel, with 128 settlers on board and, after being chased down and brought back by the British Royal Navy so that the departing settlers could take an oath of allegiance to the King of England as required by law, sailed in October 1633 for the Isle of Wight (between England and France) to pick up more settlers.

At the Isle of Wight, Dove and her larger sister ship The Ark embarked again with two Jesuit (Society of Jesus) priests/chaplains and nearly two hundred more settlers before setting out across the Atlantic. Since he could not lead the expedition himself, Baltimore sent detailed instructions for the governance of the Colony (appointing his younger brother Leonard Calvert as the first colonial governor), including commands that his brothers seek any information about those who had earlier tried to thwart the granting of the colony and make contact with William Claiborne (previously settled from Province of Virginia on Kent Island in the middle of the Chesapeake Bay) to determine his intentions for the trading station on Kent Island. The instructions also emphasized the importance of religious toleration among the colonists, who were nearly equal parts Catholic and Protestant. With these last instructions, the expedition sailed for the Americas.

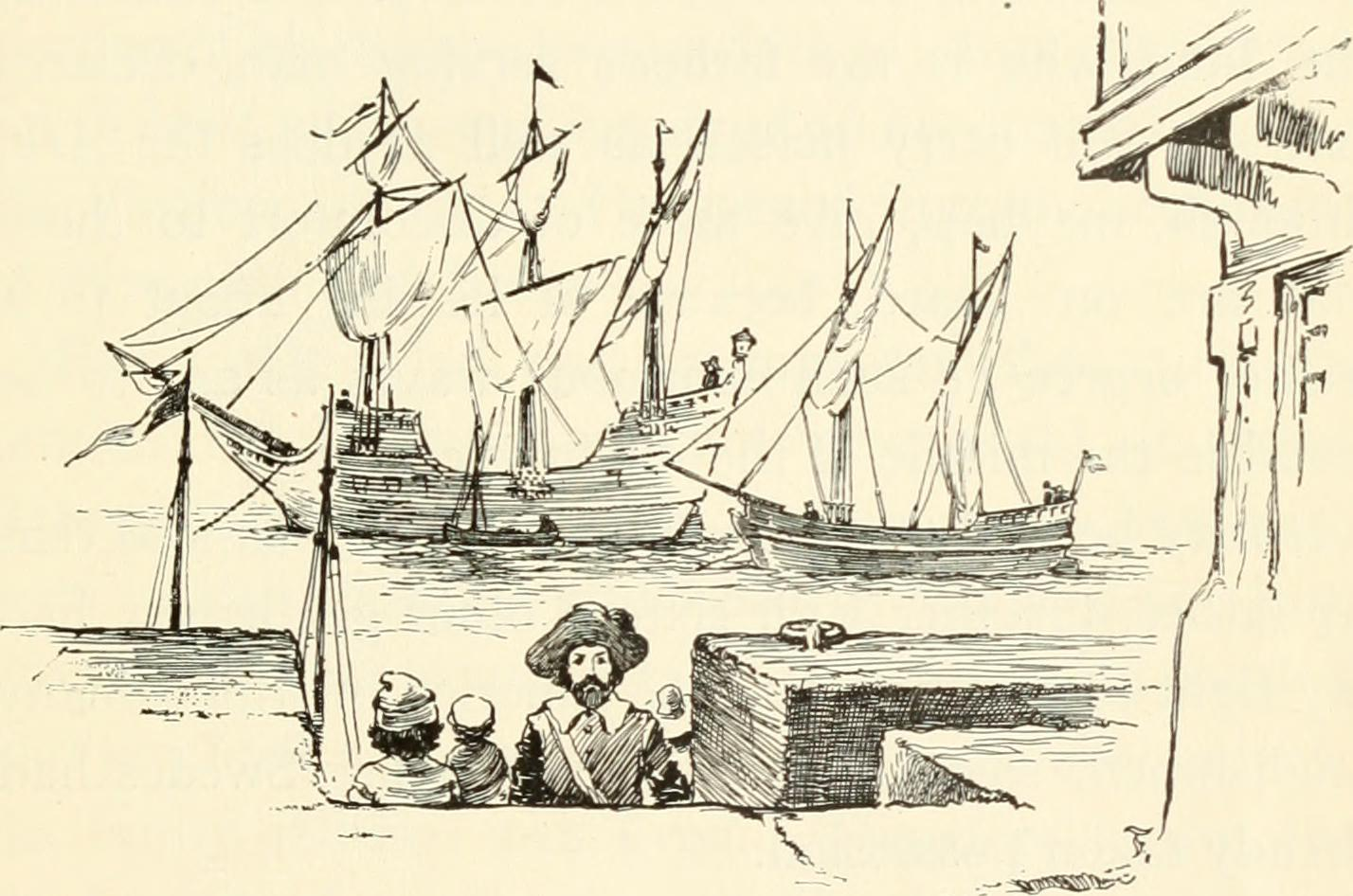
Illustration of the Ark (left) and the Dove (right)

The two ships arrived at Point Comfort at the mouths of the James, Nansemond, and Elizabeth Rivers, in Virginia, February 24, 1634. On March 25, they landed at what is now St. Mary's, then the site of a Native American village, and they began the work of establishing a settlement there. The settlement of St. Mary's was built on land purchased from the native Yaocomico.

Back in England, Baltimore could do little to help the young colony through its tribulations, which included an ongoing feud with Claiborne that led to a series of naval skirmishes. Lord Baltimore continued as Maryland's first Proprietor (1632–1675), and attempted to maintain an active involvement in the governance of the colony, though he never visited it. During this long tenure, he governed through deputies, the last being his only son Charles.

== In popular culture ==
1978 Dove was used extensively to represent the Mayflower in the 1979 made-for-TV film 'Mayflower: The Pilgrims Adventure' starring Anthony Hopkins as Captain Jones as well as Richard Crenna and Jenny Aguttar.

== See also ==
- Province of Maryland
