= The Ark (ship) =

17th century English merchant ship

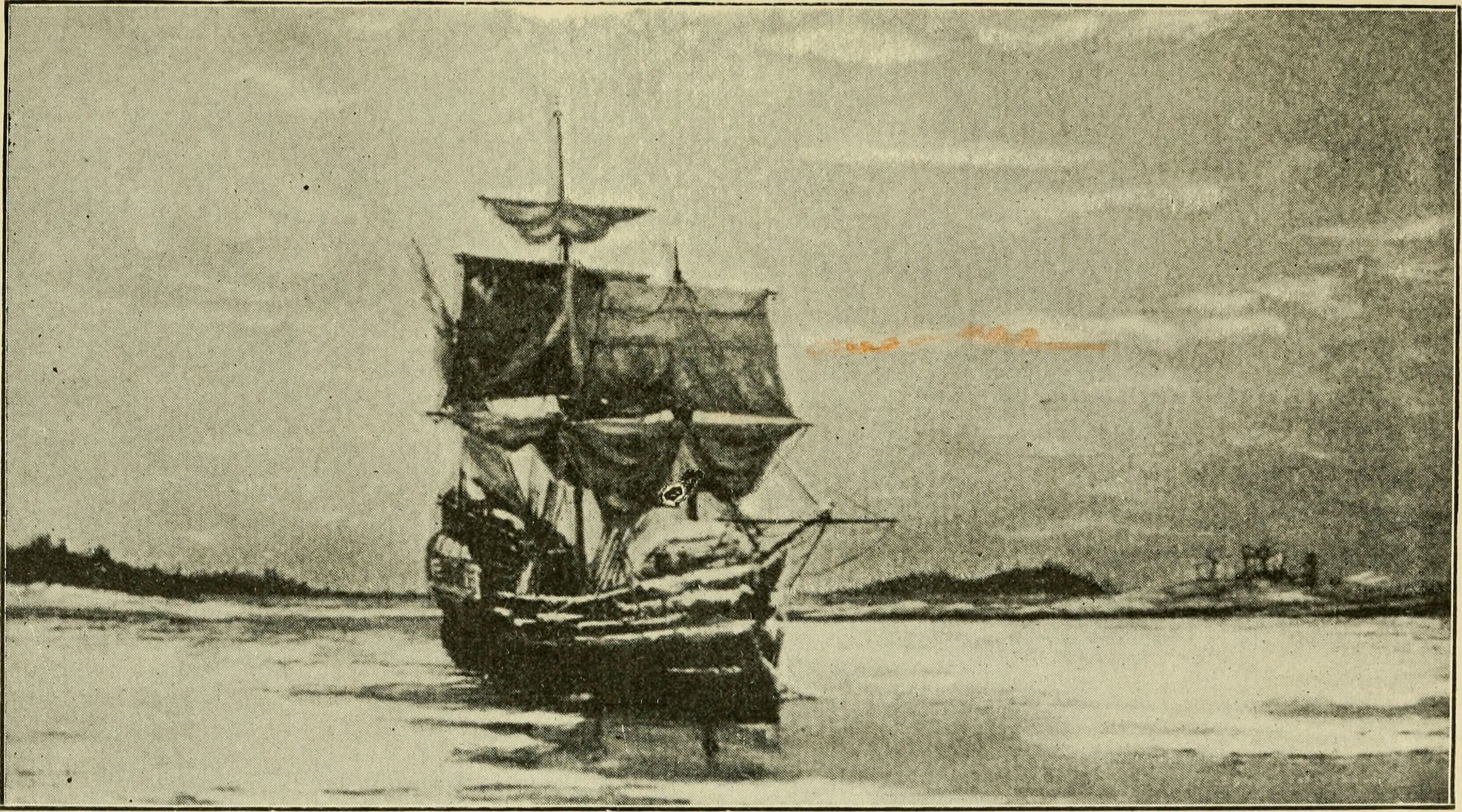
- The Ark, from a print in the possession of the Maryland Historical Society

History

Kingdom of England
- Name: The Ark
- Owner: Hired by Cecilius Calvert, second Baron or Lord Baltimore, (1605–1675)
- Launched: c. 1630
- Fate: Lost 1635

General characteristics
- Tons burthen: 400
- Length: Approximately 132 feet (40 m) on deck
- Beam: 32 feet (9.8 m)
- Draft: 14–15 feet (4.3–4.6 m)
- Depth of hold: 14 feet (4.3 m)
- Propulsion: Sail
- Sail plan: Three masted, Spritsail& spritsail topsail, fore course, fore topsail & fore topgallant, main course, main topsail and main topgallant, Lateen mizzen with square topsail.
- Complement: Approximately 40 seamen
- Armament: Unknown, but probably capable of mounting 20-25 cannon.

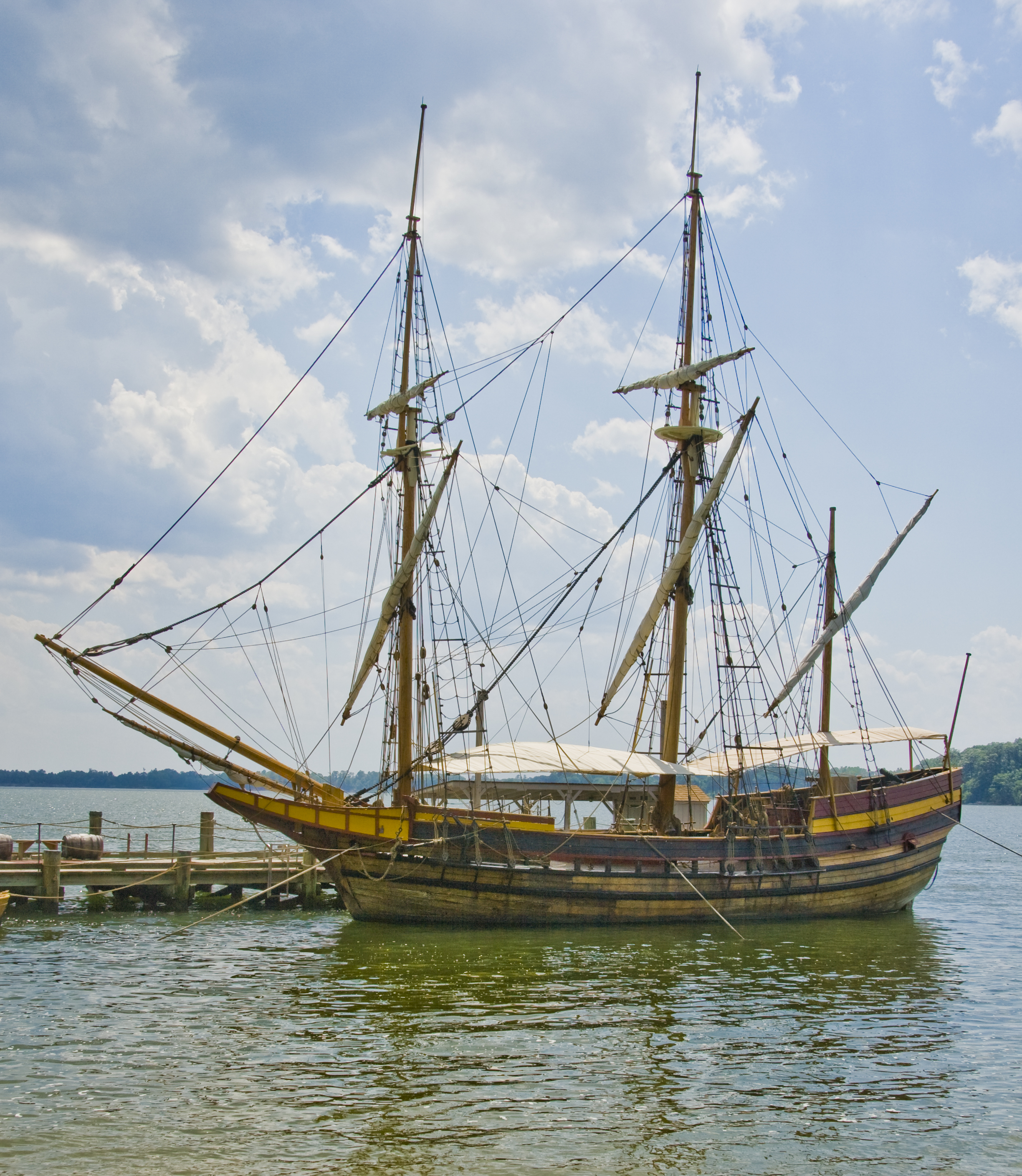
A modern reconstruction and replica of a small 17th Century English trading ship, the Maryland Dove at St. Mary's City, Maryland, is approximately the same size as her namesake, the c. 1630 Dove which accompanied The Ark on the historic trans-oceanic voyage in late 1633 and early 1634.

The Ark was a 400-ton English merchant ship hired in 1633 by Cecil Calvert, 2nd Baron Baltimore to bring roughly 140 English colonists and their equipment and supplies to the new colony and Province of Maryland, one of the original Thirteen Colonies of British North America on the Atlantic Ocean eastern seaboard. On the historic trans-oceanic voyage from England in late 1633 and early 1634, The Ark was accompanied by the smaller 40-ton pinnace Dove.

== Maryland expedition ==
On 22 November 1633 (392 years ago), after several delays, two ships, the Ark and Dove, sailed from the Isle of Wight off the south coast of England. Three days later a storm in the English Channel separated the Ark from Dove. When Dove disappeared from view, she was flying distress lanterns, and those aboard the Ark assumed she had sunk in the storm. A second more violent storm hit the Ark on 29 November 1633 and lasted three days, finally subsiding on 1 December. In the midst of the storm, the mainsail was split in half and the crew was forced to tie down the tiller and whipstaff so the ship lay ahull, keeping her bow to the wind and waves as she drifted. This was the last bad weather the Ark encountered on the trans-Atlantic voyage.

On 25 December 1633, wine was passed out to celebrate Christmas. The following day, 30 colonists fell ill with a fever brought on by excessive drinking and 12 died, including two of the Roman Catholic colonists. These were the only losses suffered on the voyage. On 3 January 1633/34 (see below on the start of the new year), the Ark arrived at the island of Barbados in the West Indies after a voyage of 42 days from England. About two weeks later, Dove arrived. As it later developed, Dove had been able to reach the shelter of Plymouth harbor where she rode out the storm.

On 24 January 1633/34, the ships departed Barbados. An earlier departure was intended but was delayed because Richard Orchard, master (captain) of the Dove had departed inland to collect some debts and could not be found on the intended sailing date. After making a few other stops in the Caribbean Sea, on 24 February 1633/34 the ships arrived at Point Comfort (now called Old Point Comfort) at the mouths of the James, Nansemond, and Elizabeth rivers, which formed the great harbor of Hampton Roads in Virginia. This ended their ocean voyage which had lasted slightly over three months, of which 66 days were actually spent at sea. The two ships briefly stopped in Jamestown, Virginia, up the James River.

After a week's stay, the Calvert colonists then sailed northward up the large expanse of the Bay, landing on St. Clement's Island, also known as Blakistone Island, on the north shore of the Potomac River, across from Virginia's northern border, on 25 March 1634. This day was thereafter celebrated annually in the colony and free State as Maryland Day. The colonists planted a large cross, claiming the land in the name of Charles I, King of England, and holding their first communal Mass led by the accompanying Jesuit chaplain, Father Andrew White. The date 25 March has been traditionally taken to mark the end of the voyage, although, in fact, the voyage had actually ended earlier on 24 February, when the Ark and the Dove arrived at Point Comfort entering the North American continental waters. 25 March is the Feast of the Annunciation of the Blessed Virgin Mary, a major festival day in the liturgical calendar. Until 1752, when England finally adopted the Gregorian Calendar, superseding the older and inaccurate Julian Calendar, 25 March was the start of the civil new year,

Although too small for the intended settlement, St. Clement's provided a relatively secure base from which Leonard Calvert, the first Governor of Maryland and younger brother of Cecilius, could explore the area and negotiate the purchase of land for the new colony. After a brief three-week stay on the island, the new Marylanders occupied a nearby Piscataway Indian village they had purchased on the St. George's (later the St. Mary's) River, several miles (kilometers) southeast from St. Clement's and about 12 miles (19 km) northwest from Point Lookout, where the Potomac River enters the Chesapeake Bay. The new English settlement was named St. Mary's City in honor of The Virgin, and later became the provincial capital, and then the county seat/courthouse in the first county to be "erected" (established), St. Mary's County.

In the early summer of 1634, the Ark returned to England. The Dove, which had been also purchased by Calvert and the gentry investors in the new colony, remained for the settlers' use in and around the Bay and coasts of Maryland.

In August 1635, the Dove sailed for England carrying timber and beaver pelts, but she never arrived home and was presumed lost in a storm. Maryland Dove is a modern replica of the vessel.

== See also ==
- Province of Maryland

== Bibliography ==
- Browne, William Hand (1890). George Calvert and Cecilius Calvert: Barons Baltimore of Baltimore. New York: Dodd, Mead, and Company.
- Chapelle, Suzanne Ellery Greene, Maryland: A History of Its People Retrieved 6 August 2010
- Russell, Donna Valley and George Ely, The Ark and the Dove Adventurers Retrieved 6 August 2010
