= Yaocomico =

Group of indigenous people native to North America

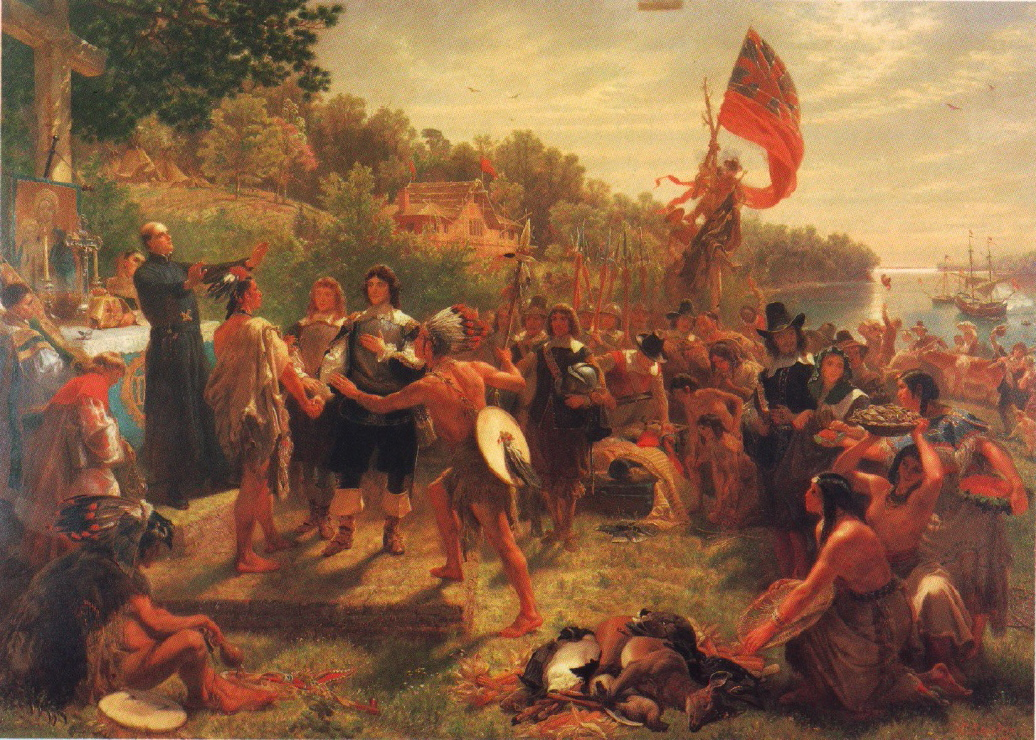
- The Founding of Maryland (1634) depicts colonists meeting the people of the Yaocomico branch of the Piscataway in St. Mary's City, Maryland, the site of Maryland's first colonial settlement.

Total population
- Extinct as a tribe

Regions with significant populations
- Maryland, north of Potomac River

Languages
- Eastern Algonquian, historical

Religion
- Native

Related ethnic groups
- Piscataway

The Yaocomico /jaʊˈkɒməkoʊ/, also spelled Yaocomaco, were an Algonquian-speaking Native American group who lived along the north bank of the Potomac River near its confluence with the Chesapeake Bay in the 17th century. They were related to the Piscataway, the dominant nation north of the Potomac.

The settlers who arrived to found the English colony of Maryland purchased land for their first settlement from the Yaocomico. By the late 17th century, the tribe had disappeared from the historical record. Historians believe this was mostly due to epidemics of newly introduced infectious disease and to pressure from European settlers and other Native groups.

== Description and history ==
The Yaocomaco were one of the Algonquian-speaking groups, who lived mostly in the coastal tidewater areas of present-day Maryland. The Piscataway were dominant to the north of the Potomac River, but there were many smaller tribes such as the Yaocomaco. Maryland also had Iroquoian-speaking tribes, particularly the Susquehannock along the Susquehanna River, who had been raiding into Algonquian territory. To the west and southwest lived the Saponi, Tutelo, Occaneechi and Manahoac, who spoke Siouan languages.

According to historical tradition, the first settlers of the Maryland colony purchased the land for their settlement at St. Mary's City from the Yaocomico, who had a settlement in the area. In 1634, Leonard Calvert, the first governor of the Maryland colony, met the Yaocomico along the Potomac below the island the Europeans had named St. Clement's Island. Yaocomico is referred to in different sources as either the name of the natives living in the area or as the name of the leader of the village. It was a tribe. The colonists had previously encountered and traded with Natives further upriver and so had some experience with them. As a result of the meeting, the Yaocomico traded approximately 30 acres (12 ha) of land for a variety of European-made metal tools and cloth. Apparently the Yaocomico were willing to relocate from this village, and it was an ideal place for European settlement, as it had already been cleared.

Father Andrew White, a Jesuit missionary priest and early Maryland settler, described the Yaocomico in detail. They dressed in deerskin decorated with natural objects such as shells, animal teeth, and feathers. Their bodies were painted in different colors. They drew red and blue lines on their faces. The women wore tattoos on various parts of the body, and used manmade beads to adorn their bodies and clothing. White claimed the Yaocomico were such skilled archers that they could throw a stick in the air and hit it with an arrow before it hit the ground. The Yaocomico had a loose structure of government and generally peaceful relations with other Algonquin groups.

They cultivated the staple crops of the woodland natives, varieties of corn, beans, and squash. In addition, they gathered foods, fished and hunted in the rich coastal environment. The first European settlers described a number of Native celebrations throughout the year, often involving feasting and music. Their instruments were made from readily available materials and included rattles, drums, and flutes.

European accounts claimed the Yaocomico were ready to sell the land to the Maryland colonists because they were being threatened by Iroquoian-speaking tribes from the north, specifically the Susquehannock and Seneca, the latter part of the Iroquois Confederacy. Despite relations with the Piscataway and the larger Powhatan Confederacy to the south, the Yaocomico had apparently decided to abandon the area before the arrival of Europeans. Both the Yaocomico and their neighbors had been raided repeatedly by groups of Susquehannock warriors based further up the Chesapeake, along what the settlers named the Susquehanna River. Such raids had pushed most Algonquian Natives out of the lands along the upper Chesapeake Bay, concentrating them in the south, where they encountered English settlers. The Yaocomico sought to use the new settlers as buffers against the Susquehannock.

About half the Yaocomico left the site of St. Mary's City immediately. The other half left after a year, to allow them to maintain and harvest their crops. In the interim, the Yaocomico proved an invaluable resource to the settlers, teaching them how to survive in the new world. The Europeans, in return, wrote favorably of the Yaocomico. Jesuit priests arriving with the first colonists attempted to convert the Natives to Catholicism. They also continued to trade or share some European goods with the natives.

The Maryland settlers continued to maintain good relations with the Yaocomico through the next few decades. They included provisions to protect them in treaties with neighboring tribes. But, the Yaocomico disappeared by the 1670s or 1680s. Historians now believe that Eurasian infectious diseases carried by the English were the most likely cause. The Natives had no immunity to such diseases, by then endemic among European populations. There was also continuing encroachment and competition by settlers or other native groups.

Modern St. Mary's City includes a mock-up of the original Yaocomico village. The village shows Algonquian-style longhouses as they would have appeared to the first European settlers.
