= St. Clement's Island State Park =

State park in St. Mary's County, Maryland

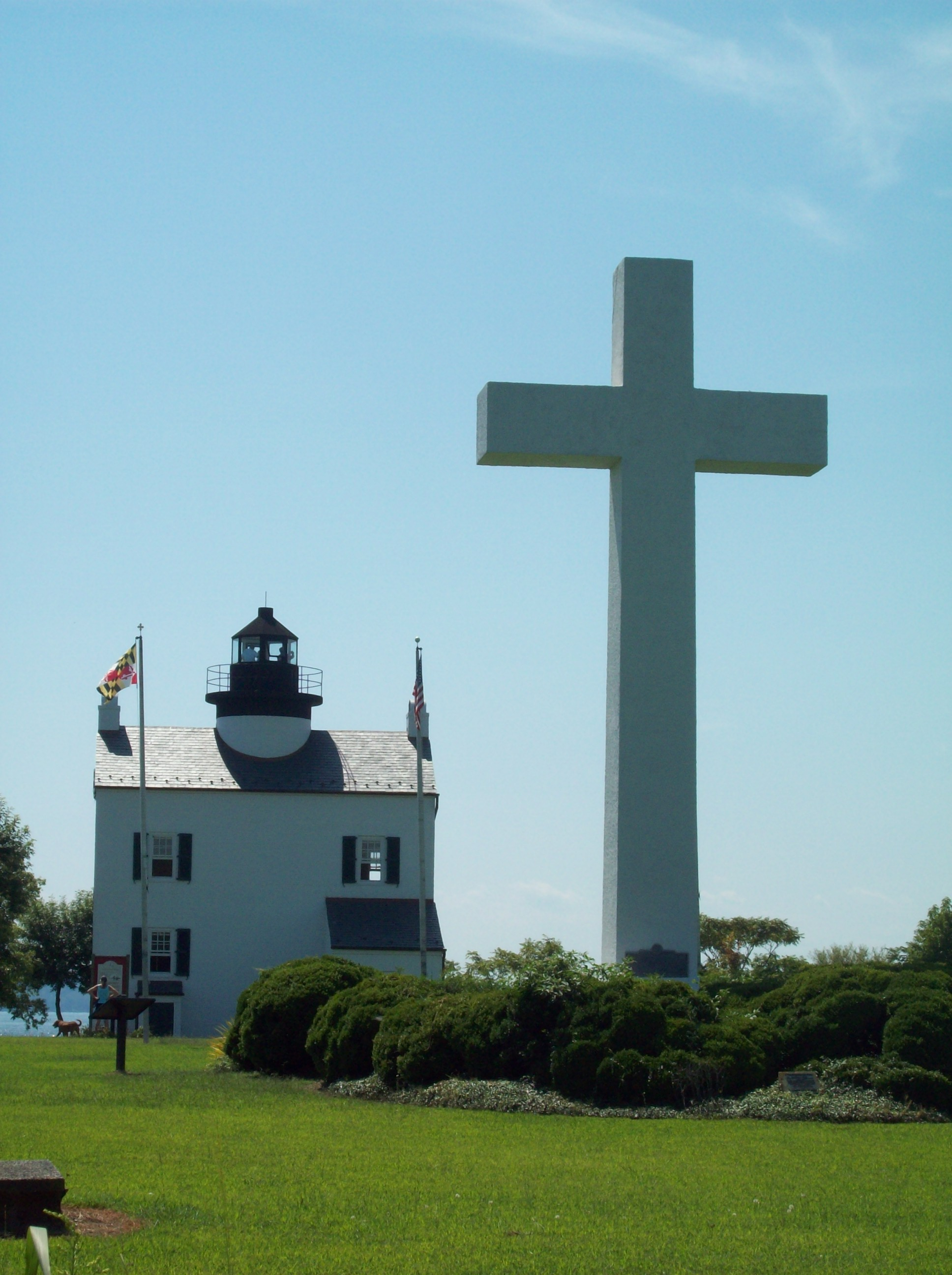
- Commemorative cross and rebuilt Blackistone Lighthouse

- Location within Maryland
- Location: Saint Mary's County, Maryland, United States
- Coordinates: 38°12′40″N 76°44′44″W
- Area: 62 acres (25 ha)
- Elevation: 10 ft (3.0 m)
- Established: 1962
- Administrator: Maryland Department of Natural Resources
- Designation: Maryland state park
- Website: Official website
- St. Clement's Island Historic District
- U.S. National Register of Historic Places
- U.S. Historic district
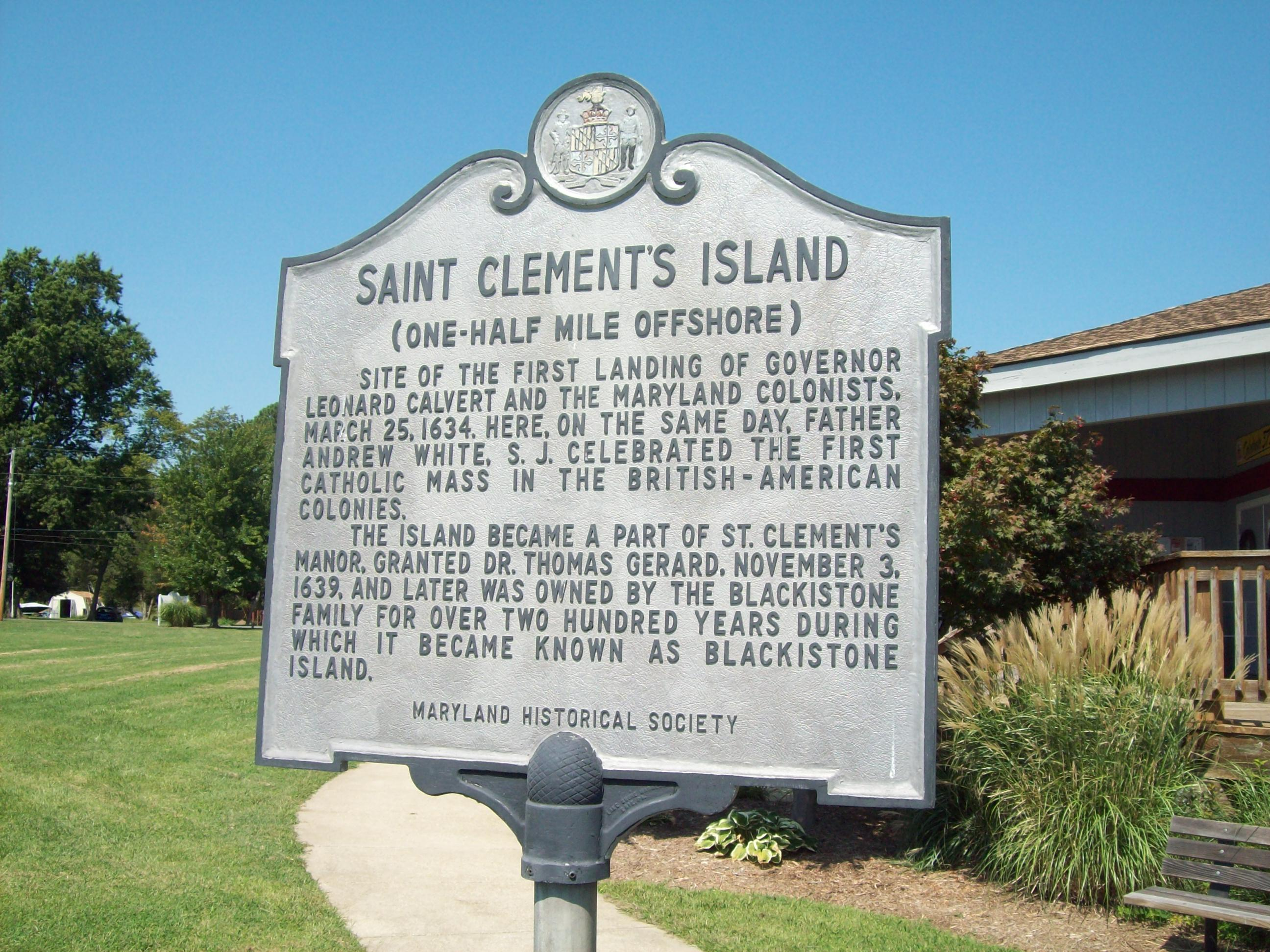
- Nearest city: Leonardtown, Maryland
- Area: 1,499 acres (607 ha)
- NRHP reference No.: 72001484
- Added to NRHP: April 10, 1972

St. Clement's Island State Park is a Maryland state park on St. Clement's Island, an uninhabited Potomac River island lying one-half mile southeast of Colton's Point, St. Mary's County, Maryland. The park features a 40-foot stone cross dedicated to the beginnings of freedom of religion in the United States as well as a reconstruction of the historic Blakistone Island Light. It is the central feature of the St. Clement's Island Historic District that was listed on the National Register of Historic Places in 1972.

== History ==
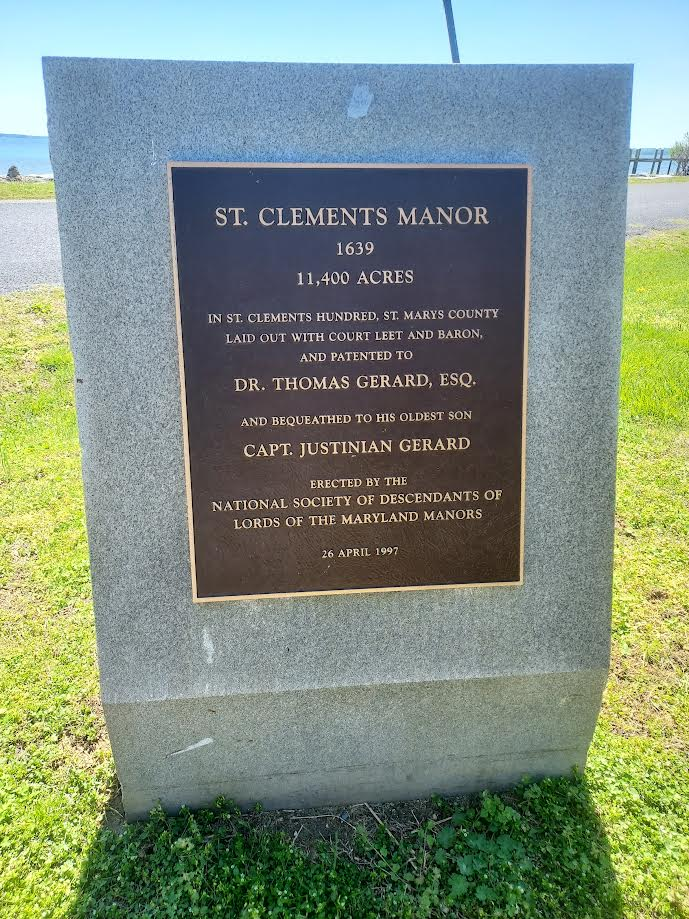
St Clement's Manor plaque at St Clement's Island State Park

The park preserves the site of the March 23, 1634, landing of Maryland's first colonists, who had sailed from Cowes on the Isle of Wight in England four months earlier. On March 25, the colonists celebrated a mass of thanksgiving for their safe arrival and this date is commemorated annually as Maryland Day. The island was a convenient, temporary base of operations for the 150 settlers as they negotiated with the Yaocomico Native Americans for land for a permanent settlement. They named the island in honor of Pope Clement I, patron saint of mariners. It was the site of the first Roman Catholic Mass celebrated in the British-American colonies, said by Jesuit Father Andrew White.

The island measured "not above 400 acres" at the time of the settlers' landing, according to White's account of the journey. Five years later, in 1639, the Surveyor General measured the island and found that it was about 80 acres. It formed part of St. Clement's Manor, which was granted by the Second Lord Baltimore to Thomas Gerard in 1639. Gerard subsequently became a major landholder and political figure in Maryland and Virginia. After the island became the property of Gerard's daughter Elizabeth, the wife of Nehemiah Blackistone, it became known as Blackistone Island.

After the Blackistone family took ownership in 1669, the island remained in the family for 162 years. It was taken over by the US Navy in 1919, at which time a landing strip and piers were built and the island's buildings and trees were removed. In 1962, the property was designated as a state park when it was leased from the Federal government and its name reverted to St. Clement's Island. The name change was made official by the Board of Geographic Names in 1965.

== Features ==
The island's 40-foot stone cross was erected in 1934 in celebration of Maryland's 300th anniversary, recognizing the location as one of the foundation sites of religious toleration in the United States.

A replica of the Blakistone Island Light was completed in 2008 through the efforts of the St. Clement's Hundred community organization. The original lighthouse occupied the island from 1851 until 1956 when it was destroyed by fire.

== Activities and amenities ==
The island is only accessible by private boat or via a water taxi that operates seasonally from the St. Clement's Island Museum in Colton's Point. Activities on the island include hiking, picnicking, fishing, and hunting.
