= Thomas Claiborne =

Thomas Claiborne may refer to:

- Thomas Claiborne (Virginia politician), Democrat; member of Virginia state legislature; U.S. representative from Virginia
- Thomas A. Claiborne (1770s–1818), physician and Tennessee state legislator
- Thomas Claiborne (politician, born 1780), Democrat; lawyer; member of Tennessee state house of representatives; U.S. representative from Tennessee
- Thomas Claiborne (soldier), 19th-century Tennessee lawyer
