= Thomas Claiborne (soldier) =

Confederate army officer (1823–1911)

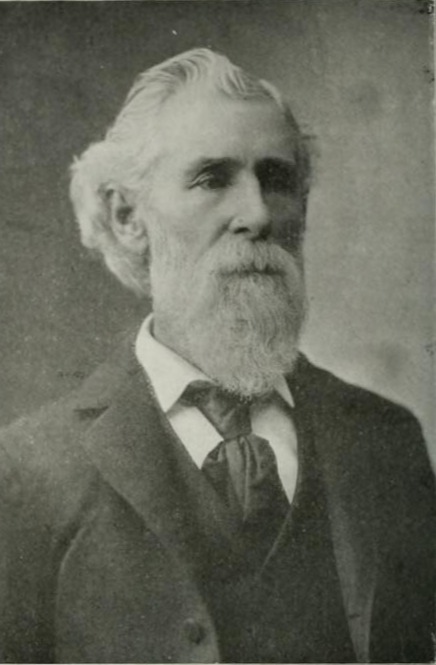
- Claiborne c.1893

Clerk of the United States Department of the Treasury
- In office 1845–1846

Personal details
- Born: June 20, 1823 Davidson County, Tennessee
- Died: June 2, 1911 (aged 87) Nashville, Tennessee
- Resting place: Mount Olivet Cemetery; Nashville, Tennessee
- Relations: Thomas Claiborne (father); Thomas Claiborne (grandfather); William Claiborne (paternal ancestor)

Military service
- Allegiance: United States of America; Confederate States
- Branch/service: United States Army; Confederate Army
- Years of service: 1853–1856 (USA); 1861–1863 (CSA)
- Rank: Captain (USA); Colonel (CSA)
- Unit: Regiment of Mounted Riflemen
- Commands: 1st Kentucky Infantry Regiment
- Battles/wars: Mexican-American War: Siege of Veracruz; Battle of Cerro Gordo; Battle of Huamantla; American Indian Wars; American Civil War: First Battle of Bull Run; Confederate Heartland Offensive; Battle of Perryville; Stones River Campaign; Battle of Stones River; Chickamauga-Chattanooga Campaign; Battle of Chickamauga

Thomas Claiborne (June 20, 1823 – June 2, 1911) was a Tennessee lawyer, treasurer, farmer, and military officer who fought in the Mexican–American War, the American Indian Wars, and the American Civil War. Claiborne is part of the larger Claiborne-Dallas-Boggs family, an American political family.

== Early life ==
Thomas Claiborne was born on June 20, 1823 in Davidson County, Tennessee. Claiborne was the son of Thomas Claiborne (1780–1856) and Sarah Martin Lewis. Claiborne's father was a state representative and politician originally from Virginia, he served in Creek War under Andrew Jackson and was a Democratic-Republican during the 15th United States Congress. Claiborne was also the grandson of Thomas Claiborne (1749–1812), Claiborne was also a direct descendant of William Claiborne, the Secretary of the Colony of Virginia.

In 1843 Claiborne was admitted to the Tennessee bar exam to practice law. In 1851 Claiborne married Annie Armstrong Maxwell. Claiborne later moved to Trenton, Tennessee where he was the editor of the local newspaper, the True American. Shortly before his military service Claiborne was appointed as a clerk for the United States Department of the Treasury from 1845-1846.

== Military career ==
=== Mexican-American War ===
At the outbreak of the Mexican–American War Claiborne was appointed by President of the United States James K. Polk on May 27, 1846 and served as a Second Lieutenant in Company B of the Regiment of Mounted Riflemen under Colonel Persifor Frazer Smith. During the war Claiborne participated in the Siege of Veracruz, the Battle of Cerro Gordo, and the Battle of Huamantla among others. Albert Gallatin Brackett describes Claiborne in the book General Lane's Brigade in Central Mexico as being "among the foremost in hot pursuit and ever ready to assault the foe".

By the close of the war Claiborne attained the rank of Brevet Captain of Company C. According to the book Mexican War Veterans: A Complete Roster of the Regular and Volunteers Troops in the War Between the United States and Mexico, from 1846 to 1848, Claiborne was awarded his brevet rank following the Battle of Huamantla for meritorious service during the battle.

=== 1849 Oregon Trail Expedition ===
From May to October 1849 Claiborne took part in a military expedition with the Regiment of Mounted Rifles along the Oregon Trail from Fort Leavenworth to Fort Vancouver under the command of Philip Kearny.

=== Indian Wars ===
From 1856-1861 Claiborne served at a variety of posts during the American Indian Wars, primarily in New Mexico Territory and Oregon Territory still with his old unit, the Regiment of Mounted Riflemen. During this time Claiborne was stationed at Fort Stanton and Fort Union.

=== American Civil War ===
At the outbreak of the American Civil War Claiborne resigned his commission as Captain on April 14, 1861 just one day after the Battle of Fort Sumter. Claiborne subsequently joined the Confederate States Army and was assigned a staff officer under Joseph E. Johnston and later commanded a battalion of the 1st Kentucky Infantry Regiment before serving as the Assistant Inspector General of the Army of Northern Virginia before being reassigned to fight in the Trans-Mississippi theater of the American Civil War and the Western theater of the American Civil War. Claiborne took part in the Battle of Lockridge Mill alongside William Hicks Jackson and successfully captured several officers and enlisted men of the 5th Iowa Cavalry Regiment. During the latter course of the American Civil War, Claiborne was primarily a staff officer and served on the staffs of Albert Sidney Johnston, P. G. T. Beauregard, Simon Bolivar Buckner, William J. Hardee, and Edmund Kirby Smith.

== Later life ==
In the postwar era Claiborne was involved in farming near Nashville and was a member of the United Confederate Veterans of Tennessee. Claiborne is mentioned heavily in the June 1913 volume of the Confederate Veteran. Claiborne died on June 2, 1911 at the age of 87, he is buried in Mount Olivet Cemetery in Nashville, Tennessee.
