= Senator Claiborne (disambiguation) =

William C. C. Claiborne (died 1817) was a U.S. Senator from Louisiana from 1817 to 1817. Senator Claiborne may also refer to:

- Nathaniel Claiborne (1777–1859), Virginia State Senate
- Thomas Claiborne (Virginia politician), Virginia State Senate
