= Nathaniel C. Claiborne =

American lawyer and politician

Member of the Virginia House of Delegates for Franklin County, Virginia
- In office December 4, 1848 – April 26, 1852 Serving with William H. Edwards
- Preceded by: Richard M. Taliaferro
- Succeeded by: William Champe

Member of the Missouri House of Representatives from Jackson County
- In office 1860–1861

Member of the Missouri House of Representatives from St. Louis County
- In office 1868–1871

Personal details
- Born: February 15, 1822 Claybrook plantation, Franklin County, Virginia
- Died: February 1, 1889 (aged 66) Webster Groves, St. Louis County Missouri, U.S.
- Spouse: Mildred
- Children: 3
- Parent(s): Nathaniel H. Claiborne, Elizabeth Archer Binford
- Relatives: William C.C. Claiborne
- Education: Washington College
- Occupation: Lawyer, hotelier

Nathaniel Charles Claiborne (February 15, 1822 – February 1, 1889) was an American lawyer, politician and businessman who held legislative offices in Virginia and later in Missouri. Although he generally aligned with the Democratic Party and attended several national conventions of that party, he also once unsuccessfully ran for a seat in the U.S. House of Representatives as a member of the Know Nothing party.

== Early life ==
Claiborne was born in 1822 on his father's plantation in Franklin County, Virginia into what would later be called the First Families of Virginia. His mother was Elizabeth Archer Binford and through his father, Nathaniel H. Claiborne, he could trace his ancestry to William Claiborne who had emigrated from England to the Virginia Colony early in the 17th century, and whose exploits also affected the Maryland and Pennsylvania colonies. His name reflected his father's, as well as that of his uncle William Charles Cole Claiborne, a Tennessee congressman who would become a territorial and state governor of Louisiana, as well as a U.S. senator from that state. He had an elder brother, Ferdinand Leigh Claiborne, as well as younger brothers and several sisters. His attorney father, who owned slaves, had already begun a career which would include terms in both houses of the Virginia General Assembly as well as a dozen years in the U.S. House of Representatives. Claiborne received a private education suitable to his class and graduated from Washington College in 1837–1838.

== Career ==
The Virginia Capitol at Richmond VA where 19th century Conventions met

Following graduation, Claiborne traveled in the western United States and worked on steamboats to support himself. However, by 1846 he returned Franklin County, was admitted to the bar, and began a legal career. A successful criminal attorney in Virginia and later in Missouri, Claiborne reportedly never lost a jury trial.

Franklin County voters elected Claiborne as one of their representatives to the Virginia House of Delegates in 1848 and re-elected him once. Earlier that year, he attended the Democratic National Convention. Claiborne served on the Committee for Courts of Justice in both terms. In his second term Claiborne also served on a special committee that formulated the state's response to the Wilmot Proviso (which would have restricted slavery in new territories) as well as presented swords or medals to Virginians who fought in the Mexican–American War. Claiborne also successfully advocated for an equestrian statue of George Washington to be erected on Capitol Square in Richmond. During the 1849–1850 session, although that committee generally opposed funding internal improvements, Claiborne occasionally supported them, and also considered Richmond citizens' desire to elect their city officers.

In 1850, Claiborne polled the second highest among ten candidates seeking to represent the Southside delegate district made up of his home Franklin County, as well as nearby Patrick and Henry Counties in the Virginia Constitutional Convention of 1850. He served alongside William Martin and Archibald Stuart. During the convention, Claiborne supported internal improvements and declared that as long as the delegates brought a railroad line to Franklin County he would vote for almost any guarantee for basing representation on a mixed basis of property holding and population. Thus, near the convention's end he voted for the final compromise that gave western Virginians a majority in the House of Delegates but allowed eastern slaveholding interests to retain a majority in the Virginia Senate. However he left the convention on July 30, 1851 and so did not vote on the constitution's final approval.

In 1852, Claiborne won election to become Franklin County's commonwealth Attorney (prosecutor), normally a four-year tern. However, after attending the 1852 Democratic National Convention as well as the state Democratic convention (during which he promised to support the Democratic candidate for governor), Claiborne agreed to run for Congress in 1855 as a member of the Know-Nothing Party against Thomas S. Bocock (who had held the seat since 1847). However, Bocock won by more than 1,700 votes of more than 10,000 cast. Bocock savaged Claiborne in debates and the Lynchburg Republican and other papers decried Claiborne as lacking political principles or as a traitor to the Democratic party.

In early 1857, Claiborne relocated with his family to Kansas City, Missouri, where he again practiced law as well as opened a hotel. He won election to the Missouri House of Representatives from Jackson County, Missouri in 1860, and later in 1868 and 1871. In 1860, Claiborne was part of the Missouri delegation at both sessions of the Democratic National Convention, and also attended the 1864 Democratic National Convention in Chicago as an alternate. Of court the Democratic candidates nominated at both those conventions lost the contest for the presidency to Abraham Lincoln. At the onset of the American Civil War, in 1861 Claiborne moved to St. Louis and became Secretary of the Missouri State Senate.

During his career in Missouri, Claiborne was known as the "silver-tongued orator of the west", in great demand during Presidential campaigns although he reportedly declined several requests to run for that state's governor.

== Personal life ==
On June 13, 1849, Claiborne married Mildred Kyle Morris (1829–1908) of Buckingham County. She survived him, as did their two daughters who reached adulthood: Virginia Claiborne Adams (1853–1920) and Nathalie Claiborne Green Buchanan (1858–1931). However, their son John Herbert Latrobe Claiborne (1850–1882), who attended the Virginia Military Institute and later joined his father's law practice, was killed by a train during his parents' lifetimes.

== Death ==
Nathaniel C. Claiborne died of uremia and acute bronchitis at his home in St. Louis County, Missouri in 1889, and was buried at Oak Hill cemetery in Kirkwood, Missouri.

== Bibliography ==
- "Officers of the Missouri Senate and House, 1820-2011". Records and Archives: Missouri History. Missouri Secretary of State. 2011.
- Napton, William Barclay (2005). The Union on Trial: the political journals of Judge William Barclay Napton. University of Missouri Press. ISBN 978-0-8262-6461-9. "Nathaniel C. Claiborne of Missouri."
- Pulliam, David Loyd (1901). The Constitutional Conventions of Virginia from the foundation of the Commonwealth to the present time. John T. West, Richmond. ISBN 978-1-2879-2059-5.
