= Airdrie =

Airdrie may refer to:

- Airdrie, North Lanarkshire, a town in Scotland
  - Airdrieonians F.C., an association football club based in Airdrie, North Lanarkshire
  - Airdrieonians F.C. (1878), a former association football club based in Airdrie, North Lanarkshire
- Airdrie (Scottish Parliament constituency)
- Airdrie, Alberta, a city in Canada
  - Airdrie (electoral district), a provincial political division representing the Alberta city
- Airdrie (Nashville, Tennessee), a historic house in Nashville, Tennessee, United States
- Airdrie, Kentucky, a former community in Muhlenberg County, Kentucky
