= Airdrie (Nashville, Tennessee) =

Historic house in Tennessee, United States

- U.S. National Register of Historic Places
- Location within Tennessee Location within the United States
- Location: 3210 Avenal Avenue, Nashville, Tennessee, U.S.
- Coordinates: 36.1031°N 86.7318°W
- Area: 2.8 acres (1.1 ha)
- Built: c.1797-c. 1805; c. 1910
- Architect: George Norton
- Architectural style: Neoclassical
- NRHP reference No.: 05001027
- Added to NRHP: September 15, 2005

Airdrie, a.k.a. Petway House or the Buell-King House, is a historic house and former plantation in Nashville, Tennessee. Built as a log house from 1797 to 1808, it was a Southern plantation with African slaves in the Antebellum era. After the American Civil War, it belonged to Union veterans.

== Location ==
It is located at 3210 Avenal Avenue in South-East Nashville, the county seat of Davidson County, Tennessee.

== History ==
The land belonged to John Foreman until it was acquired by William Coldwell in 1797. The construction of the two-story log house began in 1797, and it was completed c. 1808. It included an adjacent log cabin and a horse barn.

In 1808, Coldwell sold the house to Congressman William Dickson, who served in the United States House of Representatives from 1801 to 1807. In 1817, it was purchased by Congressman Thomas Claiborne, who served in the House of Representatives from 1817 to 1819. However, Claiborne sold the house in 1818 to Justice Gilbert Gray Washington, who served in the Tennessee Supreme Court.

In 1825, the house was purchased by Hinchey Petway (1776-1856), a merchant active in Franklin, Tennessee who remained the owner throughout the 1830s and 1840s. Today, the Hincheyville Historic District in Franklin is named for Petway. Petway added more land, coming up to 431 acres, and he owned African slaves, who worked on what was by then a Southern plantation. He lived there with his wife, Susanna Caroline Parrish Petway, and their seven children. When Petway died in 1856, the house was willed to his widow and their children. It remained in the Petway family during the Civil War.

In 1866–1867, the house was purchased by Judge John S. Brien. When he died in 1867, the house was inherited by his widow, Rochie Howard Brien (1840-1930), who lived there until her death. She shared the house with her daughter Rochie, her son-in-law, Union Colonel George P. Buell, who was General Buell's cousin and became the owner of the house, and her grandson, Don Carlos Buell II. Buell hired architect George Norton to redesign the house in the Neoclassical architectural style circa 1910. Norton added poplar weatherboard, a front porch, and a grand staircase inside the house. Meanwhile, Don Carlos Buell II married Ruth Norton, the architect's sister, and they lived in the house until the 1950s.

In 1953, Ward Allen, a Professor of English at Vanderbilt University, purchased the house from Ruth Norton Buell. He welcomed meetings of St Matthias Episcopal Church and lived here with his wife Peggy until 1958, when they sold the house to Charles Toney and his wife Josephine. In 1963, the house was purchased by R. Harold King and his wife, Dorothy. The Kings renovated the house.

== Architectural significance ==
It has been listed on the National Register of Historic Places since September 15, 2005.
