= Leftwich (surname) =

Leftwich is an English language toponymic surname. It derives from Leftwich in Cheshire, England, which was named for Leoftæt, a female name, and "wic" (in Cheshire, "saltworks").

Notable people with the surname include:

- Adrian Leftwich (1940–2013), South African anti-apartheid activist and academic
- Benjamin Francis Leftwich (born 1989), English singer-songwriter
- Brad Leftwich (born 1953), American fiddler and banjoist
- Byron Leftwich (born 1980), American football player
- Debbe Leftwich, American politician
- Jabez Leftwich (1765–1855), American politician
- Jim Leftwich (1944–2020), Australian Aboriginal bishop
- Joel Leftwich (1760–1846), American planter and politician
- John W. Leftwich (1826–1870), American politician
- Joseph Leftwich (1892–1983), English writer, poet, critic and translator
- Keith Leftwich (1954–2003), American politician
- Lloyd Leftwich (1832–1918), American politician
- Phil Leftwich (born 1969), American baseball player
- William Leftwich (c. 1737-1820), Lieutenant Colonel of the Continental Army
- William G. Leftwich, Jr. (1931–1970), United States Marine Corps officer
