= Leftwich (disambiguation) =

Leftwich is a village in Cheshire, England.

Leftwich may also refer to:

- Leftwich (surname)
- USS Leftwich (DD-984), United States Navy Spruance-class destroyer
- Leftwich House, historic house in Greenville, Ohio, United States
