= Romancoke, Virginia =

Unincorporated community in Virginia, United States

- Unincorporated community
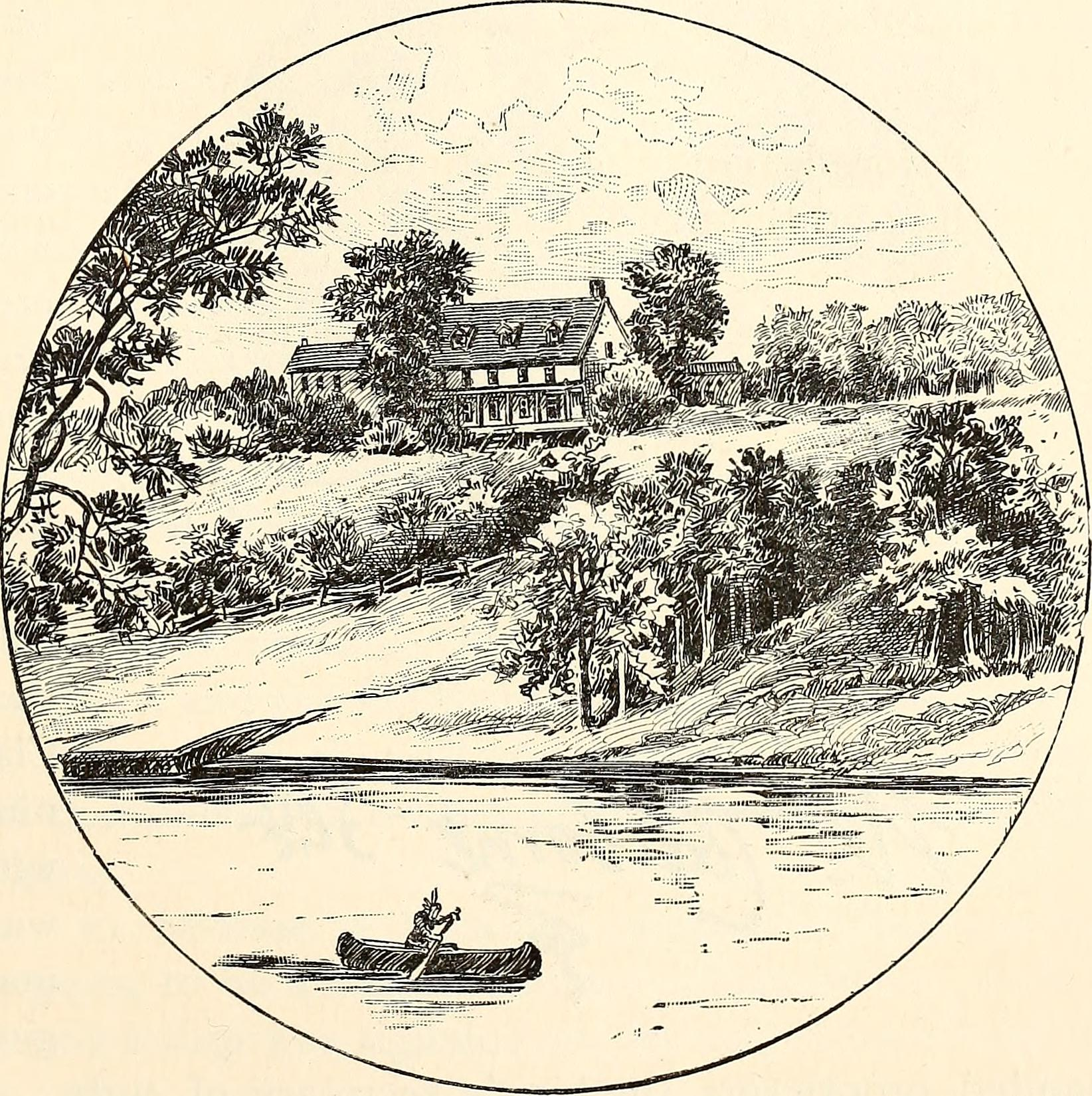
- Illustration of the Romancoke property in King William County

- Location within Virginia and the United States Romancoke (the United States)
- Coordinates: 37°34′25″N 76°51′02″W
- Country: United States
- State: Virginia
- County: King William
- Time zone: UTC−5 (Eastern (EST))
  - Summer (DST): UTC−4 (EDT)

Romancoke is an unincorporated community in King William County, Virginia, United States. Romancoke was a plantation initially developed by William Claiborne in the 17th century, and inherited by his burgess sons William Claiborne Jr. then Thomas Claiborne.

Eventually, in the early 19th century, George Washington Parke Custis, father of Mary Anna Randolph Custis Lee (wife of Gen. Robert E. Lee) inherited Romancoke Plantation, as well as Arlington and White House Plantations. His will appointed Gen. Lee as executor, and directed him to manumit approximately 200 slaves within five years of his death (which happened in 1857). The American Civil War and Emancipation Proclamation intervened, but Gen. Lee fulfilled the clause by December, 1862. Lee's second son, Rooney Lee, managed both White House plantation and nearby Romancoke after resigning his U.S. Army commission. His youngest son, Robert E. Lee, Jr., inherited Romancoke and after the war took up residence (about four miles from West Point).
