= Owen Chapel Church of Christ =

Historic church in Tennessee, United States

- U.S. National Register of Historic Places
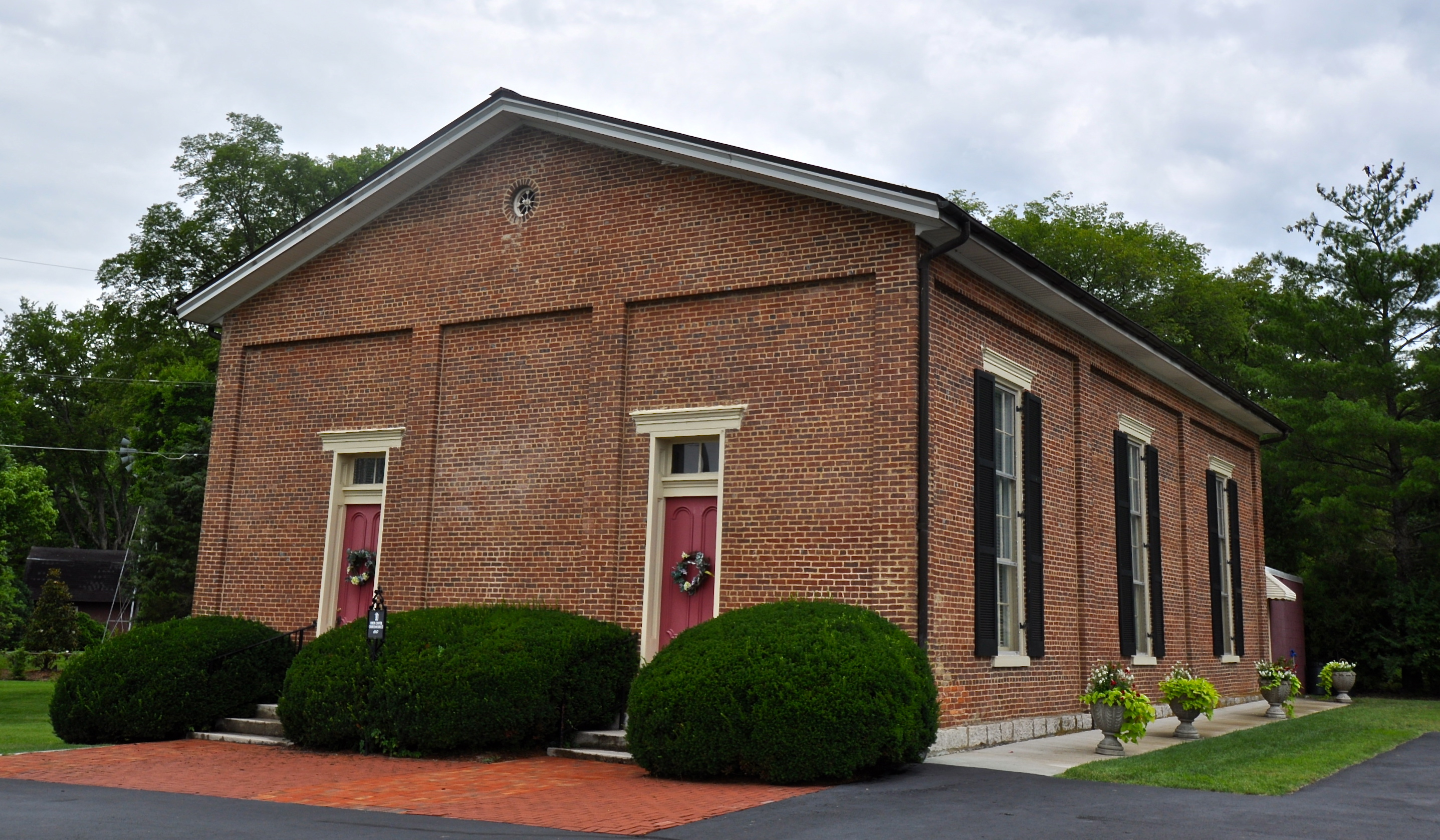
- Owen Chapel Church of Christ, June 2014.

- Location within Tennessee Location within the United States
- Location: 1101 Franklin Rd., Brentwood, Tennessee
- Coordinates: 36°0′0″N 86°49′14″W
- Area: 1.4 acres (0.57 ha)
- Built: c. 1860
- Architectural style: Greek Revival, Vernacular Greek Revival
- NRHP reference No.: 86002914
- Added to NRHP: October 23, 1986

The Owen Chapel Church of Christ is a property in Brentwood, Tennessee that was built c. 1860 and that was listed on the National Register of Historic Places in 1986. It includes Greek Revival and "Vernacular Greek Revival" architecture.

As of 1988, it was one of only two brick churches in Williamson County that were built before the American Civil War and survived, besides churches in the city of Franklin. The other one outside of Franklin, the Harpeth Presbyterian Church, had been extensively altered and was not eligible for NRHP listing.

Churches of this era and architectural style commonly had two separate entrances, as Owen Chapel does, corresponding to a central division among the pews on the interior. This initially served the function of separating the congregation by gender, and in some churches the same features were later used to accomplish racial segregation.

== See also ==
- St. Paul's Episcopal Church (Franklin, Tennessee), NRHP-listed, a fine church architecturally
