= Archibald Stuart =

American politician (1795–1855)

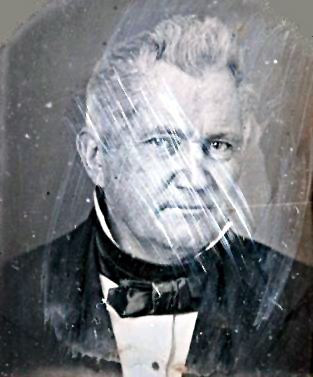

Member of the U.S. House of Representatives from Virginia's 7th district
- In office March 4, 1837 - March 3, 1839
- Preceded by: Nathaniel Claiborne
- Succeeded by: William L. Goggin

Member of the Virginia Senate from Henry, Patrick and Franklin Counties
- In office 1852–1855
- Preceded by: District created
- Succeeded by: George Hairston

Personal details
- Born: December 2, 1795 Lynchburg, Virginia
- Died: September 20, 1855 (aged 59) "Laurel Hill", Patrick County, Virginia
- Resting place: Saltville, Virginia
- Party: Democratic
- Education: College of William & Mary
- Occupation: planter, lawyer

Archibald Stuart (December 2, 1795 – September 20, 1855) was a nineteenth-century politician and lawyer from Virginia. He was the first cousin of Alexander Hugh Holmes Stuart and the father of Confederate General James Ewell Brown "Jeb" Stuart, who was the seventh of eleven children.

== Early life ==
Archibald Stuart was born in Lynchburg, Virginia to Anne Dabney Stuart and Alexander Stuart, a judge and politician who had previously served in both houses of the Virginia General Assembly. Stuart received a private education suitable to his class, before attending the College of William & Mary from c. 1777 to 1780.

== Career ==
He became an officer in the War of 1812, before studying to become a lawyer after the War's close. Following his admission to the Virginia bar, Stuart opened his law practice in Lynchburg, VA. He was elected to the Virginia Constitutional Convention of 1829-1830.

Stuart was elected a Democrat to the United States House of Representatives in 1836, serving from 1837 to 1839. After losing reelection to Isaac Adams, Stuart resumed practicing law.

In 1850-51 he served in the Virginia Constitutional Convention of 1850. He served to the Virginia Senate, serving from 1852 to 1854.

== Death and legacy ==
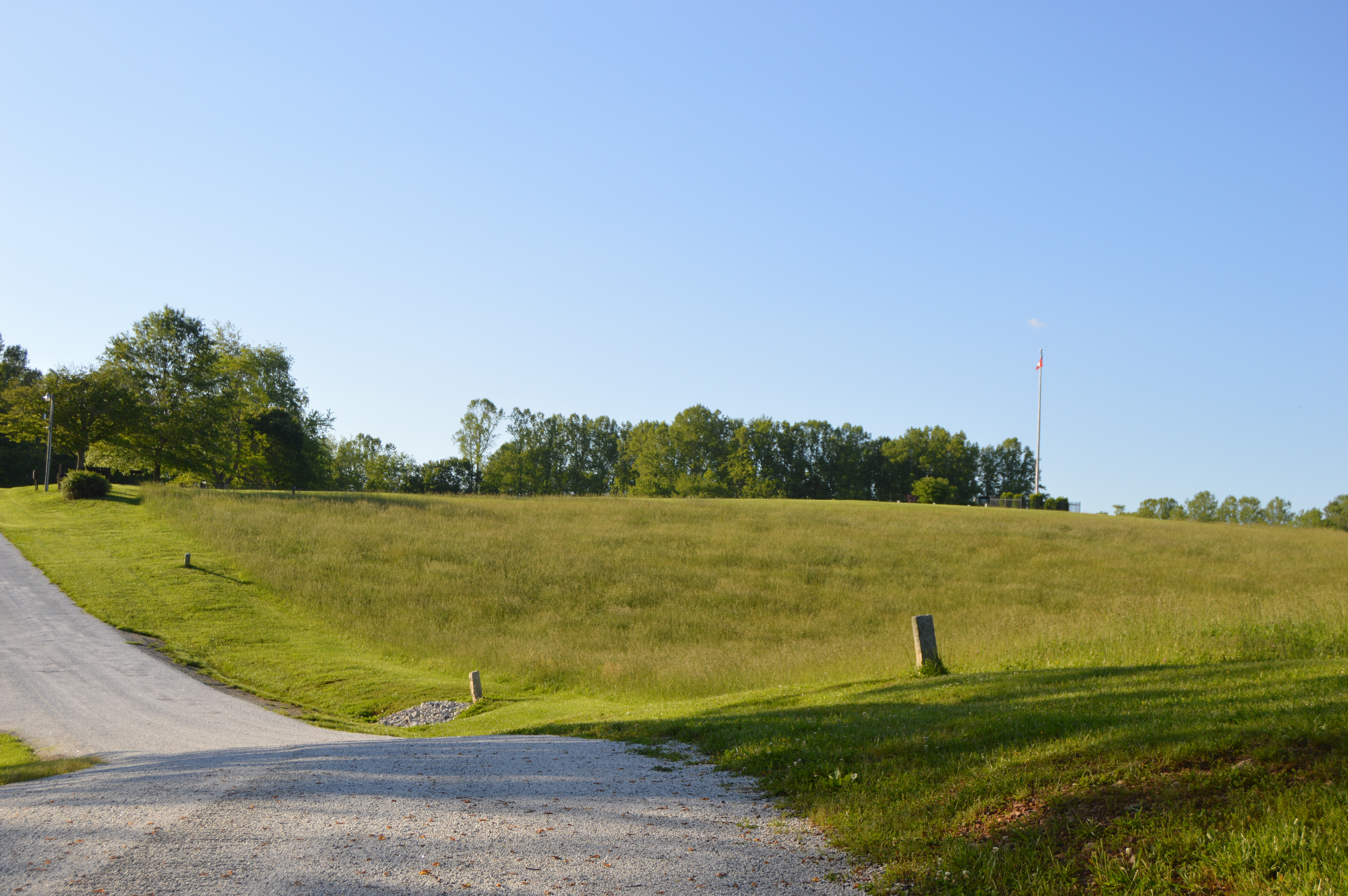
Overview of Laurel Hill; Stuart was buried by the tree at far left

Stuart died suddenly at his home, "Laurel Hill" in Patrick County, Virginia, on September 20, 1855. He was interred in the Stuart family cemetery at Laurel Hill. His son J.E.B. Stuart, who had graduated from the U.S. Military Academy in 1854 to start his military career, resigned his U.S. Army commission to join the Confederate States Army, eventually commanding the Cavalry Corps of the Army of Northern Virginia with the rank of Major General before his combat-related death in 1864. In 1859, this man's widow, Elizabeth Letcher Pannill Stuart, whose ancestor William Lechter had founded the plantation and died there (killed by a Tory sympathizer in 1780) sold Laurel Hill (including the plantation house rebuilt after an 1847/8 fire) to two men from North Carolina. In 1952 the Stuart family re-interred this man's remains in Saltville (in Smyth and Washington Counties, Virginia), next to his widow, although the family members (as well as slaves) may still be interred at Laurel Hill. In 1991, Laurel Hill was preserved by the J.E.B. Stuart Birthplace Trust, and added to the National Register of Historic Places in 1998.

== Electoral history ==
- 1837; Stuart was elected to the U.S. House of Representatives with 56.08% of the vote, defeating Whig Nathaniel H. Claiborne.
- 1839; Stuart lost his re-election bid.

== Bibliography ==
- "Biographical Directory of the United States Congress, 1774 - Present". bioguide.congress.gov. United States Congress.
- Pulliam, David Loyd (1901). The Constitutional Conventions of Virginia from the foundation of the Commonwealth to the present time. John T. West, Richmond. ISBN 978-1-2879-2059-5.

U.S. House of Representatives
Preceded by Nathaniel Claiborne	Member of the U.S. House of Representatives from Virginia's 7th congressional district 1837–1839	Succeeded by William L. Goggin
