= List of Maryland colonists =

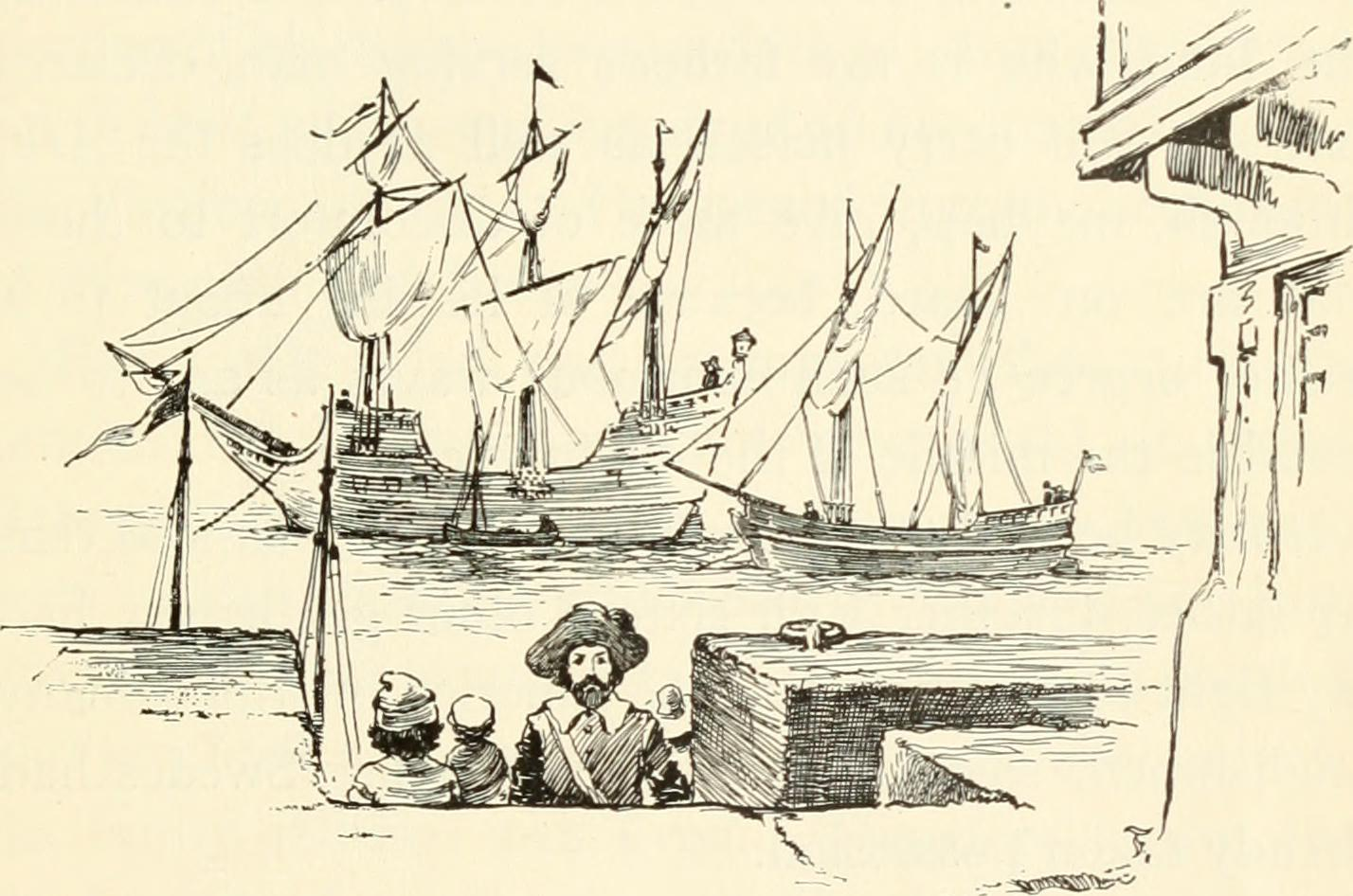
Illustration of the Ark (left) and the Dove (right)

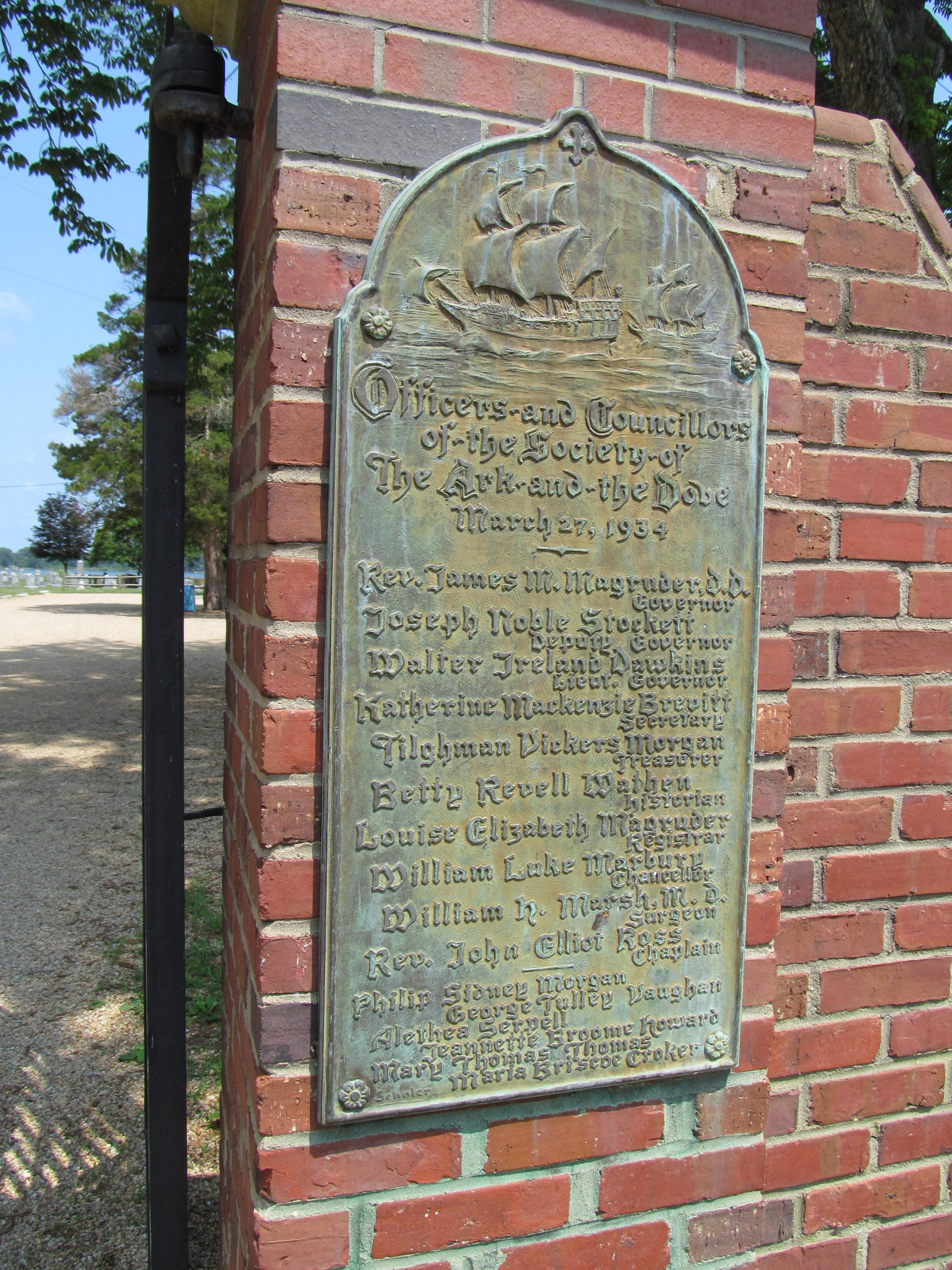
Plaque in St. Mary's City, Maryland

In November 1633, Ark and Dove departed England with 100 to 300 settlers.

Using the trade winds to the Antilles islands, they arrived at Point Comfort, Virginia in February 1634 [O.S. February 1633], then landed on St. Clement's Island, Maryland on April 4 [O.S. March 25] 1634.

== Original colonists (1633) ==
Passengers aboard the Ark

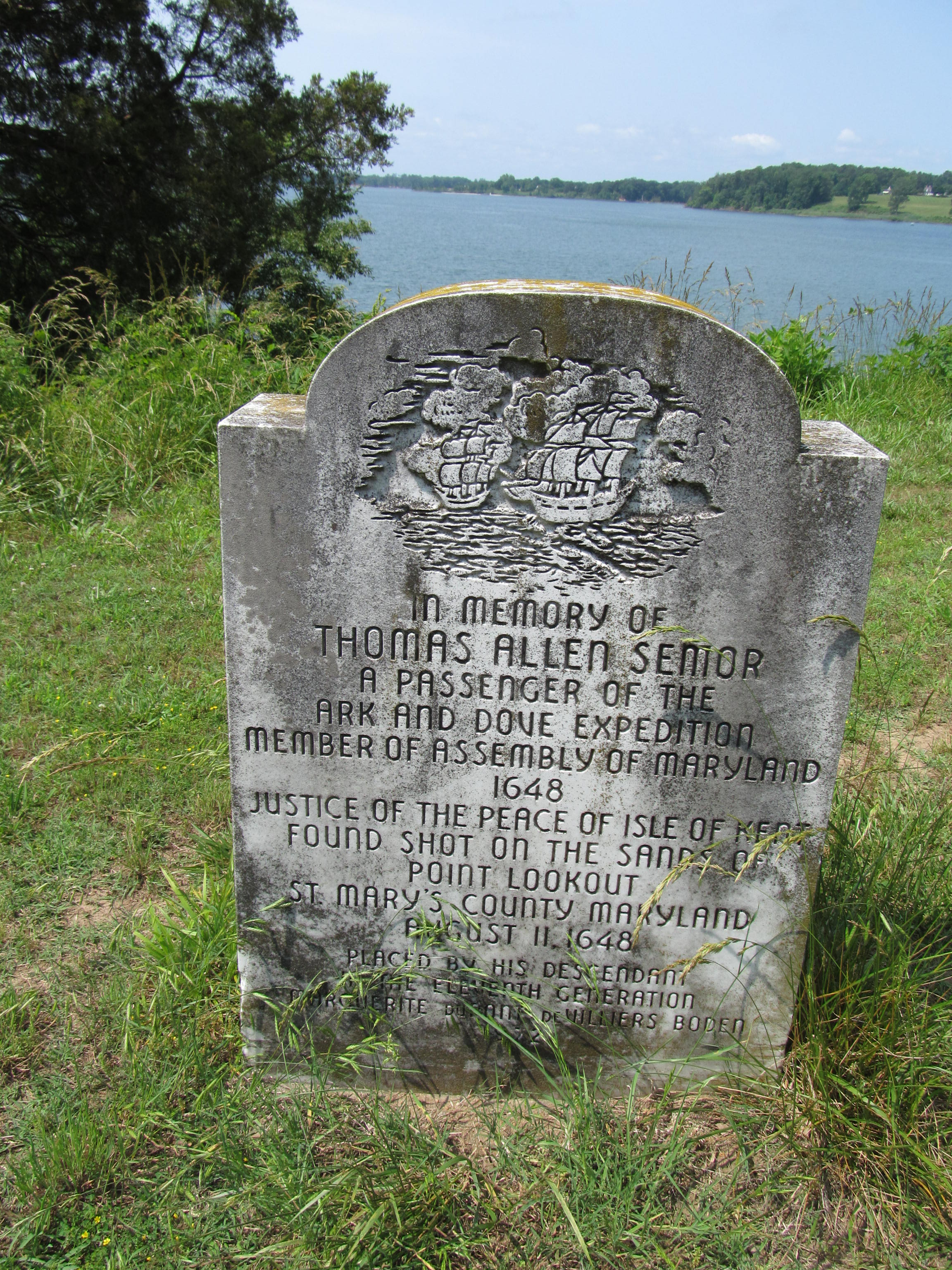
Cenotaph of Thomas Allen, Senior, in St. Mary's City, Maryland

1. Anne, servant of Jerome Hawley
2. Thomas Allen, Senior (d. 1648)
3. John Altham (alias Gravener), SJ
4. William Andrews, gentleman
5. John Ashmore
6. William Ashmore
7. James Barefoote, gentleman (d. 1633 en route)
8. John Baxter, Esq.
9. Ralph Bean
10. Thomas Beckwith, servant of Thomas Cornwaleys
11. Anon Benham, servant of Thomas Greene
12. Henry Bishop (Briscoe)
13. John Boles, secretary of Cecil Calvert, 2nd Baron Baltimore
14. Richard Bradley
15. John Briant
16. William Browne
17. Matthew Burrows
18. George Calvert II, Esq. (1613-1634), third son of George Calvert, 1st Baron Baltimore
19. Leonard Calvert
20. Christopher Carnell
21. Thomas Carrington
22. Richard Cole
23. John Cook
24. Thomas Cooper
25. Thomas Cornwallis, commissioner
26. Ann Cox, gentlewoman (d. 1638)
27. Edward Cranfield
28. Thomas Dorrell, Esq.
29. Peter Draper, secretary of Leonard Calvert
30. Richard Duke
31. Robert Edwards
32. William Edwin
33. John Elbin
34. Nicholas Fairfax, Esq., of Sand Hutton Grange, Yorkshire (d. 1633 en route), investor
35. Cuthbert Fenwick, Esq.
36. William Fitter, gentleman
37. Captain Henry Fleete, gentleman (passenger)
38. Francisco, servant of Fr. Andrew White
39. Lewis Fremond
40. Richard Gerard, Esq., of Ince, Lancashire, investor
41. Thomas Gervase (d. 1637)
42. Richard Gilbert
43. Stephen Gore
44. Henry Green
45. Thomas Greene
46. Thomas Griston
47. John Halfhead
48. John Hallows (Hollis/Hallis), gentleman (d. 1657)
49. Nicholas Harvey, gentleman (d. 1647)
50. Jerome Hawley, Esq., of St. Martin-in-the-Fields, Middlesex (1590-1638), investor and co-author of A Relation of Maryland (1635), commissioner
51. Thomas Heath
52. Captain John Hill, gentleman
53. John Hilles
54. John Hillard
55. Richard Hills
56. James Hockley
57. Benjamin Hodges, servant of John Saunders
58. John Holderen, servant of Thomas Cornwaleys
59. Henry James
60. Mary Jennings, servant of Fr. Andrew White
61. Josiah, servant of Thomas Cornwaleys
62. John Knowles
63. William Lewis
64. Richard Loe, servant of Thomas Cornwaleys
65. Richard Lusthead
66. John Marlburgh
67. Christopher Martin
68. John Medcalf
69. Charles Middleton
70. Roger Morgan
71. Thomas Munns
72. John Neville
73. Richard Nevitt, ward of John Saunders
74. John Norton, the elder
75. John Norton, the younger
76. Robert Pike
77. Black John Price
78. White John Price
79. Lodwick Price
80. Francis Rabnett, gentleman
81. John Robinson
82. Francis Rogers
83. William Sayre (Saire), Esq.
84. Stephen Salmon, servant of Thomas Cornwaleys
85. John Saunders, Esq., co-owner of the Dove and investor (d. 1634)
86. Robert Sherley, servant of Fr. Andrew White
87. Robert Simpson
88. Robert Smith
89. Thomas Smith
90. William Smith
91. Matthias de Sousa
92. Thomas Stratham
93. James Thornton
94. Cyprian Thorowgood, gentleman
95. Robert Vaughan, gentleman
96. Roger Walter
97. John Ward
98. Evans Watkins, servant of Leonard Calvert
99. John Wells
100. Andrew White, SJ
101. Frederick Wintour, Esq., of Lydney, Gloucestershire, investor
102. Robert Henry Wiseman, Esq. (d. c. 1634), investor

Crew aboard the Ark

- Capt. Robert Wintour, Esq., of Lydney, Gloucestershire, Commander of the Ark
- Capt. Richard Lowe, Master of the Ark, of Ratcliffe, Middlesex (d. 1638)
- Capt. William Humber
- John Bowlter (Boulter), purser and steward
- Richard Edwards, chirurgeon
- Justinian Snow, factor (agent)

Crew aboard the Dove

- Capt. John Curie (Curke), Master of the Dove (d. c. 1634 en route)
- Capt. Richard Orchard, Master of the Dove, of Wapping, Middlesex
- Nicholas Perry (Perrie), quartermaster, of Isle of Wight
- John Games, gunner, of Ratcliffe, Middlesex
- Richard Kempton (Kenton), boatswain, of Tower Wharf, London
- Samuel Lawson, mate
- Mr. Warrelow, mate
- Michael Perril, servant to the Master

== Other colonists ==
- John Lewger, on the Unitie, November 1637
  - Ann Lewger
  - John Lewger, Jr.
- Giles Brent, on the Elizabeth, 1637

== See also ==
- List of proprietors of Maryland
- List of Jamestown colonists
- List of Mayflower passengers
