= John Claiborne =

American politician

Member of the U.S. House of Representatives from Virginia's 17th district
- In office March 4, 1805 – October 9, 1808
- Preceded by: Thomas Claiborne
- Succeeded by: Thomas Gholson, Jr.

Personal details
- Born: January 26, 1778 Brunswick County, Virginia
- Died: October 9, 1808 (aged 30) Brunswick County, Virginia
- Party: Democratic-Republican
- Education: University of Pennsylvania

John Claiborne (January 26, 1778 – October 9, 1808) was a son of Thomas Claiborne (1749–1812) and brother of Thomas Claiborne (1780–1856). He was a representative from Virginia; born in Brunswick County, Virginia in 1778; pursued academic studies; graduated from the medical department of the University of Pennsylvania in Philadelphia in 1798 and practiced; elected as a Democratic-Republican to the Ninth and Tenth Congresses and served from March 4, 1805, until his death in Brunswick County, Virginia, on October 9, 1808; interment in the family burying ground of Parson Jarratt, Dinwiddie, Virginia.

== See also ==
- List of members of the United States Congress who died in office (1790–1899)

U.S. House of Representatives
Preceded by Thomas Claiborne	Member of the U.S. House of Representatives from Virginia's 17th congressional district 1805-1808	Succeeded by Thomas Gholson, Jr.
