= Thomas Cornwallis =

English colonial councillor in Maryland

Captain Thomas Cornwallis
- Born: c. 1605
- Died: c. 1675 (aged 69–70)
- Resting place: Church of St Mary, Erwarton, Suffolk
- Other name: Cornwaleys
- Relatives: William Cornwallis (father or brother); Charles Cornwallis

Signature
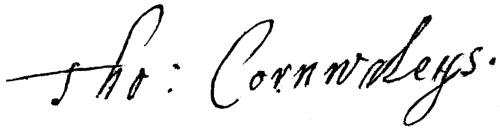

Thomas Cornwallis (or Cornwaleys, b. c. 1605 – d. c. 1675) was an English politician and colonial administrator. Cornwallis served as one of the first Commissioners of the Province of Maryland (Proprietary Colony of Maryland), and Captain of the colony's military during the early years of settlement. In a 1638 naval engagement with Virginian colonists, he captured Kent Island in Maryland.

== Life ==
Thomas was related (Note: Since Ambassador Sir Charles Cornwallis' first wife, Ann Fincham, was buried 4 Apr 1584, Fincham, Norfolk, the above Thomas, if born in 1605, would have to have been the son of Charles' second wife, Anne Barrow (d. 1617). However, the contemporaneous Cornwallis pedigree by Lady Jane Cornwallis (Sister-in-Law of Ambassador Charles) shows Charles and Jane as having only 1 daughter, Anne Cornwallis, and no other children from this marriage are shown in contemporary records. The Lady Jane Cornwallis pedigree also shows the Thomas Cornwallis, son of Ambassador Cornwallis and his first wife, Elizabeth Fincham (therefore, born before 1584), as being of Ordsall, County of Nottinghamshire in 1634, and marrying Anne Bevercotes. It is more likely that the above Thomas who accompanied Leonard Calvert to Maryland was Thomas Cornwallis, a grandson of Ambassador Sir Charles, and the son of Charles' eldest son, William the Essayist/author d.1614 impoverished, whose eldest son, Charles, was born abt. 1600 (d. ca 1662; Will proved P.C.C. 3 Jan 1663; mentions bro. Philip et al.). The Lady Jane Cornwallis pedigree shows Thomas, 2nd son of William, the Essayist, as being of Burnham Thorpe, Norfolk, and leaving a Will dated 12 Jan. 1675, proved 4 March 1676, which matches the return of the above Thomas to England where he died "at some point after 4 March 1675." There was an inscription in the chancel of the church at Burnham Thorpe, extant in 1890, for: "Philip Cornwaleys, Rector, youngest son of Sir William Cornwaleys, Kt. [the Essayist], 1680.""Pedigree of Cornwallis. From the Records of the College of Arms, Wills, Registers, and other authorities." The Private Correspondence of Jane Lady Cornwallis; 1613-1644. From the Originals in the Possession of the Family; pp. xxxii- London; Printed and Sold by S. & J. Bentley, Wilson, & Fley, Bangor House, Shoe Lane. 1842. See Library of Congress [most reprints do not include the genealogical charts]. Text, page vii, includes the following recognition: "The Editor is extremely indebted to the kindness of his friends J. Gae Rokewode, Esq. and C. G. Young, Esq. York Herald, for the pedigrees of the Cornwallis and Meutys families, inserted at the end of the Memoirs, which, by their diligence and research, have been rendered much more complete and correct than any before existing in a manuscript or printed form.... The Editor further feels bound to offer his best thanks to the different Clergymen to whom he has had occasion to refer for extracts from their parochial Registers; and it is gratifying to him to be enabled to add, that in every instance he received the most obliging answers, and in some cases much useful information." "Audley End, June 30, 1842." On page iii is an additional comment: "The Correspondence contained in the following pages formed a portion of a large mass of MS. papers found amongst the family archives at Brome and Culford, after the lamented death of Charles, second and last Marquis Cornwallis, in 1823, and which were placed, by his daughters and coheirs, at the disposal of the Editor. The letters, all belonging to the seventeenth century, were principally addressed to the widow of Sir William Cornwallis [the elder brother of Ambassador Sir Charles], who, remarrying Sir Nathaniel Bacon, subsequently assumed the name of her second husband, and many of them emanated from the pens of her female friends and relatives....") to Sir Charles Cornwallis of Beeston, Norfolk (d. 1629), who was an ambassador to Spain and the brother of both Elizabeth Cornwallis and Sir William Cornwallis of Brome. Sir William was the direct ancestor of Charles Cornwallis, 1st Marquess Cornwallis. Thomas was probably the son (or the brother) of the author William Cornwallis.

As the second son, he did not hope to inherit his father's land. The Cornwallis family were Roman Catholic Recusants, and therefore, George Calvert's project of an autonomous colony in the New World of English Catholics appealed to Thomas.

Thomas Cornwallis sailed with Leonard Calvert from England to Maryland, not Virginia, as one of the original Commissioners of the colony. King Charles I signed the charter of Maryland in 1632, making George Calvert and his heirs Proprietors of Maryland. It was George Calvert's son, Cecil Calvert, who signed the charter, second Lord Baltimore, and received the province of Maryland from King Charles I. However, the English civil war between Parliament and Charles I, left the possession of the Maryland Province in question. Kent Island was part of the land owned by one William Claiborne of Virginia. He resented that his land had been included in the grant to Lord Baltimore and refused to submit to Maryland's Authority. Cornwallis was involved in several Naval battles over Kent Island in 1635, and in 1638, he led an expedition that took control of the island for the Calvert family.

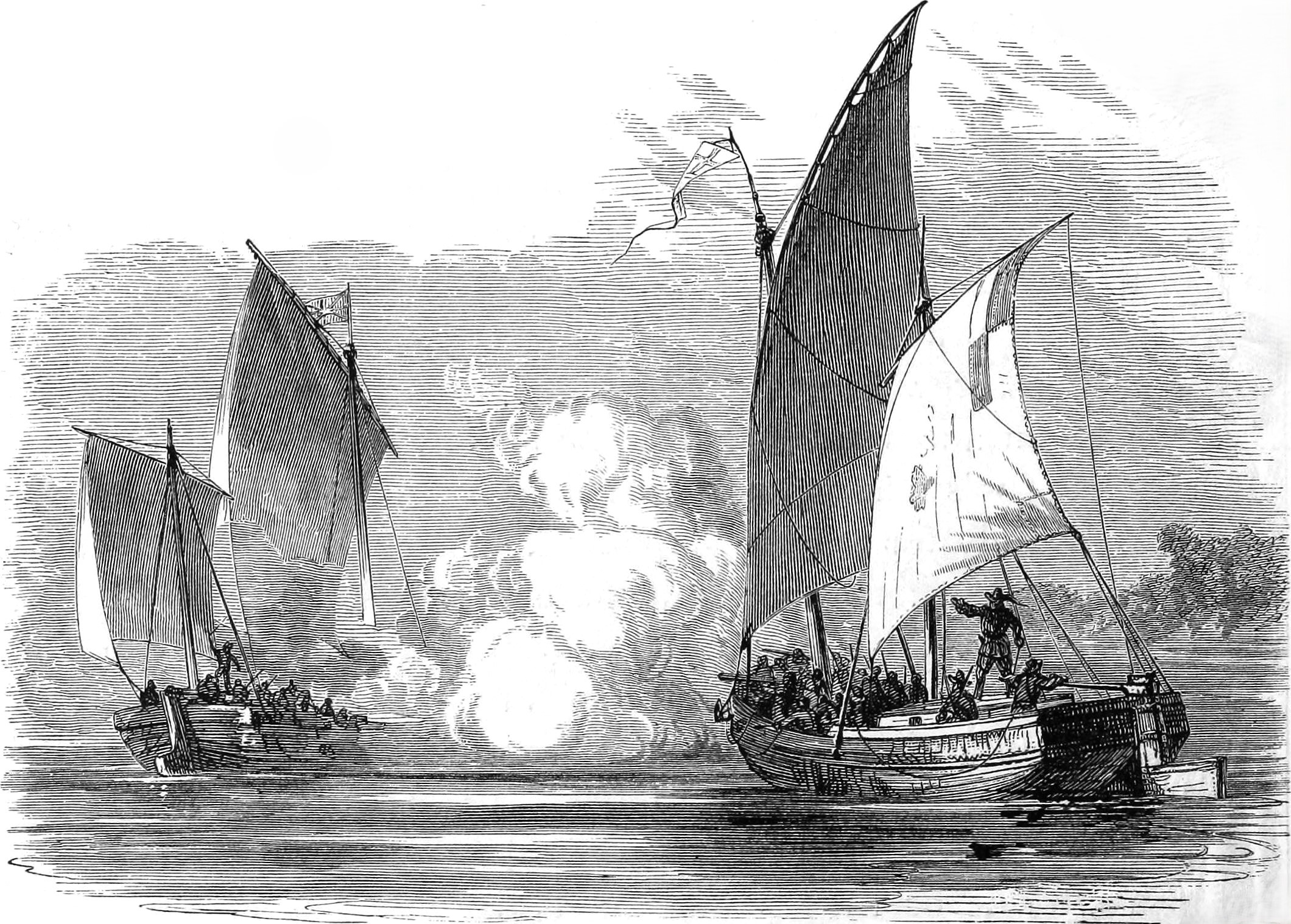
Battle between William Claiborne's men and Thomas Cornwallis of Maryland, 1635

In 1634, he accompanied Leonard Calvert to what was then Virginia, and became a Commissioner to the Governor. This put him in a powerful advisory position to Leonard Calvert. In 1635, Cornwallis fought the Virginian colonist William Claiborne and his allies over the jurisdiction of Kent Island, and captured it in 1638. In 1643, he defended the colony against a Native American attack.

In 1644, Richard Ingle sailed into Chesapeake Bay with his ship, Reformation, and fired on St. Mary's City. Cornwallis' land was occupied and many of the buildings he had constructed were destroyed. As a result of these losses and his loss of influence in the colony, Cornwallis returned to England, where he died at some point after 4 March 1675. The tombs of Cornwallis and his wife Penelope are inside St. Mary's Church in Erwarton.

== See also ==
- List of Maryland colonists
