= St. Paul's Episcopal Church (Franklin, Tennessee) =

Historic church in Tennessee, United States

- U.S. National Register of Historic Places
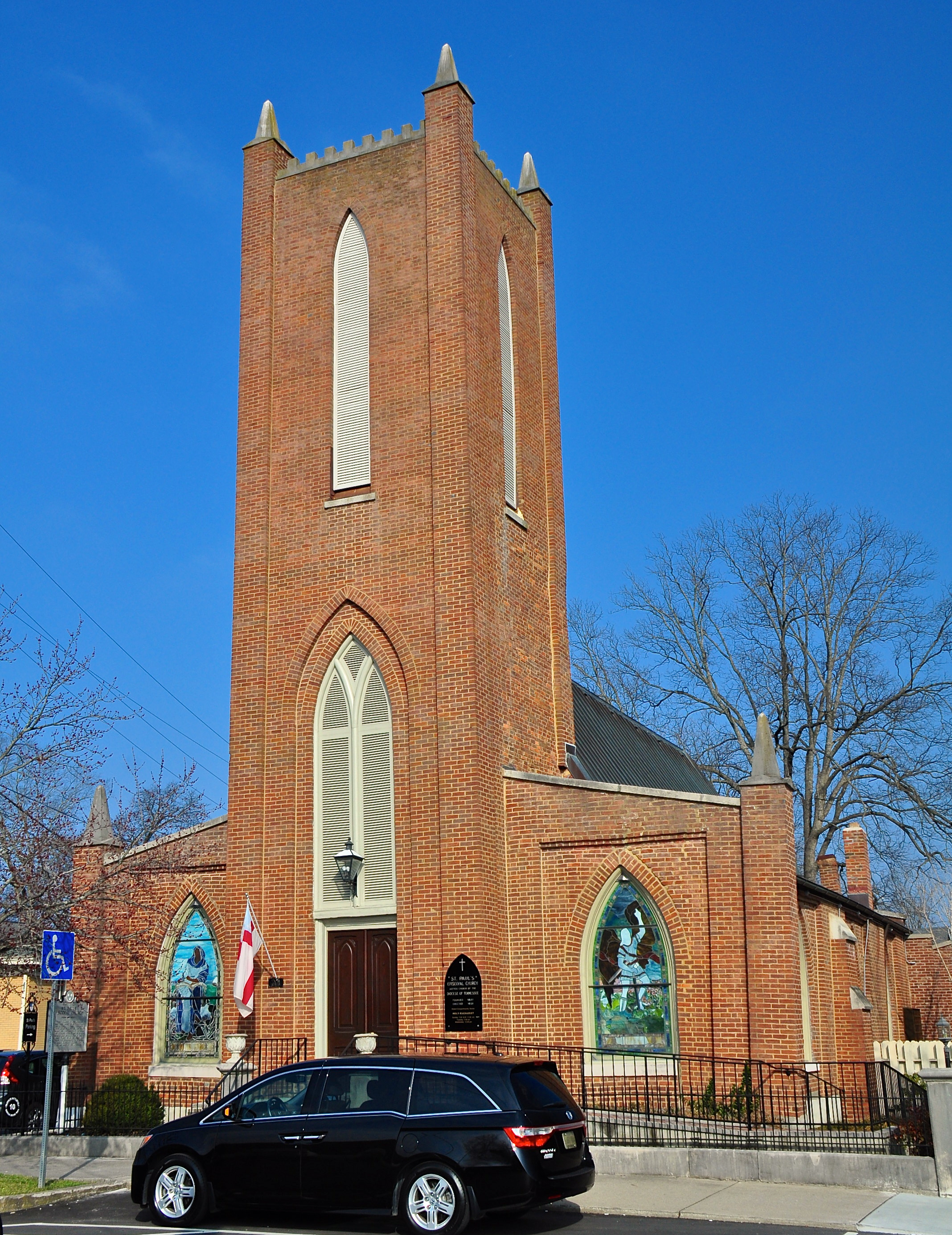
- St. Paul's Episcopal Church, March 2014.

- Location within Tennessee Location within the United States
- Location: 510 Main St., Franklin, Tennessee
- Coordinates: 35°55′25″N 86°52′21″W
- Area: 2 acres (0.81 ha)
- Built: 1831
- NRHP reference No.: 72001255
- Added to NRHP: February 23, 1972

St. Paul's Episcopal Church is a historic church in Franklin, Tennessee, that was listed on the National Register of Historic Places in 1972. In 1988, a National Register study of Williamson County historical resources described it as "one of the finest remaining" Gothic Revival style churches in middle Tennessee. The building was completed in 1834.

It is included in the Hincheyville Historic District, also listed on the National Register. St. Paul's is a parish of the Episcopal Diocese of Tennessee, in fact the diocese's (and state's) oldest congregation.

When Federals occupied Franklin TN in 1863,they took St. Paul's Episcopal church as a stable for their horses. They burned the hand carved staircases, pews, balcony railings, and the mahogany pipe organ for firewood. The Yankees notched the interior supporting columns with swords and axes.

== See also ==
- Owen Chapel Church of Christ, the only antebellum brick church in the county, outside of Franklin, that survives with historic integrity
