= Samuel Goode (American politician) =

American politician

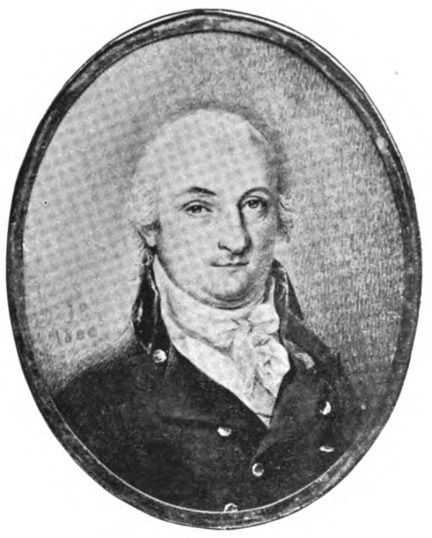

Member of the U.S. House of Representatives from Virginia's 8th district
- In office March 4, 1799 – March 3, 1801
- Preceded by: Thomas Claiborne
- Succeeded by: Thomas Claiborne

Member of the Virginia House of Delegates from Mecklenburg County
- In office 1778–1781; Alongside Henry Delony, Robert Munford and Lewis Burwell
- In office 1783–1784; Alongside Thomas Pettus and William Randolph

Personal details
- Born: March 21, 1756 Chesterfield County, Virginia Colony, British America
- Died: November 14, 1822 (aged 66) Mecklenburg County, Virginia, U.S.
- Party: Democratic-Republican

Military service
- Allegiance: United States of America
- Branch/service: Virginia militia
- Rank: Colonel
- Battles/wars: American Revolutionary War

Samuel Goode (March 21, 1756 – November 14, 1822) was a United States representative from Virginia. Born in "Whitby" in Chesterfield County in the Colony of Virginia, he completed preparatory studies, studied law, was admitted to the bar and practiced. During the American Revolutionary War he served as a lieutenant in the Chesterfield Troop of Horse and later as a colonel of militia. He was a member of the Virginia House of Delegates from 1778 to 1785, and was elected as a Democratic-Republican to the Sixth Congress, serving from March 4, 1799, to March 3, 1801. After leaving Congress, Goode returned to law, along with managing his land.

His son was Dr. Thomas Goode, who was later the owner and operator of the Homestead spa.

He died in Invermay, Mecklenburg County; interment was on his estate near Invermay.

U.S. House of Representatives
Preceded by Thomas Claiborne	Member of the U.S. House of Representatives from Virginia's 8th congressional district 1799–1801	Succeeded by Thomas Claiborne
