= Joel Leftwich =

American politician (1760–1846)

Member of the Virginia House of Delegates from Bedford County
- In office October 1, 1792–November 10, 1794 Serving with David Saunders
- Preceded by: John Trigg
- Succeeded by: Samuel Hancock

Personal details
- Born: November 22, 1760 Bedford County, Virginia
- Died: April 20, 1846 (aged 85) Bedford County, Virginia
- Party: Democratic-Republican
- Relations: Jabez Leftwich (brother)

Military service
- Branch/service: Virginia militia
- Rank: Brigadier General
- Battles/wars: American Revolutionary War: Battle of Germantown; Battle of Camden; Battle of Guilford Court House; War of 1812: Old Northwest Campaign; Chesapeake Campaign

Joel Leftwich (November 22, 1760 – April 20, 1846) was an American planter and politician, who also served as brigadier general of the Virginia militia in the War of 1812 and twice represented Bedford County in the Virginia House of Delegates.

== Early and family life ==
Born in Bedford County, where his father, Augustine Leftwich(1712-1795), operated a plantation. His father had moved westward from New Kent County in Virginia's Tidewater region into the Piedmont after securing a royal land grant, and married at least twice. He had several older brothers and half brothers, most of whom also distinguished themselves in the military, but the most accomplished politician of the lot was the youngest brother Jabez Leftwich, who served under him during the War of 1812 and would later serve two terms in the U.S. House of Representatives as well as in the Virginia House of Delegates and Alabama House of Representatives. Their elder brothers included Ltc. William Leftwich (1737-1820), Col. Thomas Leftwich (1740-1816), Augustine Leftwich Jr. (1744-1835), Capt. Uriah Leftwich (1748-1838), Capt. John Leftwich (1750-1797) and Col. Littleberry Leftwich (1757-1823). The family also included two daughters who married: Ann Petross Leftwich Hackworth (1731-1820) married a veteran of the French and Indian War, and Mary Elizabeth Leftwich Early (1746-1818) married Joshua Early and had a son Rev. John Early who became a Methodist preacher and for 19 years of bishop of the Methodist Episcopal Church South. The youngest brother, Jabez Leftwich, served under him during the War of 1812, as described below, then continued a political career that included terms in the U.S. House of Representatives and Alabama House of Representatives.

Joel Leftwich married Nancy Turner (1761-1822) and had a son John (known as "Captain Jack") Leftwich (1783-1833) who became a tobacco broker in Lynchburg.

== Military service ==
Although his elder brothers were officers, Leftwich remained in the enlisted ranks during the Revolutionary War. He fought at the battles of Germantown, Camden and Guilford Court House, where he was wounded.

Following the war, Leftwich served in the Virginia Militia, as was required of all white men at the time. He became an officer, and ultimately rose to the rank of Brigadier General of the Virginia militia, after serving under General (and future President) William Henry Harrison during the War of 1812.

Leftwich's Northwestern Brigade initially consisted of the county militias of Mason, Cabell, Kanawha, Greenbrier, Hampshire, Ohio, Wood and Monongalia Counties (all of which decades later became West Virginia). The two regiments were commanded by Col. John Connell of Brooke County and Col. Dudley Evans of Monongalia County. Virginia Governor Barbour instructed them to defend the Ohio Valley, augmenting the command of Gen. Harrison. They replaced troops surrendered at Detroit by General Hull that summer. The Virginians convened at Point Pleasant on the Ohio River on October 16, 1812, and were joined by a Pennsylvania brigade in November. They arrived at Upper Sandusky, Ohio on December 18, 1812, and at Fort Meigs on January 21, 1813 (which defended the Maumee valley). However the 6 month enlistments had expired by April, so only the Petersburg Volunteers (not under Leftwich's command) remained when the main British and Indian attacks on Ft. Meigs began in the spring.

Leftwich's 2nd Brigade the following winter was stationed at Camp Mims near Richmond. Its regiments were led by Lt.Col. William Dickinson and Lt.Col. WIlliam C. Greenhill's regimentsof men from Bedford, Campbell, Pittsylvania, Halifax and Charlotte Counties. Those from Bedford County were led by relatives Capt. Joshua Early and Lt. Nicodemus Leftwich.

As the British fleet continued in Chesapeake Bay after burning the national capital, Virginia's Governor Barbour dispatched additional troops to defend the Baltimore area on October 6, 1814. During the Maryland campaign, the 2nd Virginia proceeded to Charles County, Maryland, where they arrived at Camp Snowden on October 27, 1814. They moved to Capp Eichtenberger in Ann Arundel County on November 3, 1814, and on to Camp Crossroads, just outside Ellicott's Mills by November 9, 1814. However, they saw no further action. Leftwich's promotions continued after the conflict, when he became major general in charge of the state militia.

== Career ==
Bedford County voters elected Leftwich to represent them twice in the Virginia House of Delegates, in 1792 and 1793. After a brief gap, his brother won election and re-election to that part-time position.

Leftwich also served as a justice of the peace in Bedford County, the justices jointly administering the county in this era.

Leftwich farmed using enslaved labor, as did his father and brothers. In the 1810 census, he owned 10 enslaved people. A decade later, he owned three and 23 slaves in Bedford county's southern district. In 1830 he owned five and six slaves, in two farms in the district.

== Death and legacy ==
Leftwich died in Bedford County on April 29, 1826. The University of Virginia has some of the Leftwich family papers.
