= Hincheyville Historic District =

Historic district in Tennessee, United States

- U.S. National Register of Historic Places
- U.S. Historic district
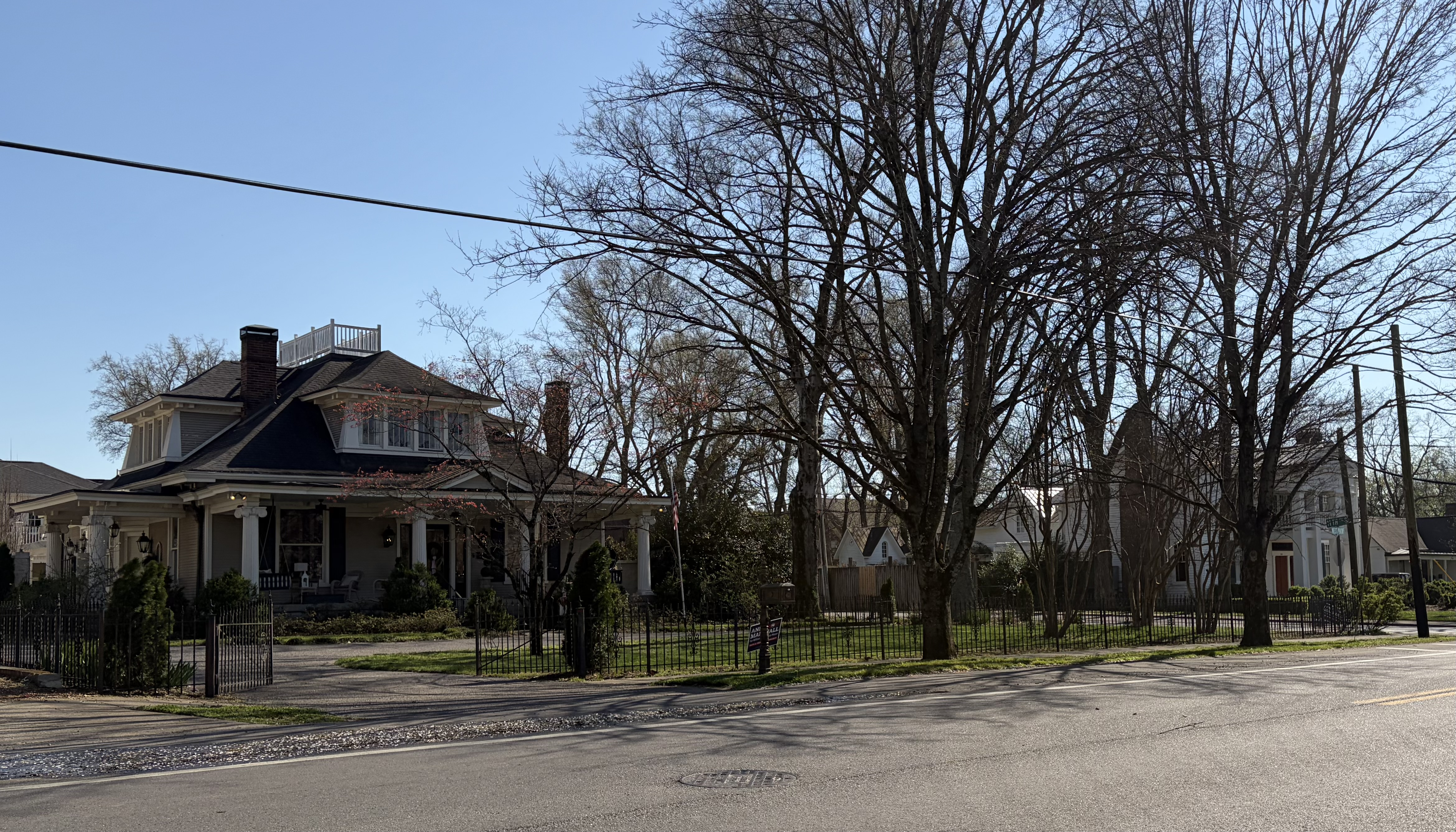
- Houses within the historic district on W. Main Street

- Location within Tennessee Location within the United States
- Location: W. Main, Fair, 6th, 7th, 8th, 9th, and 10th Sts., Franklin, Tennessee
- Coordinates: 35°55′21″N 86°52′34″W
- Area: 53 acres (21 ha)
- Architect: Multiple
- Architectural style: Multiple styles
- NRHP reference No.: 82004071 (original); 100005139 (increase)

Significant dates
- Added to NRHP: April 15, 1982
- Boundary increase: March 27, 2020

Hincheyville Historic District is a 53-acre (21 ha) historic district in Franklin, Tennessee. It is one of seven local historic districts in Franklin and was listed on the National Register of Historic Places in 1982, with boundary revisions in 2020.

Hincheyville was Franklin's first residential addition, subdivided in 1819. It was located outside the original town boundaries and was subdivided for development by Hinchey Petway, a wealthy merchant for whom the area is named. Its streets are wide and lined with trees.

A few substantial homes were built in Hincheyville before the Civil War, but significant residential development did not occur until the latter decades of the 19th century. The oldest building in the area dates from circa 1828 and most were built in the late 19th and early 20th centuries. The Colonial Revival, Bungalow and English Tudor architectural styles were popular in the 1920s and 1930s.

When listed, the National Register historic district included 70 contributing buildings, 20 non-contributing buildings, and one non-contributing site. Most are single-family residences. The antebellum St. Paul's Episcopal Church is located in the district and is separately listed on the National Register; in 1988 a National Register nomination document described it as "one of the finest remaining" Gothic Revival style churches in middle Tennessee.

The Hincheyville historic district is one of five National Register historic districts in the city of Franklin. Four of these, including Hincheyville, are also designated as local historic districts by city ordinance, making them subject to design review. Franklin has seven local historic districts.
