= Jabez Leftwich =

American politician

Member of the Alabama House of Representatives from Madison County
- In office August 1, 1836 – August 7, 1837

Member of the U.S. House of Representatives from Virginia
- In office March 4, 1821 – March 4, 1825
- Preceded by: William A. Burwell (14th); William Smith (7th)
- Succeeded by: Nathaniel Claiborne (14th); Charles F. Mercer (7th)
- Constituency: 14th district (1821-23); 7th district (1823-25)

Member of the Virginia House of Delegates from Bedford County
- In office December 7, 1801–December 3, 1809 Serving with Isaac Otey, Samuel Hancock
- Preceded by: Samuel Hancock
- Succeeded by: William Hopkins

Personal details
- Born: September 22, 1765 Bedford County, Virginia
- Died: June 22, 1855 (aged 89) Huntsville, Alabama
- Resting place: Maple Hill Cemetery, Huntsville, Alabama
- Party: Jacksonian
- Other political affiliations: Democratic-Republican
- Relations: Joel Leftwich (brother)

Military service
- Branch/service: Virginia militia
- Rank: Colonel
- Battles/wars: War of 1812

Jabez Leftwich (September 22, 1765 – June 22, 1855) was an American politician, planter and military officer who represented Virginia's 14th congressional district in the U.S. House of Representatives between 1821 and 1825, as well as served in the Virginia House of Delegates representing Bedford County, and finally represented Madison County, Alabama in the Alabama House of Representatives after moving to that new state.

== Early and family life ==
Leftwich was born in Bedford County, Virginia near Liberty (now Bedford) on September 22, 1765. His father Augustine Leftwich (1712-1795) had moved westward from New Kent County in Virginia's Tidewater region into the Piedmont after securing a royal land grant, and married at least twice. Jabez was the youngest of his surviving sons, most of whom distinguished themselves in the American Revolutionary War. His elder brothers included Ltc. William Leftwich (1737-1820), Col. Thomas Leftwich (1740-1816), Augustine Leftwich Jr. (1744-1835), Capt. Uriah Leftwich (1748-1838), Col. Littleberry Leftwich (1757-1823) and Joel Leftwich (1759-1846, who became this man's commanding officer in the War of 1812, and whose political career this man would supersede). The family also included two daughters who married: Ann Petross Leftwich Hackworth (1731-1820) married a veteran of the French and Indian War, and Mary Elizabeth Leftwich Early (1746-1818) married Joshua Early and had a son Rev. John Early who became a Methodist preacher and for 19 years of bishop of the Methodist Episcopal Church South.

In 1785, Jabez Leftwich married Delilah Stovall (1766-1846), who bore sons Augustine Leftwich (1785-1844) and Capt. Jabez Leftwich Jr. (1792-1876), as well as daughters Permelia Leftwich Drake (1787-1829), Elizabeth Leftwich Drake (1798-1876) and Eliza Leftwich Drake (1808-1850), all of whom married different members of the same family.

== Career ==
Bedford County voters elected Leftwich to represent them several times, beginning in 1801 when he became one of Bedford County's representatives (part-time) in the Virginia House of Delegates, and won re-election annually until 1809. Except for the term that began December 3, 1805, he served alongside Isaac Otey, then served with Samuel Hancock, who had succeeded his brother and whom he had defeated in 1809.

During the War of 1812, Leftwich served as inspector general in the Virginia state militia, with the rank of colonel on the staff of his brother, Brigadier General Joel Leftwich.

Leftwich was elected in 1820 as a Democratic-Republican representative to the 17th United States Congress and was reelected in 1822 as a Crawford Democratic-Republican representative to the 18th United States Congress. He was an unsuccessful candidate for reelection in 1824.

Within two years after his congressional term expired in 1825, Leftwich moved to Madison County, Alabama, where he was a farmer and merchant. In his later years, he served in the Alabama House of Representatives.

Leftwich farmed using slave labor, as did his father and brothers. In the 1810 census, he owned 14 slaves. A decade later, he owned six slaves in Bedford county's southern district, and ten in the northern district. Shortly before his wife's death in 1846 after a protracted illness of several months, they moved to Franklin County, Alabama in the Russell Valley and lived in the household of their daughter Betsey, who had married William Drake. Her sister Eliza had married Capt. Neely Drake and moved to Pickens County, Alabama. Their sister Permelia had married Andrew Drake but predeceased her mother, dying in childbirth in 1829.

== Death and legacy ==
Leftwich also died in the household of his daughter and her husband near Huntsville, Alabama on June 22, 1855. He was buried in Maple Hill Cemetery in Huntsville.

The University of Virginia has some of the Leftwich family papers. His namesake grandson Col. Jabez Leftwich Drake (1832=1864) died in the Battle of Peachtree Creek near Atlanta. Another grandson, Cpt. Joel W. Leftwich (1842-1862)died of pneumonia at Chimbarozo hospital during that conflict.

== Electoral history ==
- 1823; Leftwich was elected to the U.S. House of Representatives with 56.12% of the vote, defeating fellow Democratic-Republican Nathaniel H. Claiborne.

U.S. House of Representatives
Preceded by William A. Burwell	Member of the U.S. House of Representatives from Virginia's 14th congressional district 1821–1823	Succeeded by Charles F. Mercer
Preceded by William Smith	Member of the U.S. House of Representatives from Virginia's 7th congressional district 1823–1825	Succeeded by Nathaniel Claiborne
