= Thomas Claiborne (Virginia politician) =

American politician

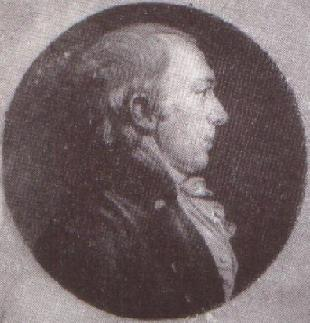
- A portrait of Thomas Claiborne by Saint-Mémin

Member of the U.S. House of Representatives from Virginia's 17th district
- In office March 4, 1803 – March 3, 1805
- Preceded by: Richard Brent
- Succeeded by: John Claiborne

Member of the U.S. House of Representatives from Virginia's 8th district
- In office March 4, 1801 – March 3, 1803
- Preceded by: Samuel Goode
- Succeeded by: Walter Jones
- In office March 4, 1793 – March 3, 1799
- Preceded by: Josiah Parker
- Succeeded by: Samuel Goode

Member of the Virginia Senate from Brunswick, Lunenberg, Mecklenburg and Greensville Counties
- In office 1790–1792
- Preceded by: John Jones
- Succeeded by: Jesse Browne

Member of the Virginia House of Delegates from Brunswick County
- In office 1784–1787; Alongside Thomas Edmunds, Binns Jones and Andrew Meade

Personal details
- Born: February 1, 1749 Brunswick County, Virginia Colony, British America
- Died: 1812 (aged 62–63) Brunswick County, Virginia, U.S.
- Party: Democratic-Republican
- Other political affiliations: Anti-Administration

Military service
- Allegiance: United States
- Branch/service: Virginia Militia
- Years of service: 1789
- Rank: Colonel

Thomas Burnell Claiborne (February 1, 1749 – 1812) was a planter and politician from Brunswick County, Virginia, who served in both houses of the Virginia General Assembly as well as in the United States House of Representatives (from 1793 to 1799 and from 1801 to 1805), and fathered two sons who also became Congressman.

== Early life and education ==
Claiborne was born in 1747 at "Fox Castle" plantation in Dinwiddie County in the Colony of Virginia, the son of tavernkeeper Burnell Claiborne (1721–1787) and his wife, the former Hannah Ravenscorft Poythress, whose first husband Francis Poythress had died. He had an elder sister Martha (1744–1825) who married Rev. Devereux Jarrett (who became a major missionary in Southside Virginia), and another sister named Sallie. His grandfather had been Leonard Claiborne, whose brothers became clerks of Stafford County, Northumberland County and Surry Counties. His uncle, another Leonard Claiborne, had married another Poythress sister and represented Dinwiddie County in the House of Burgesses before moving to Georgia, and another uncle, Richard Claiborne (d. 1776) represented Lunenberg County in the House of Burgesses and revolutionary conventions. Complicating matters, another Thomas Claiborne was a grandson of grandfather Leonard's brother Augustine Claiborne, who married Mary Herbert and had at least six sons and three daughters who reached adulthood after he moved southward from King William County to a plantation he named Windsor, which was initially in then-vast Surry County (of which he served as burgess then county clerk) but which in 1754 became Sussex County (of which he served as clerk for more than two decades and then was elected a state senator in 1779 but declared ineligible because of his position as County Clerk). That cousin Thomas Claiborne established a plantation in New Kent County. This Thomas the fifth generation of his family in America, descended from merchant William Claiborne who had settled in Virginia in 1621 and became the colony's secretary of state, and William's son, Lieutenant Colonel Thomas Claiborne who was killed by an arrow in 1683, but not before fathering this man's great-grandfather Thomas. Claiborne family members had previously operated plantations and stores in Tidewater Virginia and Maryland. Augustine Claiborne's brother Leonard represented King William County in the House of Burgesses, as did his cousin Phillip Whitehead Claiborne.

This man married twice. He married Mary Clayton in 1772, then married Ann Driver, who survived him and died about 1819, having given birth to a daughter, Sallie. The father of John Claiborne and Thomas Claiborne (1780–1856), uncle of Nathaniel Herbert Claiborne and William Charles Cole Claiborne, granduncle of John Francis Hamtramck Claiborne, and great-great-great-great-granduncle of Corinne Claiborne Boggs. He received a private education appropriate to this class, but it is unclear whether he attended the College of WIlliam and Mary, as did many members of the family after Sarah, the widow of the first William Claiborne established a scholarship there.

== Military officer ==
In an era when all white males were required to serve in the local militia, Claiborne was an officer, and by 1789 rose to the rank of colonel and commanded the Brunswick County Militia. He was also responsible for collecting military supplies for patriot forces in the Revolutionary War.

== Planter ==
Like many of his ancestors, Claiborne was a merchant and also operated plantations using enslaved labor. In the 1789 Virginia tax census, he had a license to operate an ordinary (tavern) in Brunswick County, and owned 19 adult slaves as well as 17 enslaved children, 13 horses and 27 cattle. In the 1810 federal census, two men with the same name (but probably relatives, owned slaves, one in Petersburg (by then in Dinwiddie County) and the other in New Kent County.

Brunswick County voters elected and re-elected Claiborne to represent them in the Virginia House of Delegates (1783–1788). He resigned that position in order to become Brunswick County's sheriff (1789–1792). Beginning in 1790, he served (part-time) in the state senate (1790–1792).

He was elected to the Third Congress and reelected as a Democratic-Republican to the Fourth and Fifth Congresses. He was defeated for reelection in 1798 by Samuel Goode, but he was again elected as a Democratic Republican to the Seventh and Eighth Congresses.

== Death and legacy ==
He died on his estate in Brunswick County in 1812.

He was the father of United States Congressman Thomas Claiborne (1780–1856).

U.S. House of Representatives
| Preceded by Josiah Parker | Member of the U.S. House of Representatives from Virginia's 8th congressional district 1793–1799 | Succeeded by Samuel Goode |
| Preceded by Samuel Goode | Member of the U.S. House of Representatives from Virginia's 8th congressional district 1801–1803 | Succeeded by Walter Jones |
| Preceded by Richard Brent | Member of the U.S. House of Representatives from Virginia's 17th congressional district 1803–1805 | Succeeded by John Claiborne |
