= Nathaniel Claiborne =

American politician (1777–1859)

Member of the U.S. House of Representatives from Virginia's 7th district
- In office March 4, 1825 – March 3, 1837
- Preceded by: Jabez Leftwich
- Succeeded by: Archibald Stuart

Chair of the Committee on Elections
- In office March 4, 1831 – March 3, 1837
- Preceded by: Willis Alston
- Succeeded by: Andrew Buchanan

Member of the Virginia Senate from Franklin, Patrick, Henry and Pittsylvania Counties
- In office December 3, 1821–December 2, 1825
- Preceded by: George Hairston, Jr.
- Succeeded by: Joseph Martin, Jr.

Member of the Virginia House of Delegates from Franklin County
- In office December 3, 1810 – 1811 Serving with Fleming Saunders, Silas Garrett
- Preceded by: Robert Innes
- Succeeded by: Robert Innes

Personal details
- Born: Nathaniel Herbert Claiborne; November 14, 1777 Chesterfield, Virginia
- Died: August 15, 1859 (aged 81) Rocky Mount, Virginia
- Party: Anti-Jacksonian (after 1835)
- Other political affiliations: Jacksonian (before 1835)
- Occupation: planter

Nathaniel Herbert Claiborne (November 14, 1777 – August 15, 1859) was a nineteenth-century Virginia lawyer and planter, as well as an American politician who served in both houses of the Virginia General Assembly and in the United States House of Representatives (1825-1837).

== Early and family life ==
Born in Chesterfield, Virginia to Mary Leigh Claiborne (1750-1782) and her first cousin and husband, William Claiborne (1748-1809), Claiborne was born to the First Families of Virginia. He could trace his ancestry to William Claiborne (1600–1677), a merchant who emigrated to the Virginia Colony from Kent, England, and became active politically and militarily in the Chesapeake Bay region. His elder brother William Charles Cole Claiborne would also become politically active, including as Governor of Louisiana, Tennessee congressman and U.S. Senator. Their uncle Thomas Claiborne, served five terms in the U.S. House of Representatives. His father had been born at the Sweet Hall plantation in King William County, but was young when his father died and was raised by his burgess uncle Augustine Claiborne at the Windsor plantation in Sussex County. On coming of age, William inherited the Putney plantation in New Kent County, but advertised it for sale in 1780 and was living in Hanover County in 1783. He also owned 1002 acres of land in King William County in 1782, but sold it later that year. Financial reverses as a result of the American Revolutionary War, led William to move his family to Manchester, Virginia (now a district of Richmond, Virginia) by 1782, where he became a merchant. In April 1782, his wife (this boy's mother) died, and William Claiborne remarried the following year to the widow Frances Blair Black, who did not bear children in this marriage but would survive her husband and died aged 78 in 1822. The family included elder brothers Ferdinand Leigh Claiborne who married Mary Magdalene Hutchins, William C.C. Claiborne who had a distinguished political career, this Nathaniel Herbert Claiborne, and younger brothers Thomas Augustine Claiborne (who married twice) and Charles Augustine Claiborne (who was borne in 1777), and a daughter Mary Leigh Claiborne (who married her cousin Bathhurst Claiborne). Like his brothers, Nathaniel received a private classical education at a local academy appropriate to his class, and also read law.

== Career ==
By 1798, Claiborne had been admitted to the Virginia bar and was practicing in Lee County, on the new state's western frontier. In 1801 Claiborne moved to Franklin County and soon won election as the Commonwealth's attorney (prosecutor), and would win re-election several times before resigning in 1810 to become a part-time member of the Virginia House of Delegates, as described below, as well as maintain his own private legal practice. Claiborne also won election as captain of the local militia in November 1803.

Between 1802 and 1806, Claiborne purchased about 800 acres of land in Franklin County north of the Blackwater River, and established a plantation he called "Claybrook". That became his principal residence for the rest of his life. Claiborne farmed using enslaved labor. He owned 19 slaves in 1810, 14 slaves in 1820 (of whom 4 boys and 3 girls were 14 years old or younger), 17 slaves in 1830 (of whom 3 boys and a girl were 10 years old or younger), 14 slaves in 1840, of whom a boy and 2 girls were 10 years old or younger.

=== Virginia delegate ===
Franklin County voters in 1809 first elected Claiborne as one of their representatives in the Virginia House of Delegates, and he won re-election until 1812. During his first legislative terms, he sat on the Committee for Courts of Justice and objected to salaries earned by members of the Court of Appeal as well as to the time required to adjudicate cases. Claiborne instead favored instead county-level courts. He also voted to instruct Virginia's congressional delegation to oppose re-chartering of the Bank of the United States, foreshadowing his future allegiance with Jacksonian Democrats, but also voted in favor of establishing a new bank in Lynchburg, which was becoming a commercial hub. During the War of 1812, fellow legislators elected Claiborne to Virginia's Council of State, which assisted the Commonwealth's Governor in running the state, and which precluded simultaneous legislative service. He attended sessions regularly until his marriage in May 1815 (and the war's slowing down), and resigned that position on April 1, 1817. Claiborne also wrote several articles about the conflict, which he consolidated in 1819 and republished as Notes on the War in the South; with Biographical Sketches of the Lives of Montgomery, Jackson, Sevier, the Late Gov. Claiborne, and Others.

In 1818, Virginia's governor appointed Claiborne to the commission which met at Rockfish Gap and chose to locate the new University of Virginia in Albemarle County. However, Claiborne declined an offered professorship at the institution.

=== Congress ===
In 1821, voters from Franklin County, as well as adjoining Henry, Patrick and Pittsylvania Counties elected Claiborne as their representative in the Virginia State Senate. He completed one term, from 1821 to 1825, in part because he lost his first contest to become a U.S. Congressman (running as a Jacksonian democrat), to Jabez Leftwich.

However, two years later, Claiborne ran as an Anti-Jacksonian and defeated Leftwich. He won re-election to the United States House of Representatives several times, serving from 1825 to 1837. Congressman Claiborne rose to become chairman of the Committee on Elections from 1831 to 1837. After losing his re-election attempt in 1836 to Archibald Stuart, Claiborne returned to his Rocky Mount plantation.

== Personal life ==
In 1815, Claiborne married Elizabeth Archer Binford (1799-1880) of Goochland County, who would survive him by many years. They would have six daughters and five sons, of whom the second son, Nathaniel C. Claiborne would continue the family's (and his father's) political involvement, first in Virginia and later in Missouri. His elder brother, Ferdiannd Leigh Claiborne (1817-1862), was born in Richmond, became a tobacco merchant and married into the Taliaferro family, and died in Baltimore during the Civil War. William Patrick Claiborne (1827-1891) would serve in the Confederate Army. Thomas Binford Claiborne (1832-?) became judge of the Franklin County court in 1874. The youngest son, James Robert Claiborne married Frances Moore. Their sisters Susan Magdalene Claiborne and Mary Elizabeth Claiborne married George W. Wilson and Thomas Wilson, and Bettie Herbert Claiborne married James Otey. Ann Claiborne married James B. Wilson a,d Catherine Sophronia Claiborne married twice, to David Franklin Frederick and Thomas Bailey Greer More distant relatives of later generations who became politically noteworthy include: John Francis Hamtramck Claiborne (nephew) and the great-great-great grand-niece and nephew of Marie Corinne Morrison Claiborne Boggs and Claiborne de Borda Pell.

== Death and legacy ==
Claiborne died on August 15, 1859, near Rocky Mount, Virginia. He was interred in the family cemetery at his "Claybrook" estate.

== Elections ==
- 1825; Claiborne was elected to the U.S. House of Representatives unopposed.
- 1827; Claiborne was re-elected with 67.71% of the vote, defeating Independent William Campbell.
- 1829; Claiborne was re-elected unopposed.
- 1831; Claiborne was re-elected unopposed.
- 1833; Claiborne was re-elected unopposed.
- 1835; Claiborne was re-elected with 51.31% of the vote, defeating Democrat Alexander H.H. Stuart.
- 1837; Claiborne lost his re-election bid.

U.S. House of Representatives
Preceded by Jabez Leftwich	Member of the U.S. House of Representatives from Virginia's 7th congressional district March 4, 1825 – March 3, 1837	Succeeded by Archibald Stuart
