= Thomas Claiborne (politician, born 1780) =

American politician

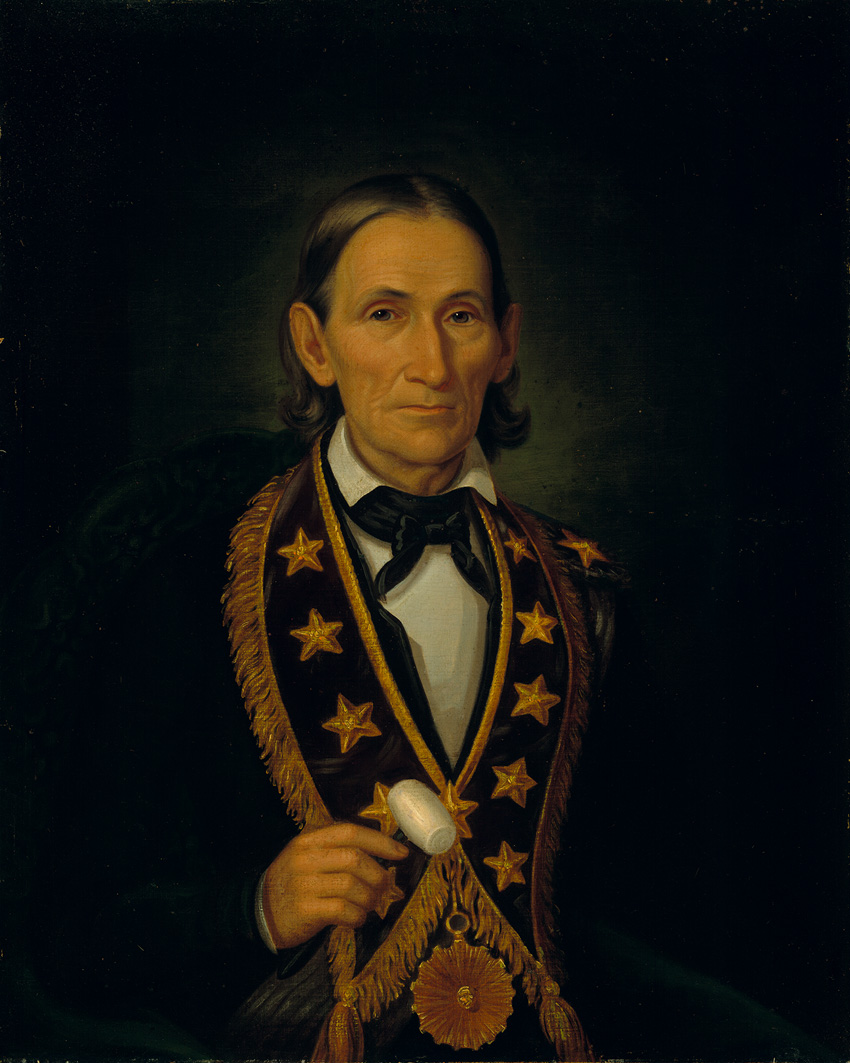
- Claiborne in Masonic regalia, ca. 1813

Member of the United States House of Representatives from Tennessee's 5th district
- In office March 4, 1817 – March 3, 1819
- Preceded by: Newton Cannon
- Succeeded by: Newton Cannon

Member of the Tennessee House of Representatives
- In office 1811-1812

Personal details
- Born: May 17, 1780 Brunswick County, Virginia
- Died: January 7, 1856 (aged 75) Nashville, Tennessee
- Party: Democratic-Republican

Thomas Claiborne (May 17, 1780 – January 7, 1856) was an American Democratic-Republican politician and son of Virginia Congressman Thomas B. Claiborne, who continued the family's political and planter traditions and served in the United States House of Representatives for the state of Tennessee.

== Early life and family background ==
Son of Mary & Thomas B. Claiborne was born in Brunswick County, Virginia. The Claiborne family was one of the First Families of Virginia since the 17th century, when members sat on the Virginia governor's council and traded with native Americans and others in England, Maryland and Virginia. An earlier Thomas Claiborne sat in the House of Burgesses representing King William County (and he or his son established the historic house at Sweet Hall). This boy's father, who also served as a Virginia legislator and U.S. Congressman, was the fifth generation to hold such political and economic power. This boy received an education appropriate to his class, although it remains unclear whether he attended the College of William and Mary, as had other members of the family.

== Military officer ==
While his father served in the Revolutionary War, this Thomas Claiborne served on the staff of Gen. Andrew Jackson in the Creek War, with the rank of Major.

== Planter and lawyer ==
Claiborne read law and was admitted to the bar and commenced practice in Nashville, Tennessee, in 1807. In the 1820 federal census, he owned 21 slaves, but a decade later, he owned eight slaves. Two decades later, he owned ten slaves, including two 44 year old women, a 30-year old woman, a three year old girl and two 2-year old boys.

== Politician ==
As a member of Tennessee House of Representatives from 1811 to 1812, fellow delegates elected him as their Speaker, so he presided over the latter sessions. Claiborne also served as a United States Marshal. Elected as a Democratic-Republican to the Fifteenth Congress, Claiborne served from March 4, 1817 to March 3, 1819. He also served as Mayor of Nashville in 1818.

== Death ==
Claiborne died on January 7, 1856, at the age of 75 years, 235 days. He is interred at Nashville City Cemetery, Nashville, Tennessee.

== Personal life ==
Claiborne represented Hiram Lodge No. 7 and Cumberland Lodge No. 8, of the Free and Accepted Masons, at the formation of the Grand Lodge of Tennessee on December 27, 1813. He was chosen Most Worshipful Grand Master of Tennessee from 1813 to 1814. He resumed the practice of law in Nashville.

Masonic offices
New office	Grand Master of the Grand Lodge of Tennessee; 1813–1814	Succeeded by Robert Searcy
U.S. House of Representatives
Preceded by Newton Cannon	Member of the U.S. House of Representatives from Tennessee's 3rd congressional district 1817–1819	Succeeded by Newton Cannon
