= Honfleur (disambiguation) =

Honfleur may refer to:-

- Honfleur, a town in Calvados, France
- Honfleur, Quebec, a village in Canada
- Honfleur Gallery, an art gallery
- SS Honfleur (1873), a steamship in service 1873-1911
- MV Honfleur, a passenger ferry planned to enter service in 2021
