= History of Native Americans in Washington, D.C. =

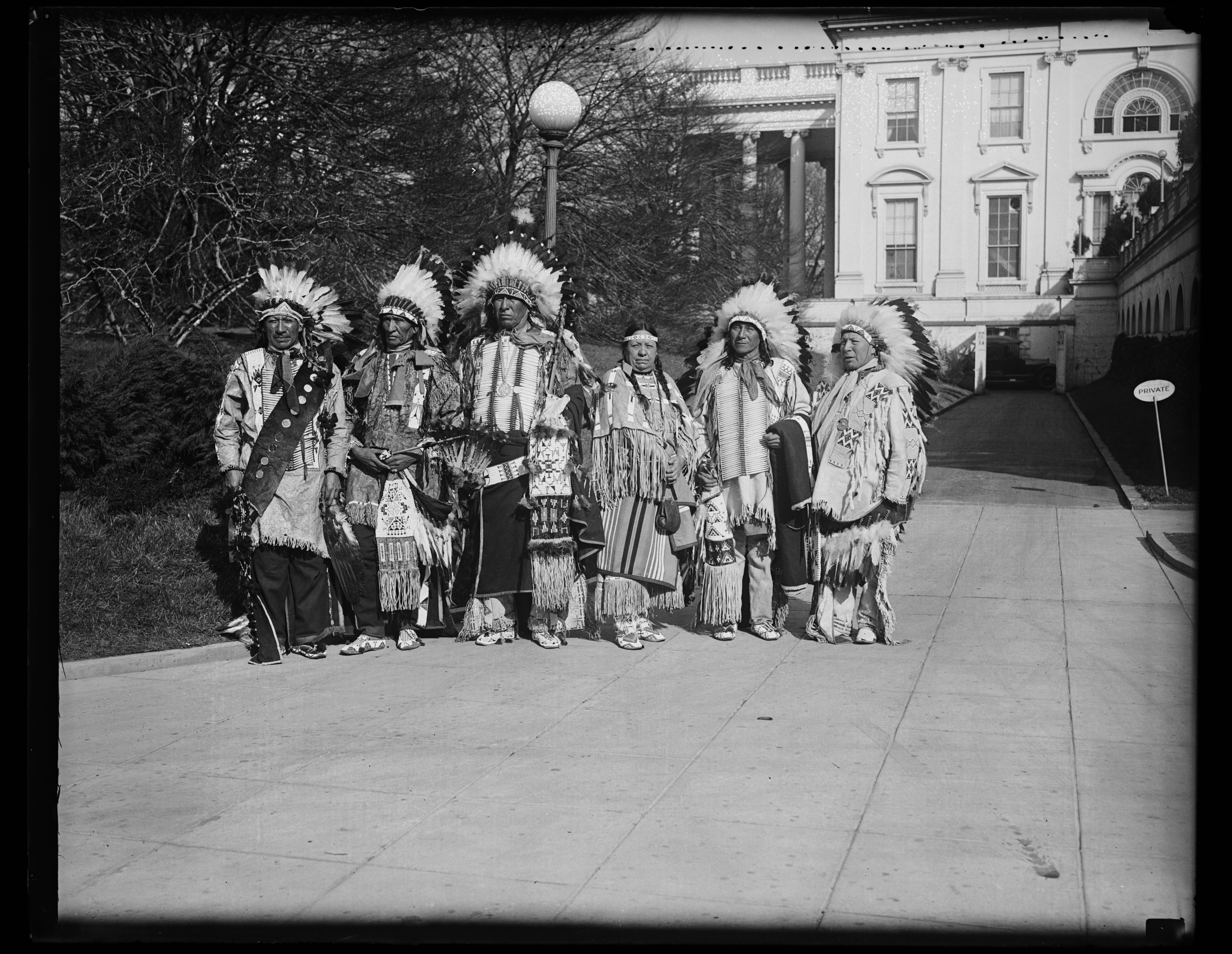
1929 photo of Native Americans at the White House, Washington, D.C.

The local history of Native Americans in Washington, D.C., dates back at least 4,000 years.

Washington, D.C. is a central location for regulatory agencies, and advocacy organizations. Consequently, in recent history it has also become a central location for political protests related to Native Americans in the United States.

== Demographics ==
According to 2019 US Census Bureau estimates, D.C.'s population was 0.3% Native American and Alaskan Native. Today, approximately 4,000 Indigenous people live in Washington, D.C.

== Early history ==
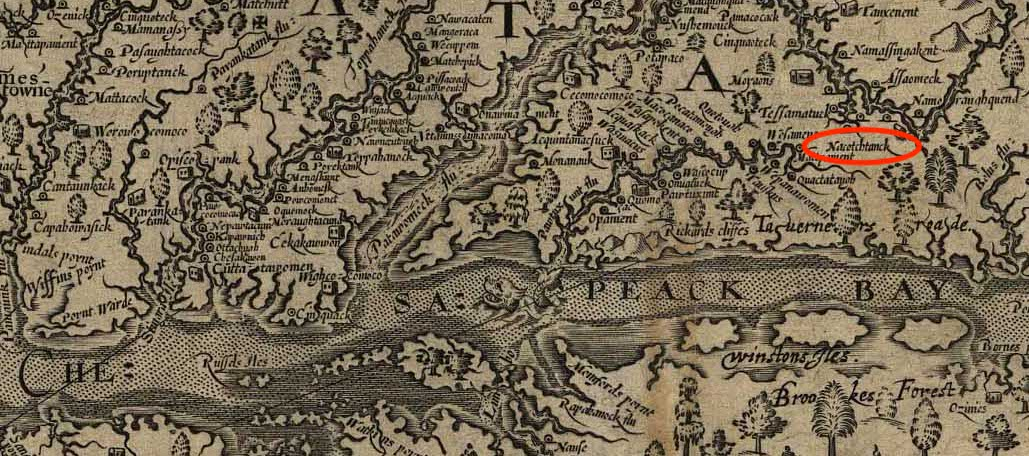
John Smith's 1624 map with a red circle to indicate the location of the Nacotchtank tribe, as indicated by Smith.

Archaeological evidence indicates that American Indians settled in the Washington, D.C., area at least 4,000 years ago, close to the Anacostia River. Native inhabitants within the present-day District of Columbia included the Nacotchtank, at Anacostia, who were affiliated with the Conoy.

Another village was located between Little Falls and Georgetown, and there was a Nacotchtank village called Tohoga on the site of present-day Georgetown.

The Nacotchtank were a trading people as they were established on fertile land with nearby rivers. During his 1608 expedition, English explorer John Smith noted the prosperous Nacotchtank and their great supply of various resources. The Nacotchtank were closely associated with the larger Piscataway Chiefdom of Maryland, whose Tayac (grand chief) ruled over a confederacy of area tribes.

In 1650s, the Province of Maryland began to experience an economic boom with the great popularity and demand of one of its cash crops, tobacco. This expansion necessitated vast areas of land being turned into tobacco plantations as the demand was exceedingly high.

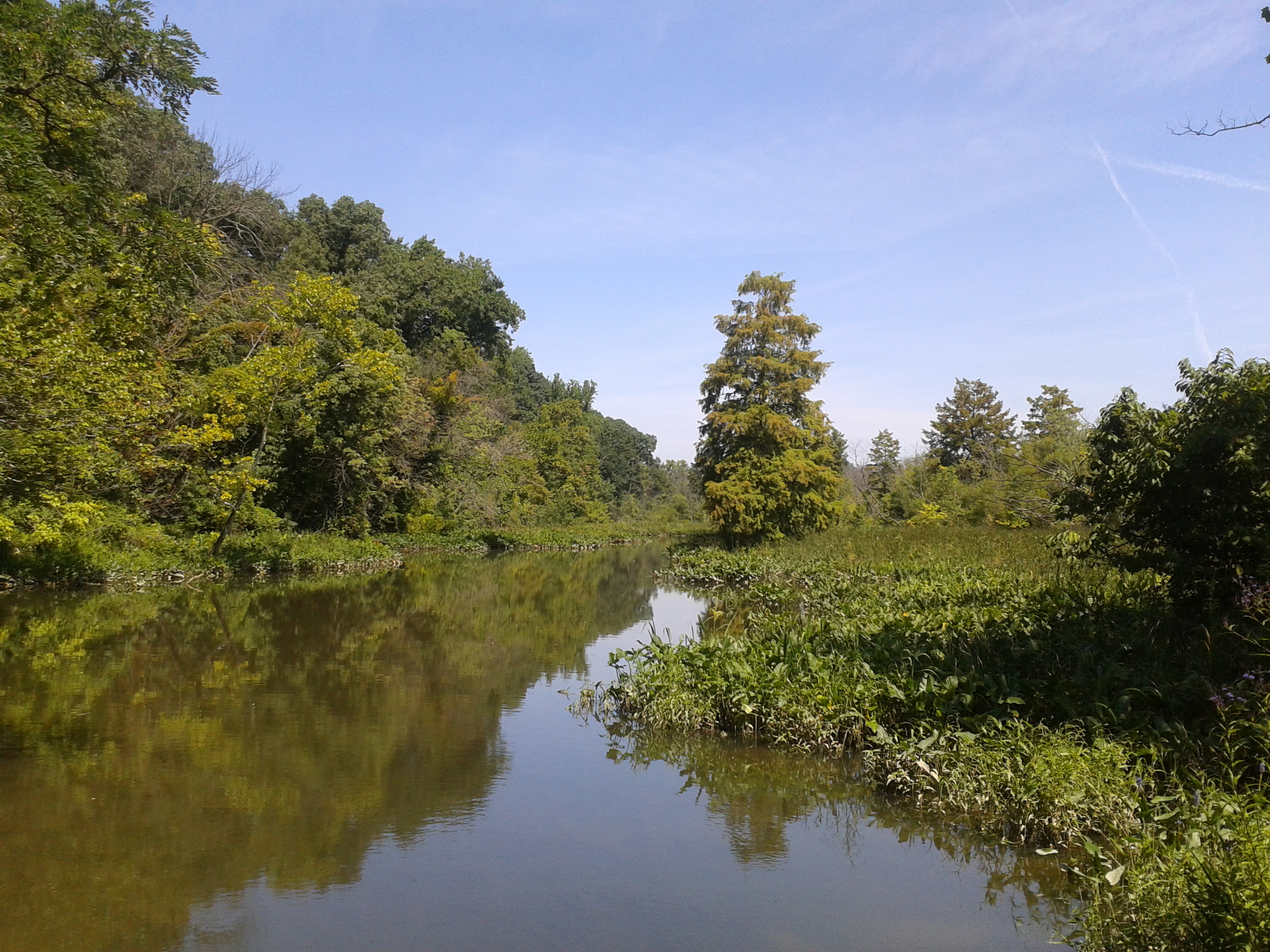
Anacostine Island, which has since been renamed to "Theodore Roosevelt Island"

In 1663, Cecil Calvert, the second Lord of Baltimore, granted Thomas Dent an 850-acre tract of land named Gisborough on the Potomac River, which bordered the principal Nacotchtank village. The colony, in such close proximity to the Nacotchtank, now had the leverage to begin encroaching on Nacotchtank territory. Additionally, with the two groups now close to one another and in constant contact, the Europeans from Maryland introduced to the area a number of Eurasian infectious diseases to which the Nacotchtank had no immunity, including measles, cholera, and smallpox. As a result, the Nacotchtank suffered a large population loss.

In 1668, the Nacotchtank tribe, depopulated from Eurasian diseases, collectively relocated to Anacostine Island, which has since been renamed to "Theodore Roosevelt Island." By this period, the population of local American Indians was only one-quarter of those that lived in the region prior to 1608.

By the late 1690s, the population of Native Americans in the region had significantly reduced.

== Modern history ==
Today, approximately 4,000 Indigenous people live in Washington, D.C. In recent years there have been efforts to bolster awareness, understanding, and education around the local history of Indigenous peoples. The DC Native History Project was established to work with local tribe members to gain further understanding and recognition of the Anacostan heritage of the region, and to create an interactive map of Washington, D.C., with identified original village sites and the locations of artifact excavations.

In an effort to teach locals about their history and culture related to Indigenous people, communities like the Rappahannock tribe host annual celebrations in the national parks. There are also a variety of cultural educational programs offered in the D.C. area regarding Indigenous history. The DC Public Library curates a special collection pertaining to D.C.'s local tribal history and heritage.

In 2019, the Council of the District of Columbia voted to replace Columbus Day with Indigenous Peoples' Day.

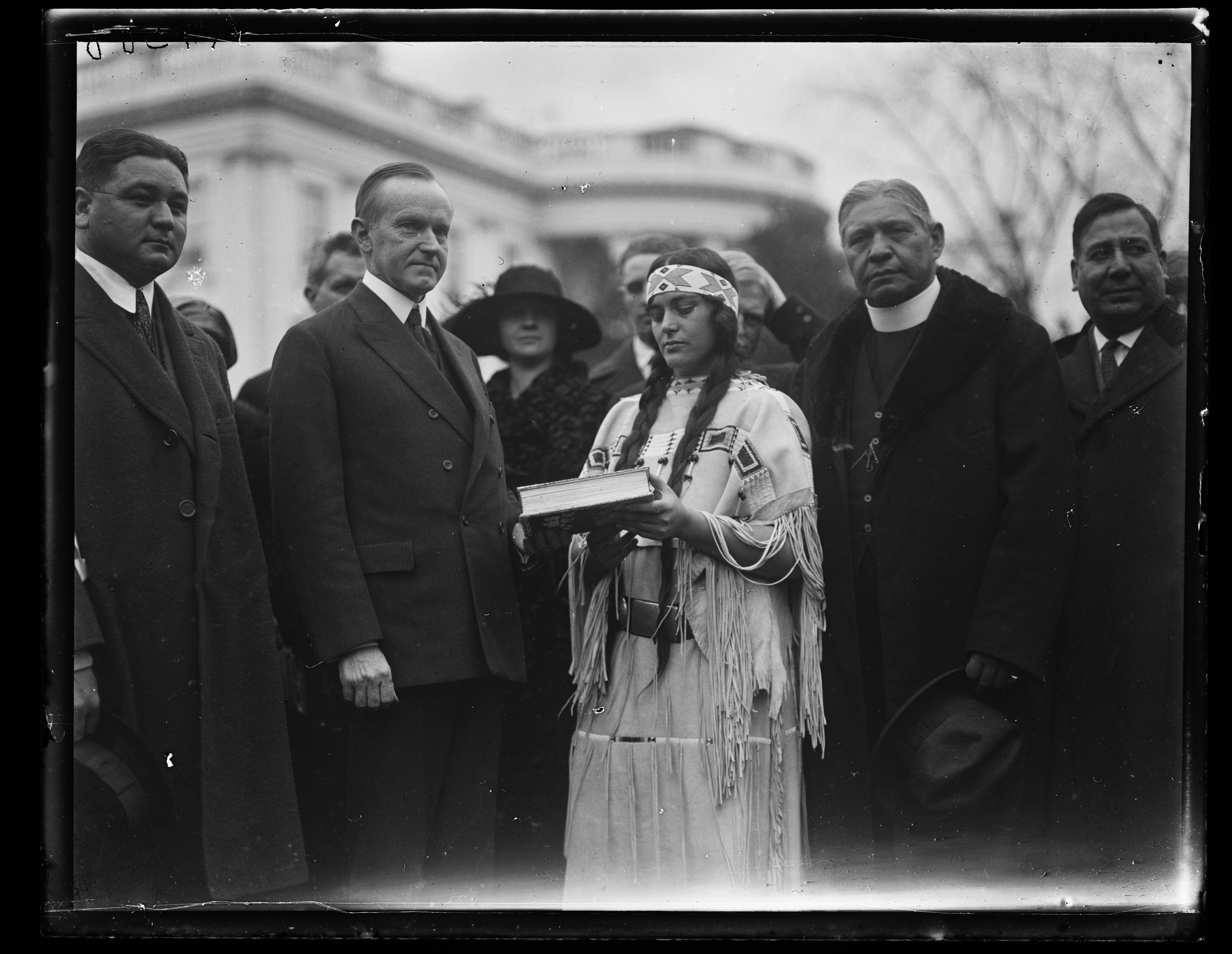
1923 photo of Calvin Coolidge with a Native American group at the White House

Several Washington, D.C., institutions include a land acknowledgement which states that they are located on the ancestral lands of the Nacotchtank (Anacostans) which is also close to the ancestral lands of the neighboring Piscataway and Pamunkey peoples.

At a national scale, Washington, D.C., has become a central location for regulatory authorities, advocacy and interest groups, and political protests related to Native Americans in the United States.

Since the early 1800s, Washington, D.C., has served as a significant focal point for Indigenous peoples seeking to petition the government and enact legislative change at the federal level. D.C. has also hosted tribal nation leader delegations to the U.S. Congress and the White House. In recent years, the White House has also regularly hosted a White House Tribal Nations Summit and a Tribal Youth Summit.

=== Excavations in Washington, D.C. ===
Various excavations have been performed throughout Washington D.C., and identified specific sites in the area once inhabited by the Nacotchtank people.

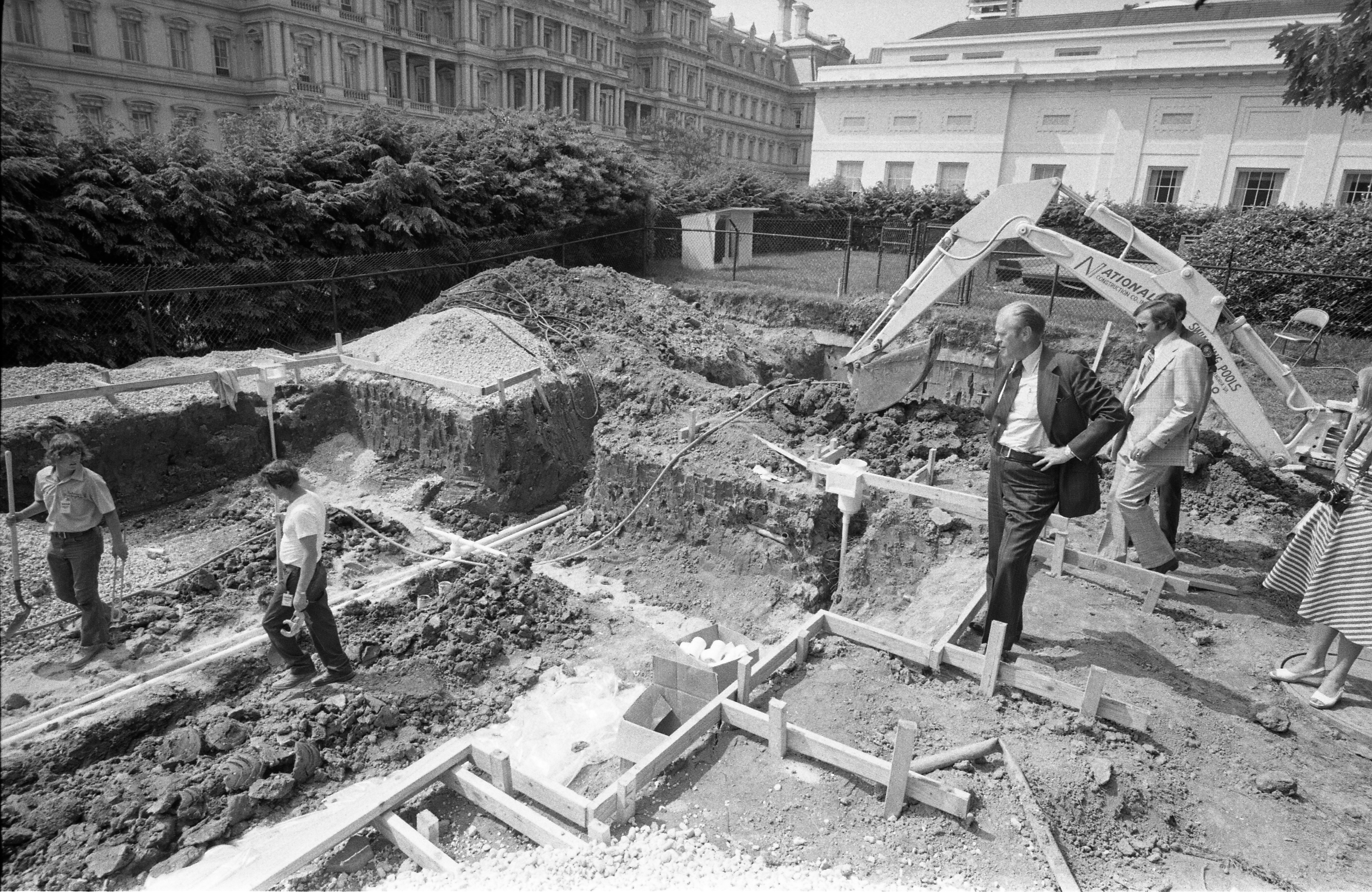
President Gerald Ford surveying the construction site of the new White House Swimming Pool, c. 1975

Although the proximity of rivers was integral for the Nacotchtank, there is evidence of the Nacotchtank existence further inland. During the 1975 construction of the White House swimming pool, analysis of the terrain that was dug up proved Indigenous existence on the site, with findings such as quartzite points, a broken biface (hand axe), and fragments of broken pottery.

In 1997, an excavation near the Whitehurst Freeway, which runs parallel to the Potomac River in Georgetown, gathered findings of a "hair comb, hammer stone, and pendants." This land, upon which modern-day Georgetown is established, has been identified as the site for the Tohoga village. Tohoga was a trading village, with it being located along the river bank of the Potomac and thus permitting easy access for traders.

The Nacotchtank had another village north of Garfield Park on what is now Capitol Hill. The tribe used this land, which now houses the Supreme Court and Library of Congress, for agriculture, growing corn, beans, and squash. The Nacotchtank settled on this specific area as it was flat and much more suitable for agriculture than the uneven land bordering the rivers on which they were initially established. The smooth terrain allowed the Nacotchtank to grow the large stores of corn that were appealing to European colonists.

=== Native American regulatory agencies based in Washington, D.C. ===
- In 1789, the U.S. Congress placed Native American relations within the newly formed War Department. By 1806 the Congress had created a Superintendent of Indian Trade, or "Office of Indian Trade" within the War Department, who was charged with maintaining the factory trading network of the fur trade. The post was held by Thomas L. McKenney from 1816 until the abolition of the agency in 1822.
- Formed in 1824 and headquartered in the Main Interior Building in Washington, D.C., the Bureau of Indian Affairs (BIA), also known as Indian Affairs (IA), is a United States federal agency within the Department of the Interior. It is responsible for implementing federal laws and policies related to American Indians and Alaska Natives, and administering and managing over 55,700,000 acres (225,000 km^{2}) of land held in trust by the U.S. federal government for Indian Tribes. It renders services to roughly 2 million Indigenous Americans across 574 federally recognized tribes.
- Established in Washington, D.C., in 1869, the Board of Indian Commissioners was a committee that advised the federal government of the United States on Native American policy and inspected supplies delivered to Indian agencies to ensure the fulfillment of government treaty obligations.
- The National Council on Indian Opportunity was an American Indian rights group established by Executive Order 11399 on March 6, 1968, headquartered in Washington, D.C., and amended by an act of United States Congress on November 26, 1969. The group's mission was to encourage and oversee the rise of federal programs to benefit the American Indian population, measure the impact and progress of such programs, and suggest ways to improve programs to meet the demands of the American Indian population. The council was terminated on November 26, 1974, under the provisions of section 2 of the act.
- In 2009, the Embassy of Tribal Nations was opened in Washington, D.C., to raise awareness of sovereign tribal nations, establish a presence of tribal governments near Embassy Row, and providing a meeting and gathering space for those tribal bodies and their partners.

=== Native American advocacy organizations based in Washington, D.C. ===
- Established in 1882 and dissolved in 1994, the Indian Rights Association (IRA) was a social activist group dedicated to the well-being and acculturation of American Indians. The group was highly influential in American Indian policy through the 1930s. The organization maintained an office in Washington, D.C., to act as a legislative lobby and liaison with the Board of Indian Commissioners and the Board of Indian Affairs.
- Established in 1911 and dissolved in 1923, the Society of American Indians (headquartered in D.C.) was the first national American Indian rights organization run by and for American Indians.
- Founded in 1944, the National Congress of American Indians (NCAI) is an American Indian and Alaska Native rights organization headquartered in Washington, D.C. It was founded to represent the tribes and resist federal government pressure for termination of tribal rights and assimilation of their people. These were in contradiction of their treaty rights and status as sovereign entities. The organization continues to be an association of federally recognized and state-recognized Indian tribes.
- In 1997, the Native American Bar Association of D.C. (NABA-DC) was established in 1997 to promote the educational and professional advancement of Native American attorneys and Indian country.
- In September 2001, tribal leaders met of the Native American Rights Fund met in Washington, D.C., and established the Tribal Supreme Court Project in an effort to "strengthen tribal advocacy before the U.S. Supreme Court by developing new litigation strategies and coordinating tribal legal resources."
- In 2011, the D.C.-based Center for Native American Youth was founded by former U.S. Senator Byron Dorgan to "improve the lives of Native American children by focusing on education and health with special emphasis on teen suicide prevention."

=== Native American monuments and museums in Washington, D.C. ===
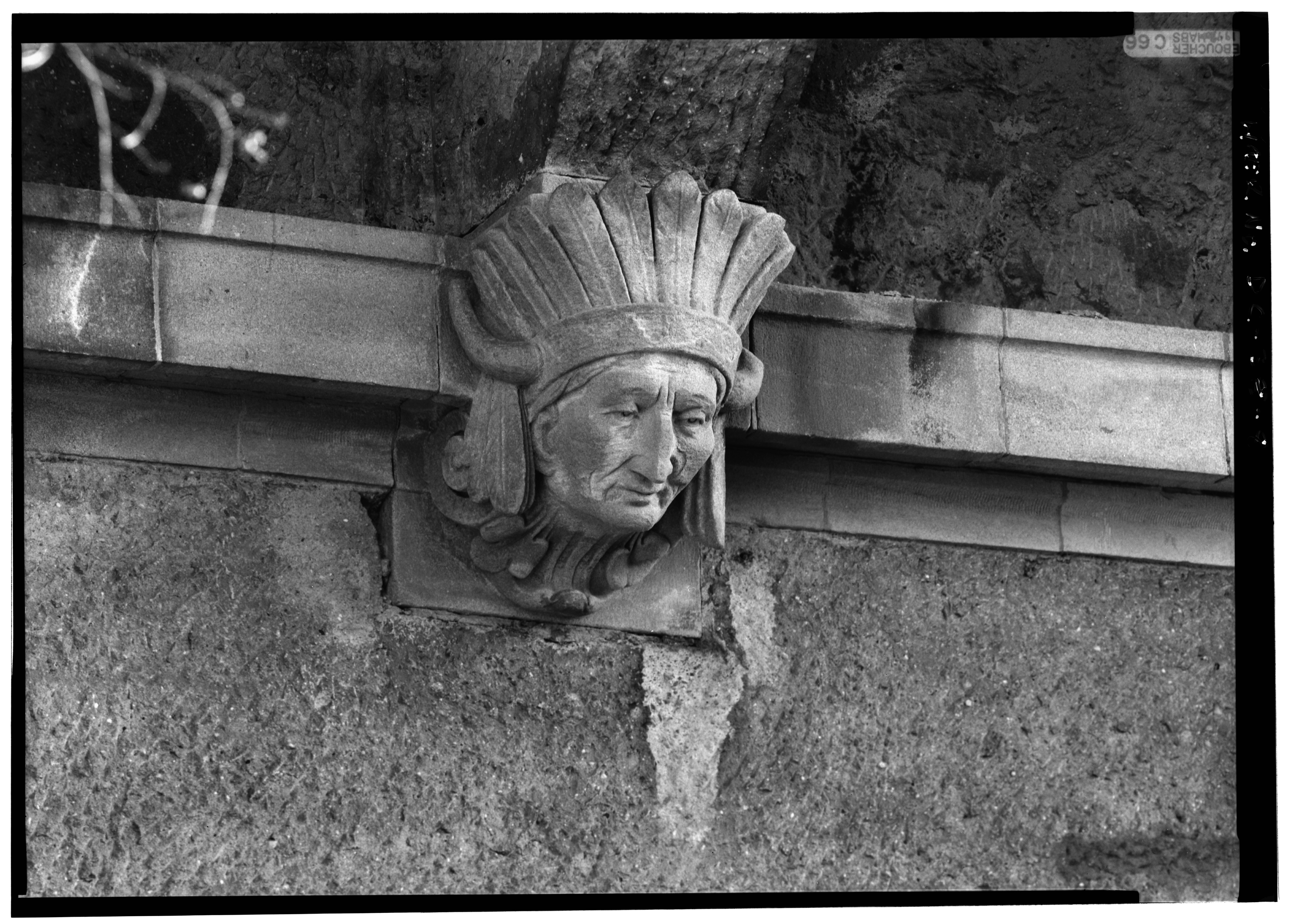
Sculpture of Kicking Bear by Glenn Brown, on Dumbarton Bridge

Though the Nacotchtank were absorbed by the Piscataway and relocated north, some aspects of Washington, D.C., are named after them. The river surrounding the eastern border of the city and the neighborhood in southeast D.C. are named "Anacostia" after the Latinized version of Nacotchtank.

Built in 1910, the architecture of the Dumbarton Bridge pays "homage" to the Indigenous people who once inhabited the Washington, D.C., area. Lining the bridge's sides are 56 busts of Tribal leader Kicking Bear, a long-time advocate for his people who served as a warrior, spiritual leader, and delegate elected by his community to represent tribal interests in D.C. The United States Capitol in Washington, D.C., contains paintings, sculptures, and murals featuring various scenes of Indian history. Among the most notable of these are the statues of Native American historical leaders in the National Statuary Hall Collection. The statues in Emancipation Hall include:

- Vice President Charles Curtis, the first Native American to be elected to the federal executive branch
- Standing Bear, the first Native American judicially granted civil rights under American law
- Sakakawea, the Shoshone leader of the Lewis and Clark expedition
- King Kamehameha I, founder and ruler of the Kingdom of Hawaii
- Chief Washakie, Shoshone statesman, warrior, and negotiator of the Treaty of Fort Laramie of 1851
- Po'pay, leader of the 1680 Pueblo Revolt against Spanish colonial rule
- Sarah Winnemucca, the Paiute spokesperson, author, and interpreter

Established in 2004, the National Museum of the American Indian is a museum in Washington, D.C., devoted to the culture of the Indigenous peoples of the Americas. It is part of the Smithsonian Institution group of museums and research centers.

In 2020, The National Native American Veterans Memorial was opened on the grounds of the National Museum of the American Indian in Washington, D.C. The memorial recognizes the "enduring and distinguished service of Native Americans in every branch of the US military."

== D.C. Native American protests ==
Native American March, June 27, 2003, Washington, D.C

=== 1972 occupation of BIA headquarters ===
On November 3, 1972, a group of around 500 American Indians took over the BIA building, the culmination of their Trail of Broken Treaties walk. They intended to bring attention to American Indian issues, including their demands for renewed negotiation of treaties, enforcement of treaty rights and improvement in living standards. They occupied the Department of Interior headquarters from November 3 to 9, 1972.

=== Longest Walk movement ===
Thousands of Native Americans have taken a 8,200 miles long walk from San Francisco, rallying at the National Mall for religious freedom for traditional American Indians and against laws considered anti-Indian by the native community.

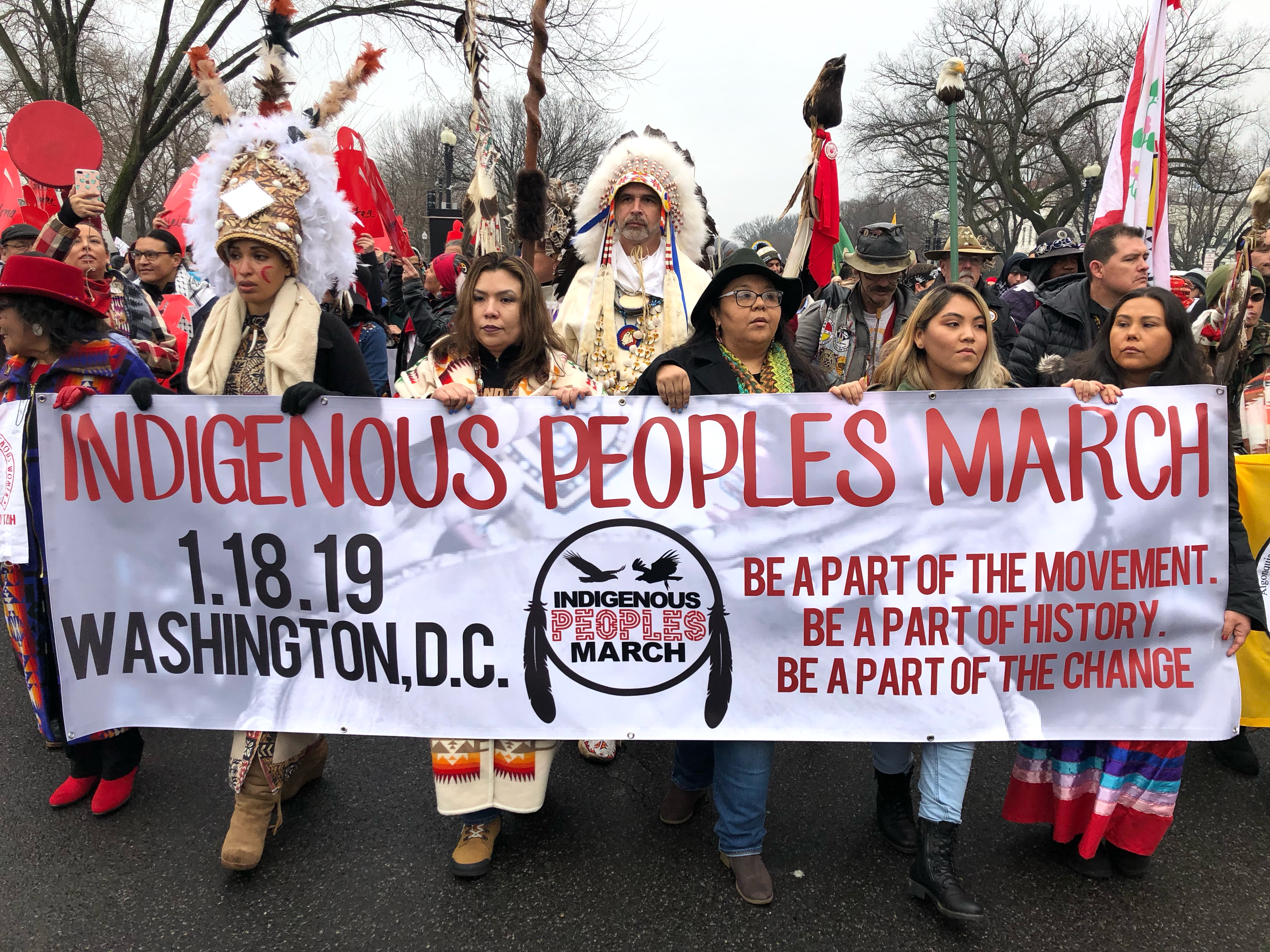
Front of Indigenous Peoples Marchprocession, 2019

=== Indigenous Peoples March ===
In 2019, the Indigenous Peoples Movement led the Indigenous Peoples March in Washington, D.C. The event included speeches, prayers, songs, and dance. Its goal was to draw attention to global injustices against Indigenous peoples.

== See also ==
- Ethnic groups in Washington, D.C.
- History of Washington, D.C.
- History of Native Americans in the United States
