= Levine School of Music =

Levine Music

Location
- Washington, District of Columbia; U.S. 38°56′34″N 77°3′23″W

Information
- Type: Private Music School
- Established: 1976
- President and CEO: Jeffery Tribble Jr
- Faculty: 200
- Campus: DC Campus: NW, DC Campus: THEARC, MD Campus: Silver Spring, MD Campus: Strathmore, and VA Campus: West Falls
- Website: www.levinemusic.org

Levine Music is a non-profit community music center serving the Greater Washington DC metropolitan area. Levine currently operates five campuses, in Northwest DC, Southeast DC, Silver Spring, MD, N. Bethesda, MD, and Falls Church, VA.

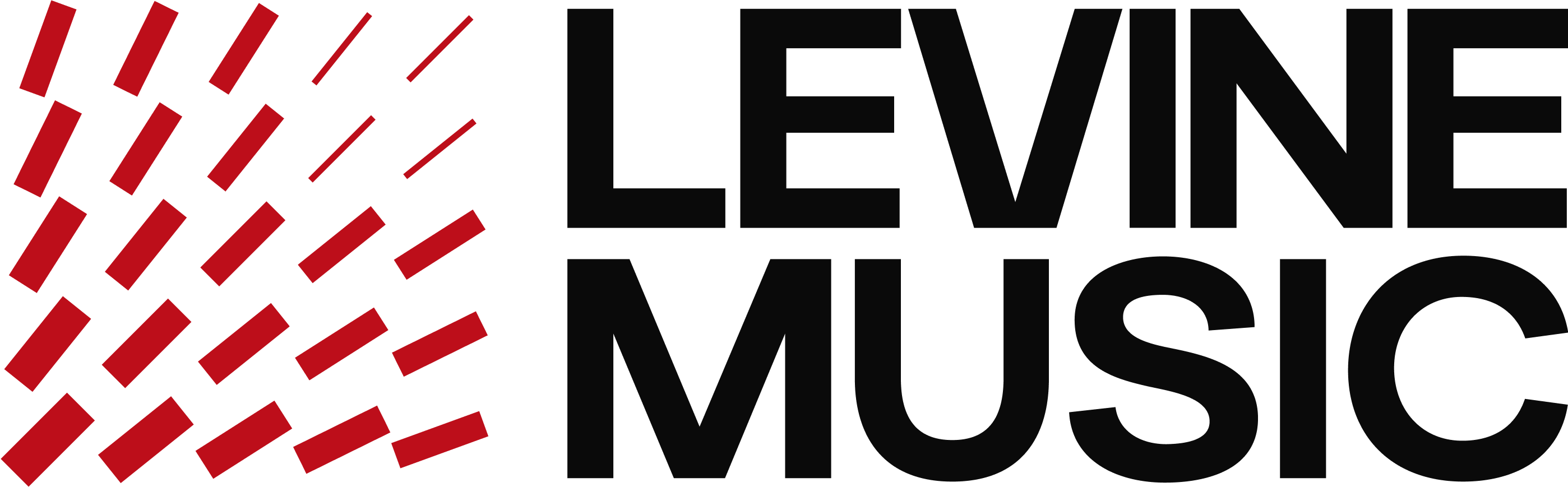

== History ==
Levine was founded in 1976 by Ruth Cogen, Diana Engel and Jackie Marlin. They named the school after their dear friend, DC attorney and amateur pianist Selma M. Levine, who had died. During its first year, Levine operated in rented rooms in a DC church, where 16 faculty members taught 70 students. A $10,000 grant from the Eugene and Agnes E. Meyer Foundation enabled the school to offer scholarships to 8 students.

In the years since then, Levine has grown into "one of the country's leading community music schools." It has expanded to five campuses, 4,000 students, and 200 faculty members.

Levine initially opened its campus in Southeast D.C. in 1992, at the Village of Parklands Shopping Center in Anacostia, becoming the first major arts non-profit to serve the Southeast section of the city. In 2005, Levine moved the Southeast Campus to the Town Hall Education Arts and Recreation Campus (THEARC). THEARC also houses branches of a number of other organizations: the Children’s Hospital Wellness Clinic, the Boys & Girls Clubs of Greater Washington, Covenant House, The Washington Ballet, Corcoran School of Art and Design, Parklands Community Center, Trinity Washington University, and the Washington Middle School for Girls. Levine's program at THEARC serves 200 children, 90% of whom require scholarship support. In 2025, Levine moved the Virginia Campus to a newly developed mixed used community in West Falls where it offers private and group instruction, a digital piano lab, early childhood music education classes, music therapy, and a versatile performance space for recitals and master classes.

== Today ==
Levine is one of only 16 community music schools accredited by the National Association of Schools of Music, and the only all-Steinway community music center in the world. As well, Levine is certified by the National Guild of Community Schools of the Arts as "exemplifying the highest standards of excellence and access in community arts education."

Levine offers music instruction to all interested students in the Greater Washington area, regardless of age, ability, or financial circumstances. Its students range in age from infants to seniors citizens.

=== Areas of study ===
- Chamber Music
- Early Childhood & Elementary Music
- Guitar
- Jazz
- Music Therapy
- Music Theory & Composition
- Percussion
- Piano
- Recording Arts
- Strings
- Summer Programs
- Suzuki Method
- Voice
- Winds & Brass

=== Partner organizations ===
- Town Hall Education, Arts and Recreation Campus, THEARC
- The Music Center at Strathmore (Maryland)
- The Silver Spring Library

=== News ===
- Northern Virginia Magazine: Favorites for Kids
- NASA and the Levine School Combine Space and Music
- Washington City Paper Best of DC Best Summer Camp - Camp Levine
- Washington Business Journal Jeffery Tribble Jr Named President and CEO of Levine Music

== Professors ==
- Ralitza Patcheva - Piano
- Jose Santana - Piano
- Michael Volchok - Piano
- Carlos César Rodríguez - Piano

== Alumni ==
- Alyson Cambridge (born 1980), operatic soprano and classical music, jazz, and American popular song singer
