= Thurgood Marshall Academy =

Thurgood Marshall Academy Public Charter High School
- Thurgood Marshall Academy

Location
- 2427 Martin Luther King Jr. Ave SE; Washington, D.C. 20020; United States
- 38°51′44″N 76°59′38″W

Information
- Type: Law-themed, college preparatory
- Established: 2001 (25 years ago)
- School district: DC Public Charter School Board
- CEEB code: 090210
- Grades: 9–12
- Gender: Co-educational
- Colors: Burgundy and white
- Athletics: Flag football, boy's and girls basketball, girls volleyball, track and cross country
- Mascot: Warriors
- Nickname: TMA
- Accreditation: Middle States
- Website: thurgoodmarshallacademy.org

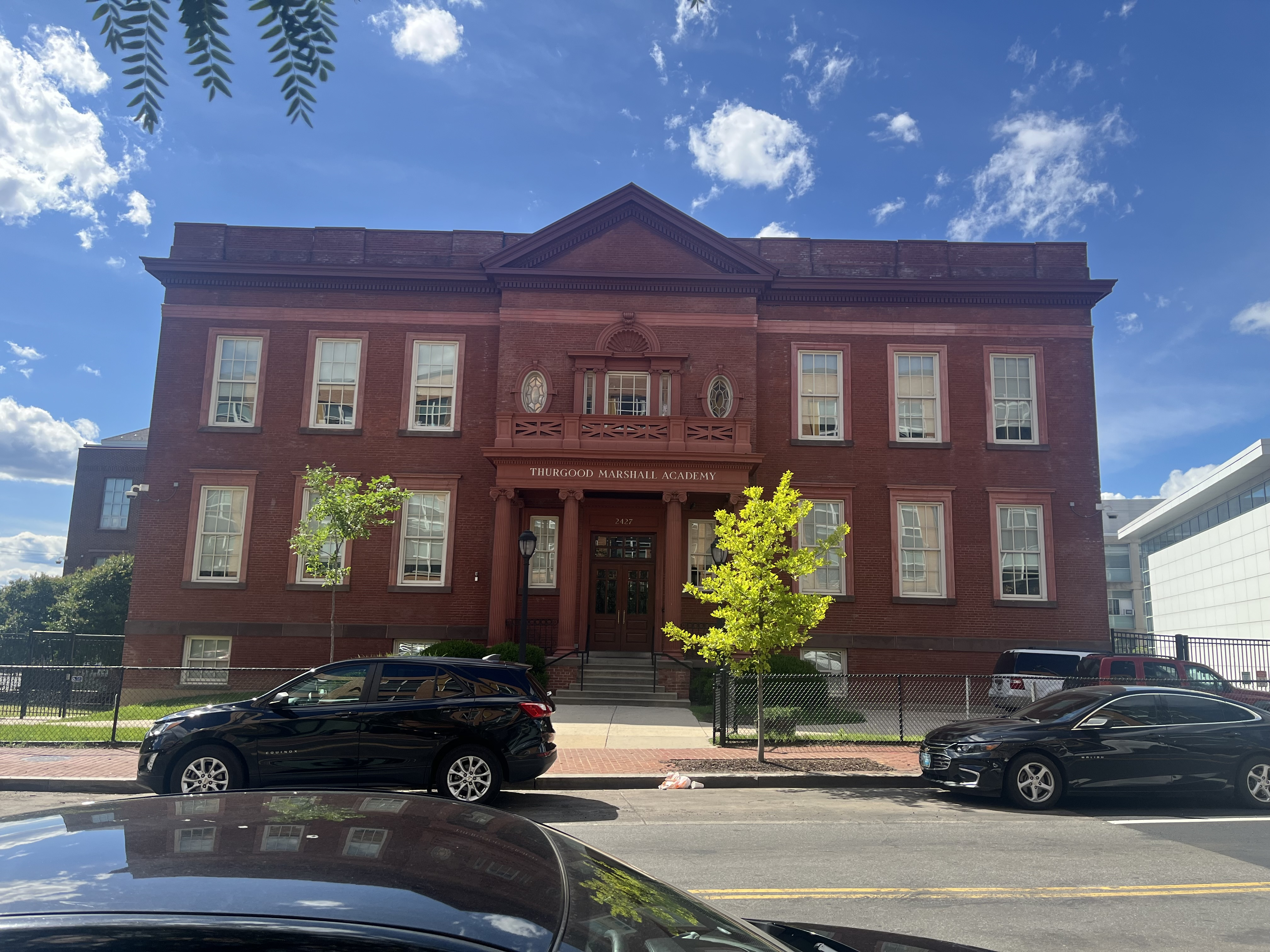

Thurgood Marshall Academy is a charter school in Washington, D.C., United States, the first law-themed school in DC. Thurgood Marshall Academy was founded based on the principles of Justice Thurgood Marshall that every child should have a world-class education and the opportunity to reach their full potential. The school is located in the Anacostia neighborhood of Washington D.C.

== History ==
Thurgood Marshall Academy grew out of the experience of law students and professors in the DC Street Law clinical program at Georgetown University Law Center.

Thurgood Marshall Academy opened in 2001, serving 80 9th-graders in a rented church basement; the school added a grade each year. In 2005, the school renovated, expanded, and moved into its permanent facility in Anacostia. In 2009, the school opened a new gymnasium to be shared with next-door A. Kiger Savoy Elementary, creating a full-service educational campus to meet a range of youth development needs in Ward 8. The school also broke ground for an expanded school garden shared with Savoy Elementary School. Thurgood Marshall Academy earned a full continuance of its charter in 2007 and full accreditation in 2008.

== Going green ==
Through the educators in the science field and other faculty sponsors at Thurgood Marshall Academy, the school has taken steps to become more energy efficient and environmentally friendly. Along with the TMA Green Club, the school has an organic garden with home-grown vegetables, and 15 solar panels on the roof of the school. The school won the 2011 Mayor's Environmental Award for Excellence by an Educational Facility for its efforts.

== Awards and media ==
According to the DC Public Charter School Board's 2011 PMF ranking, TMA was one of three charter high schools to receive Tier 1 status, meeting the standards of high performance.

The school has been ranked as a Bronze Medal School by U.S. News & World Report'.

CBS Evening News featured the school in its broadcast in June 2010.
