= Nacotchtank =

Native American people

Total population
- Extinct as a tribe, absorbed into the Piscataway

Regions with significant populations
- Washington, D.C.

Languages
- Piscataway

Religion
- Native American religion

Related ethnic groups
- Piscataway

The Nacotchtank, also Anacostine, were an Algonquian Indigenous people of the Northeastern Woodlands.

During the 17th century, the Nacotchtank resided within the present-day borders of Washington, D.C., along the intersection of the Potomac and Anacostia rivers.

The Nacotchtank spoke Piscataway, a variant of the Algonquian subfamily spoken by many tribes along the coast of the Atlantic Ocean. This was due to close association and tributary relationship with the nearby Piscataway Confederacy, whose tayac (grand chief) ruled over a loose confederacy of tribes in Southern Maryland from the village of Moyaone to the south.

As the neighboring Maryland colony sought land for tobacco plantations, the Nacotchtank were encroached upon and forcibly removed from their land. They were last recorded in the late 1600s to have taken refuge on nearby Theodore Roosevelt Island located in the Potomac River. Over time, the small population that was left behind after battle and disease was absorbed into the Piscataway.

In his 1608 expedition, English explorer John Smith noted the prosperity of the Nacotchtank and their great supply of various resources. Various pieces of art and other cultural artifacts, including hair combs, pendants, pottery, and dog bones, have been found in excavations throughout Washington, D.C., on Nacotchtank territory.

== Name ==
The name Nacotchtank (and variants Anaquashtank, Nacothtant, or Nachatanke) is derived from the word anaquashatanik, meaning "a town of traders"; this reflected how the Nacotchtank were a trading people established on fertile land on the nearby rivers.

The process by which Nacotchtank was slowly changed to Anacostine was done by European colonists. During their colonization, English settlers frequently got rid of unfamiliar and unaccustomed sounds in the words from the local languages and replaced them with sounds that were easier to pronounce and to which they were more familiar. As a result, the English settlers that were interacting with the Nacotchtank would not pronounce the "-tchtank" and would replace it with the ending "-stine," which was easier to enunciate. Through transmission of the mispronounced Nacotchtank name amongst English settlers, the Nacotchtank name was slowly faded out and replaced with Nacostine.

Later on, the Jesuits from the Province of Maryland further latinized the term by attaching a prefix "A" to "Nacostine," creating the name Anacostine. Etymologically, keeping the "A" is indeed a closer derivation of the term "anaquashtank," but the Nacotchtank preferred to omit prefixes and suffixes from words. Any present cultural honoring of the Nacotchtank bears the legacy of the latinized version, Anacostine, as seen in the naming of the river which borders eastern D.C., the Anacostia River, or the neighborhood in southeast D.C., Anacostia.

== Classification ==
The Nacotchtank fell under the larger influence of the Piscataway Confederacy The Nacotchtank were not necessarily under complete control of the Piscataway, but rather, the Nacotchtank closely allied with them as they were a much larger group of 7,000 members in comparison to the roughly 300 members of the Nacotchtank tribe. The Piscataway affiliation was intended for protection against the rival Powhatan Confederacy of eastern Virginia.

The Piscataway Chief, or tayac, held a loose confederacy over the Nacotchtank in addition to the other surrounding tribes. The rank of the tayac was supreme to that of the individual chiefs of the smaller tribes that belonged to the Piscataway Confederacy. These lower-ranked chiefs were known as werences (also known as werowances/weroances). The Nacotchtank werence would collect and pay tribute to the Piscataway tayac who resided in a village named Mayone in present-day Prince George's County of Maryland, 15 miles south of the Nacotchtank land base.

== History ==
=== Precontact to 1608 ===
The tribe's physical location, which had a mild, temperate climate in the mid-Atlantic, allowed the Nacotchtank to become a flourishing, self-sustainable community with an abundance in myriad natural resources. Being situated along the confluence of two major rivers, the Nacotchtank had a reliable supply of fish and the area soon became a well-known fishing ground. Additionally, the rivers were surrounded by a vast area of woodlands that were home to wild game such as bison, turkey, deer, and geese. The Nacotchtank were also accomplished in agricultural practices, as they would move inland from the rivers to occupy fertile and flat land and grow a variety of crop species, most of which belonged to the Three Sisters family—corn, beans, and squash.

Since the Nacotchtank had abundant natural resources, and being located where two rivers met, they maintained an epicenter for a bustling trade network with neighboring tribes. One known intertribal network was with the Haudenosaunee of New York, with whom the Nacotchtank traded principally furs, always readily available given their extensive supply of wild game. The Nacotchtank eventually monopolized the fur trade.

=== Encounters with English settlers (1608-1650s) ===
The Nacotchtank were first recorded by Captain John Smith, who visited their palisaded village during his First Voyage in 1608, in which he explored the land surrounding the Jamestown settlement of the Colony of Virginia. Between June 16 and July 18 of 1608, Smith recorded in his journal, which has since been published as The Generall Historie of Virginia, New-England, and the Summer Isles, his impressions of the indigenous peoples of the Potomac River. Specifically speaking of the Nacotchtank, Smith writes that they were a welcoming people who "did their best to content [him]." Smith also noted the presence of a river which made the area appear to be very pleasant. These initial encounters were peaceful and did not affect the Nacotchtank existence.

In the year 1621, Captain Henry Fleet, age 20, took a party of approximately 26 settlers from Jamestown in an attempt to barter for corn from the Nacotchtank. The Nacotchtank were suspicious of the colonists, and a confrontation erupted into fighting. All of the colonists were killed except for Captain Fleet, who was captured. Held captive for 5 years, Fleet acquired the language and culture of the Nacotchtank. During his time, Fleet observed the trading village Tohoga in present-day Georgetown and noted it as being the center for the monopolized fur trade with the Iroquois.

In November 1622, the Nacotchtank faced their first death at the hand of colonial forces. This took place at the time of the Second Anglo-Powhatan War, a battle between English colonists and the Powhatan Confederacy. One tribe that the colonists closely allied with during this time was the Patawomeke (or Patawomeck). Though the Patawomeke were initially part of the Powhatan Confederacy, they were large enough that they could lose such affiliation and side with the colonists. The Patawomeke, an Algonquian-speaking people, were established across from the Nacotchtank along the Potomac River, within what are now Stafford and King George counties of Northern Virginia. Such proximity to one another resulted in long-standing hostility, with the Chief of the Patawomeke referring to the Nacotchtank as their "mortal enemies." As such, the Patawomeck chief not only allied with the colonists, but also helped them in avenging the death of Fleet's party, and in attaining corn by providing roughly 40-50 warriors to take part in a raid against the Nacotchtank. As a result of the raid, a mixed colonial and Patawomeke force killed 18 Nacotchtank people and drove the rest from their cabins before plundering and burning the village. Captain Fleet remained a captive of the Nacotchtank, but would escape in 1626.

In 1626, when Captain Fleet escaped, he left with a great sum of knowledge of the Nacotchtank way of life, and would use that information in partnering in trade with other tribes. Fleet began sailing up and down the East Coast, trading with various indigenous tribes and eventually taking over the monopoly on the fur trade that the Nacotchtank had long enjoyed. When the Jesuits arrived in Maryland in 1634, wanting to adapt church teachings for the natives, Fleet assisted by translating the Algonquian language used by the Nacotchtank to English, under the guidance of Governor Leonard Calvert.

=== The rise of the Maryland tobacco industry & the resulting displacement (1650s-1697) ===
Beginning in the 1650s, the Province of Maryland experienced an economic boom with the great popularity and demand of one of its cash crops— tobacco. This large expansion necessitated vast areas of land that could be turned into tobacco plantations as the demand was exceedingly high. In 1663, Cecil Calvert, the second Lord of Baltimore, granted Thomas Dent an 850-acre tract of land named Gisborough on the Potomac River, which bordered the principal Nacotchtank village.

The colony, in such close proximity to the Nacotchtank, now had the leverage to begin encroaching on Nacotchtank territory. Additionally, with the two groups now close to one another and in constant contact, the Europeans from Maryland introduced to the area a number of Eurasian infectious diseases to which the Nacotchtank had no immunity, such as measles, cholera, and smallpox. As a result, the Nacotchtank suffered a large population loss.

In 1668, the Nacotchtank tribe, depopulated from Eurasian diseases, collectively relocated to Anacostine Island, which has since been renamed to Theodore Roosevelt Island. Theodore Roosevelt Island is located directly across from Georgetown in the Potomac River, between what is now Washington, D.C., and Northern Virginia.

=== 1697–1700s ===
By 1697, the Nacotchtank population living on Theodore Roosevelt Island sought refuge in the larger Piscataway tribe of Southern Maryland, whom the Nacotchtank had previously been allied with. Owing to an increased sense of tolerance for indigenous peoples in Pennsylvania, the Piscataway, with whom the Nacotchtank had coalesced, migrated north and settled on land bordering the lower Susquehanna River around the year 1700. Though the Nacotchtank were absorbed by the Piscataway and relocated north, some aspects of Washington, D.C., are named after them. The river surrounding the eastern border of the city and the neighborhood in southeast, D.C., are named "Anacostia" after the latinized version of Nacotchtank.

== Geography ==
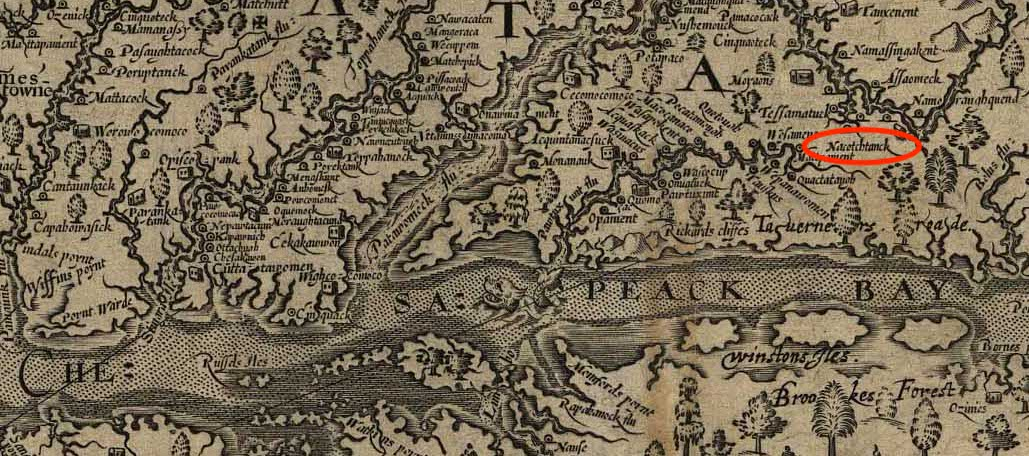
Captain John Smith's "Map Of Virginia" indicates the locations of indigenous groups as he encountered them. This image is a zoomed-in version with a red circle to indicate where Smith plotted the 'Nacotchtanck' as living in 1608.

The entirety of the Nacotchtank tribe, prior to colonization, was situated within the modern borders of the District of Columbia. The tribe was seated along the intersection of two major rivers—the Potomac and the Anacostia—thus, the majority of Nacotchtank settlements were along the water. The Nacotchtank's principal village, Nachatank, was along the eastern bank of the Potomac, on the land of what is now the Bolling Air Force Base. It was here that the Nacotchtank chief was noted as residing, along with 80 others, in Smith's journal. Smith summarized his findings in his "Map of Virginia," which plotted the principal village of the Nacotchtank in 1608. In addition to the principal village, there were multiple smaller villages, as observed by Fleet in his time held captive. Fleet mentioned four of these villages: Tohoga, Mosticum, Shaunetowa, and Usserahak.

Various excavations have been performed throughout Washington D.C., pointing to more specific areas of Nacotchtank villages. For example, a 1997 excavation near the Whitehurst Freeway, a major freeway running parallel to the Potomac in Georgetown, gathered findings of a "hair comb, hammer stone, and pendants." This land, upon which modern-day Georgetown is established, was the site for the Tohoga village, which Fleet had observed in his time as captive. Tohoga was a trading village, being located along the river bank of the Potomac, thus permitting easy access for traders.

Although the proximity of rivers was integral for the Nacotchtank, there is evidence for a Nacotchtank presence further inland, from the findings of archaeologist Samuel Proudfit, who worked for the United States Department of the Interior. Proudfit studied the excavation that was performed when the swimming pool was being constructed in the White House, which is relatively inland from any of the Nacotchtank river settlements. Analysis of the terrain that was dug up proved indigenous existence on the site, with findings such as quartzite points, a broken biface, and fragments of broken pottery. According to Proudfit, blades of quartzite that taper off into points on each end are indicative of the Nacotchtank, as they are found commonly in areas of Nacotchtank settlement and rarely in settlements of the nearby tribes. Additionally, Proudfit posits that fragmented pottery is "one of the unfailing evidences of permanent aboriginal occupation."

This theory of pottery as a marker for permanent occupation was used in Proudfit's mapping of another Nacotchtank village north of Garfield Park on what is now Capitol Hill. The Nacotchtank utilized this land, where are now the Supreme Court and Library of Congress, for agriculture, growing corn, beans, and squash. The Nacotchtank settled on this specific area as it was flat and much more suitable for agriculture than the uneven land bordering the rivers where they had been initially established. The smooth terrain allowed the Nacotchtank to grow the large stores of corn that were appealing to European colonists.

== Culture ==
=== Language ===
The Nacotchtank, being part of a confederacy led by the Piscataway, may have spoken the Piscataway language, a dialect of Nanticoke belonging to the Algonquian subfamily of languages. The Algonquian subfamily is thought to belong to an even larger grouping of languages, the Macro-Algonquian phylum. All languages under the Macro-Algonquian phylum are polysynthetic, meaning an individual word is made up of many different morphemes, the smallest linguistic units of meaning.

=== Structure ===
The principal village, Nachatank, housed the werence (subordinate Chief to the tayac), close kin, priests, and councilors. Here, the werence would store tribute, oftentimes corn and hides, from surrounding villagers. The abode of the werence and all religious buildings within the main village were protected by a palisade, and there were approximately 80 warriors contained within the village.

The structure of the Nacotchtank occupation outside of the principal village followed a particular pattern of settlement called dispersed settlement. In this pattern, there would be rather-isolated dwellings with large open fields in between them. The resultant community would have groupings of between 2 and 100 dwellings clustered together, with a shared, designated spot that would have fallen trees that were to be used for fire-burning. In between these clusters were plots of land, ranging from between 20 and 100 acres, which would be used in cultivating various plants and crops.

The Nacotchtank lived in wigwams—which were dome-shaped huts—and longhouses, as was typical of other tribes along the East Coast. The villages also had menstrual huts, which women would visit when menstruating, and communal sweat houses, where those who were sick could visit and be healed.

=== Art & other cultural artifacts ===
Two types of rock were readily available in Nacotchtank territory for their use—quartzite and soapstone. These two types of rock were available in various quarries throughout Nacotchtank territory. At these quarries, the Nacotchtank would chip away large chunks of the rock, which would then be taken back to the individual villages, where they would complete formation of whatever artifact they were intending to create. Quartzite, which was relatively-easily chipped and available in a quarry in the Piney Branch area of what is now Northwest Washington, D.C., was used in forming sharp-edged tools, particularly spears and arrow points. Soapstone was accessed mainly through the Rose Hill quarry of what is now Northwest Washington, D.C., and was utilized in producing various vessels such as bowls and pipes.

There is also evidence of the Nacotchtank producing pottery, which has been found in fragments in an excavation of the terrain under the White House.

The Carolina Dog was the only domesticated animal that lived among the Nacotchtank and is an important facet in the Nacotchtank culture. The Carolina Dog served as a symbol for respect and honor. The dogs likely played an integral role for the Nacotchtank people, as Carolina Dog skeletons have been found lying on top of human skeletons in ossuary burials collected from gravesites on Nacotchtank territory.

== See also ==
- History of Native Americans in Washington, D.C.
- Indigenous peoples of Maryland
- Indigenous peoples of Virginia
