= Town Hall Education Arts Recreation Campus =

Cultural center in Washington D.C.

Coordinates: 38.8435°N 76.975°W

Town Hall Education Arts Recreation Campus (THEARC) is a combined cultural and social services campus in Southeast Washington, D.C. The campus consists of three connected buildings, playgrounds, basketball courts and public spaces.

== Development ==
- Built by Building Bridges Across the River (BBAR) for $27 million on 110,000 square feet (10,000 m^{2}) east of the Anacostia River in Washington, DC’s Ward 8 Anacostia. BBAR is a nonprofit organization founded by William C. Smith & Co. and formed to develop, construct and manage THEARC.
- Funding for building THEARC came entirely from charitable contributions by the Federal and District government, corporations, foundations and individuals. The Federal government has leased the land to BBAR for 99 years.
- THEARC is a key part of a revitalization of the area known as “East of the (Anacostia) River” in Washington, DC.
- THEARC provides underserved children and families of East of the River dance classes, music instruction, fine arts, academics, recreation and other programs, including social services, mentoring, after school care and case management, as well as medical and dental care at substantially reduced cost or no cost at all.
- THEARC features a 365-seat heater, a regulation size gymnasium, a computer lab, an art gallery, a library, a community conference center, state-of-the-art music, art and dance studios and other first-rate facilities.

Since its official opening, THEARC has served thousands of residents of the surrounding Southeast DC Community and has spurred community redevelopment. The state-of-the-art theater at THEARC is steadily booked for events such as community movie days & sing-alongs, art shows, graduations, professional and community dance and stage productions, concerts, master classes, fashion shows and meetings of community organizations including local public school administrators. In May 2007, THEARC won the Urban Land Institute's Award for Excellence and was cited for its contribution to the community, response to societal needs, innovation, public/private partnership and environmental protection and enhancement.

== Community facilities ==
=== Theater ===
The only theater of any kind located east of the Anacostia River in Washington, DC, this 365-seat venue features a generous stage and professionally designed and installed sound and lighting systems that complement a full variety of productions. THEARC Theater's mission is to be an outstanding venue and vehicle for both cultural events and town hall meetings.

=== Community Meeting Room (CMR) ===
THEARC CMR provides a resource for meetings, conferences, seminars and other community gatherings and presentations, offering wireless Internet service, a hardwire Internet port, a projector and screen, table and chair set up and an adjoining kitchen. The room is available for lease at very reasonable prices.

=== Living History at THEARC Frederick Douglass Program ===
Frederick Douglass, the internationally acclaimed abolitionist, orator and statesman, made his home in Washington, DC's Ward 8 for nearly 20 years. To honor his legacy, a lifelike animatron, set in an exact replica of Douglass's study in his Anacostia home was created for THEARC and is available to the community. More than two hours of Douglass's famous speeches were recorded in varying lengths and complexity and programmed with coordinated body movements into the animatron. Appropriate for all ages, Douglass is also programmed to answer questions from the audience.

== Partners ==
THEARC brings together comprehensive programs and services from ten innovative organizations based on the Campus.

- Boys & Girls Clubs of Greater Washington – The FBR Branch of the Boys & Girls Clubs of Greater Washington at THEARC offers programs and activities to help youth from ages 6–18 develop character and acquire the skills necessary to become responsible, civic-minded adults. The Boys & Girls Club facility at THEARC is complete with a regulation-sized gym, a library, an arts and crafts studio, a game room, a computer lab and the Teen Center study lounge.
- Building Bridges Across the River -- Established to build THEARC, BBAR is in a new phase of operation as the lead agency at THEARC. In this role, BBAR is responsible for leading the collaborative of agencies operating at THEARC. BBAR also oversees the upkeep and maintenance of the facility and its grounds, including the management of THEARC Theater and Community Meeting Room, as well as the Living History at THEARC Frederick Douglass educational outreach program.
- Children's National Medical Center – Serving ages 0 to 23, Children's National Medical Center operates a full-service medical clinic at THEARC. Care includes preventive health care, sick visits, immunizations, chronic illness management, and psychological, legal aid, referral management and social support services. Fully staffed by a professional medical team of doctors and nurses, the clinic provides 24-hour, seven-day-a-week on-call service to patients. Comprehensive dental services are available through Children's Mobile Dental Unit. The Children's Health Project of DC @ THEARC is also the medical home for all children in the DC Foster Care system.

The Health Access Project (HAP) offered via the Children's Health Center @ THEARC is a collaboration between The Children's Law Center and Children's National Medical Center designed to improve the health of children by adding legal services attorneys to the treatment team to address non-medical barriers that impact kids’ health.

The Children's Health Project also collaborates with The Washington School of Psychiatry (WSP). WSP has trained mental health professionals working in hospitals, schools, clinics, and social service agencies for many years. With an interest in expanding its reach to the greater Washington Community, WSP developed Community Outreach Services (COS) in 2001 with a primary mission of supporting and collaborating with various agencies East of the River, who offer front line services to children and families. Over the past five years, COS has offered consultation services to staff and supportive groups for parents.

Children's Health Project of D.C. currently serves 5,000 patients throughout the community and turns no patient away, even those without insurance.

- The Corcoran Gallery of Art: Corcoran ArtReach – As one of Washington, DC's oldest art museums and the city's only college of art and design, the Corcoran resides as the visual arts partner at THEARC through the Corcoran ArtReach program. Corcoran ArtReach is a year-round museum outreach program designed to empower DC youth and families to explore and trust their own creativity within the context of art making and art history. ArtReach provides arts instruction such as family workshops, after-school and summer art classes based on the Corcoran's renowned collection. ArtReach makes a special effort to foster visual literacy, critical thinking skills and creative expression among its participants, while encouraging them to develop meaningful connections between art and their lives. In addition to ArtReach, the Corcoran oversees the Community Gallery at THEARC, which serves as an exhibition venue for program participants, local artists and community organizations and schools. Sixty-five children currently attend art classes at no charge through ArtReach.
- Covenant House Washington – Covenant House's Nancy Dickerson White Community Center, targeting youth ages 16–21, helps youth in crisis reclaim their lives and their dignity. Covenant House offers youth skills assessment, educational services, youth advocacy and leadership training, and employment development. The agency also offers Residential Programs for youth age 18-21, Prevention Services Programs for ages 11–17, and the Artisans Woodworking Program.
- Levine School of Music – One of the nation's largest nonprofit community music schools, Levine School of Music offers music education to students of every age, ability and background. Course offerings at THEARC include Choral Music, Guitar, Jazz & Improvisation, Piano, Percussion, Voice, Early Childhood Music and more. Levine faculty and guest artists offer performances and master classes to enrich this curriculum.
- Trinity Washington – Trinity at THEARC offers two degree programs: an associate of arts degree in general studies and a master of science in administration. Students at Trinity at THEARC can attend college right out of high school or take courses while they are pursuing their careers.
- Washington Ballet – The Washington Ballet @ THEARC houses the southeast campus of The Washington School of Ballet and two unique community engagement programs, DanceDC and EXCEL! The space is equipped with two dance studios with pianos for live accompaniment, locker rooms, offices and use of THEARC Theater. TWB@THEARC offers a pre-professional ballet program for children ages five through 18 as well as the adult program with classes in modern, hip hop, Pilates, and African dance. Students enrolled in the program receive additional opportunities such as performing in The Nutcracker featuring The Washington Ballet. TWB@THEARC also hosts a Summer Dance Intensive, which allows children to foster their love for ballet while participating in programs with THEARC partners.
- Washington Middle School for Girls – Washington Middle School for Girls at THEARC encourages young girls growing up in East of the River, Washington, DC to stay in school and exceed beyond their imaginations. The school offers an academically challenging curriculum for grades 4-8.

== THEARC non-resident partners ==
=== Legal Aid Society of DC ===
The Legal Aid Society of the District of Columbia provides free legal services to low or no-income persons living in DC in the areas of housing, domestic violence/family law and public benefits law. Legal Aid offers a continuum of services including advice, counsel and brief assistance; representation in litigation; social work case management, and community education on legal issues. Additionally, Legal Aid's Appellate Advocacy project handles cases across the spectrum of poverty law that have the potential to positively impact the lives of thousands of the District's poor and underserved.

=== Training Grounds, Inc. ===
Training Grounds' mission is to equip and prepare economically disadvantaged DC youth and young adults for living wage careers through professional skills, personal development and entrepreneurship training. Participants learn the skills necessary to success in today's business climate, as well as an entrepreneurial mindset and pathways to sustainable lifestyles. Assessments and surveys, a comprehensive training regimen and internships via program partners are all part of Training Grounds offerings.

== Campaigns ==
=== One in a Million Campaign for THEARC ===
The “One in a Million Campaign for THEARC” was THEARC's $10 million grassroots endowment campaign launched in 2006 seeking to sustain the operations of THEARC. At the heart of the Campaign was the need to alleviate the operational budgets of THEARC's ten organizations so they can further invest in programming for children and families in the community.
