= Anacostia Pool riot =

Coordinates: 38°52′20.6″N 76°58′58.7″W

Anacostia riot
- Date: June 29, 1949
- Location: Anacostia, Washington, D.C., U.S.
- Caused by: Enforcement of federal desegregation order
- Methods: Attack or clash, armed conflict

Parties
white rioters	black rioters

Casualties
- Injuries: 4
- Arrested: 5

The Anacostia Pool riot took place on June 29, 1949, at a recently desegregated public swimming pool in the Anacostia neighborhood of Washington, D.C. After two days of tense confrontations between white and black patrons of the pool, a two-hour large-scale disturbance involving 450 people resulted in five arrests and at least four serious injuries. Bill Mabry, one of the black swimmers involved, called the incident “Washington’s first race riot.” Despite pressure to relax the enforcement of the federal government's nonsegregation policy, the Department of the Interior stated that “no backward step of any sort should be made in effectuating the President’s Civil Rights program,” specifically with respect to Washington, DC.

== Background ==
The post-World War II civil rights movement frequently targeted segregated urban leisure venues, provoking violent reactions and even riots from recalcitrant whites. In summer 1949, black activists who attempted to integrate segregated beaches and other public recreational facilities around the country were met with violent resistance, as was the case in the Fairground Park riot in St. Louis, Missouri. Among other reasons, pools were particularly contentious sites in the Civil Rights Movement because their desegregation implied the direct mixing of white and black bodies, both in locker rooms and in the water. Many whites also held onto the belief, long proven false by the medical community, that biracial pool use spread infection.

As “a segregated capital in a democratic nation,” Washington, DC was a particularly important site for postwar activists. The city was deeply segregated. One activist, who had arrived in the city to study law at Howard University in 1943, observed, “Although the city had no segregation ordinance requiring separation of the races, Negroes were systematically barred from hotels, restaurants, movie houses, and other places of public accommodation.”

== Pools desegregated ==
In June 1949, Julius Albert Krug, Secretary of the Department of the Interior, announced that the federal government's nonsegregation policy would be enforced at the six pools in the city that were on federal lands owned by the department. Although they were on federal lands, the lifeguards who ran day-to-day operations were employees of the District Recreation Board, which supported segregation in recreational facilities.

On June 23, 1949, the pools were formally desegregated. Over the next few days, around 50 local black children attempted to swim at Anacostia Pool. Some were granted admittance, but most were turned away by the lifeguards. After less than a week of the tenuous situation, lifeguards at the Anacostia Pool “asked to be relieved, saying they feared they might not be able to handle disturbances.”

== Violence ==
On June 26, 1949, only four days after the pool was formally desegregated, white pool users started being violent to black youths at the pool.

When two young black men began to swim, they were surrounded by a group of white boys, who splashed them and forced them to get out of the pool. About 50 white bystanders joined the group of white boys and began to surround and boo the two young black men. Although the police were called, officers did not address or punish the mob of whites. One hour later, another four young black men between 14 and 21 began to swim in the pool, and again, they were splashed and forced out by whites. The incidents were witnessed by 700-800 whites.

The white patrons of the Anacostia Pool continued to intimidate and clash with black pool users over the next few days “in the vicinity of the Anacostia park swimming pool.” On June 28, 1949, 20 police officers were called to break up fights between about 100 whites and 20 blacks.

The conflict came to a head during the afternoon of June 29 when about 100 whites and 70 blacks were at the Anacostia pool. A group of white men chased a young black man out of the pool, who cut himself while he was climbing the fence surrounding the facility to escape the mob. Although police began to separate whites and blacks leaving the pool, the fighting simply moved outside the pool facilities. A police captain at the scene estimated that 450 people gathered in Anacostia Park. Many members of the crowd were armed with baseball bats, clubs, and, in some cases, concealed knives.

Ultimately, the riot ended in four injuries serious enough to be treated at Casualty Hospital. Five men were arrested, two blacks and three whites. However, two of the three whites were racial liberals, arrested for passing out pamphlets for the Young Progressives Party, a communist front group, without a permit.

== Aftermath ==
On the night of June 29, police surrounded the Pool to ensure the riots would not continue. That night, Secretary of the Interior Krug announced that the Anacostia Pool was closed “until further notice.” The Department of the Interior refused to relinquish control of the pools, despite the efforts of the District Recreation Board.

By August 16, 1949, a biracial group of 25 mothers came forward to ask Krug to reopen the Anacostia Pool as a desegregated facility. They demanded for the nonsegregation policy of the federal government to continue to be enforced at the pool by trained police officers, both black and white. After a lengthy debate, it was announced that the pool would be reopened by the Department of the Interior as an integrated facility, which happened in summer 1950, with an increased police presence.

While no further disturbances occurred, there was a marked dropoff in attendance.

== See also ==
- List of incidents of civil unrest in the United States
