= Anacostia =

Neighborhood in Washington, D.C.

- Neighborhood
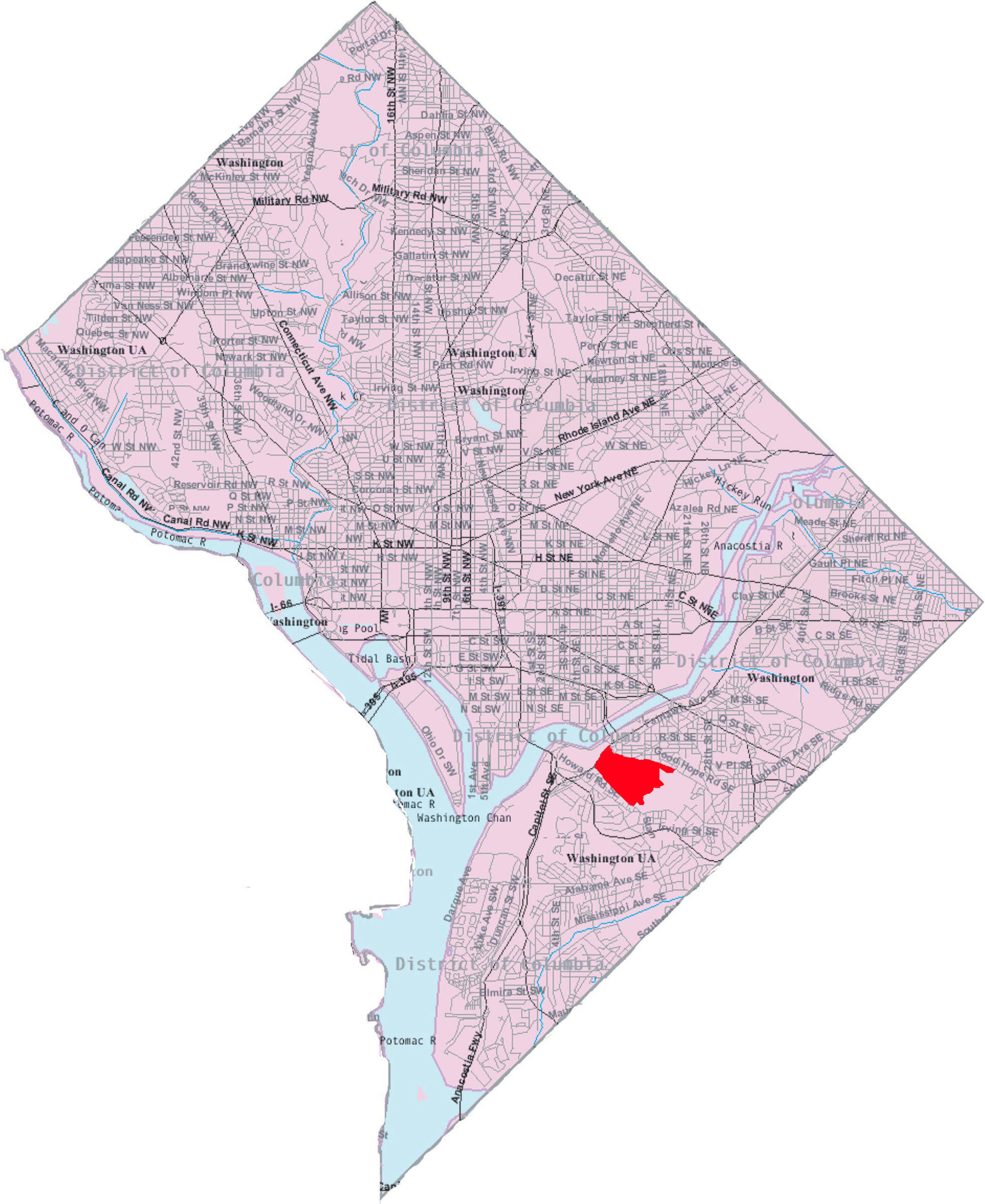
- Anacostia within the District of Columbia
- Country: United States
- District: Washington, D.C.
- Ward: Ward 8

Government
  - Councilmember: Trayon White

Anacostia (/ˌænəˈkɑːstiə/ ANN-ə-KAHS-tee-ə) is a historic neighborhood in Southeast Washington, D.C. in the United States. Its downtown is located at the intersection of Marion Barry Avenue (formerly Good Hope Road) SE and Martin Luther King Jr Avenue SE. Originally known as "Uniontown" the neighborhood contains commercial and government buildings, mid-rise mixed development, city-sanctioned art murals and galleries (under the "Art to Go Go" initiative), a performing arts center, a playhouse theater, the local landmark, "The Big Chair," Frederick Douglass's Home (a museum and historic site) and is adjacent to the Fort Stanton Park neighborhood which hosts the Smithsonian affiliated Anacostia Community Museum. Anacostia is located directly east of and along the Anacostia River, after which the neighborhood is named. The community's population is more than 90 percent African American.

Bounded by the Southeast Freeway to the north and northwest, the Suitland Parkway to the south and southwest as well as Fort Stanton and Ricketts Park to the east, Anacostia includes all of the Anacostia Historic District, which was listed on the National Register of Historic Places in 1978. The Frederick Douglass National Historic Site preserves the famous 19th century civil rights leader's home. The Anacostia Community Museum is part of the Smithsonian. Often the name "Anacostia" is used to refer to the entire portion of the city that is southeast of the Anacostia River. The Anacostia Business Improvement District is responsible for the development of the area.

== History ==
The name "Anacostia" comes from the anglicized name of a Nacochtank settlement along the Anacostia River. Archaeological evidence indicates that American Indians settled in the Washington, D.C., area at least 4,000 years ago, close to the Anacostia River. Native inhabitants within the present-day District of Columbia included the Nacotchtank, at Anacostia, who were affiliated with the Conoy.

Captain John Smith explored the area in 1608, traveling up the "Eastern Branch"—later the Anacostia River—mistaking it for the main body of the Potomac River, and met Anacostans. Before the arrival of whites, the Nacostine villages in this area were a lively center of trade visited by Native Americans such as the Iroquois of New York. Even after the founding of Maryland, Leonard Calvert, in a letter to a merchant in London, described "Anacostan" as one of the three best places in the colony for trading with natives.

Around the year 1668, native peoples previously living south of Anacostia were forced northward by war. Anacostine Island, which first appeared on a 1670 map drawn by Augustine Herman, was settled by the Anacostans around this time.

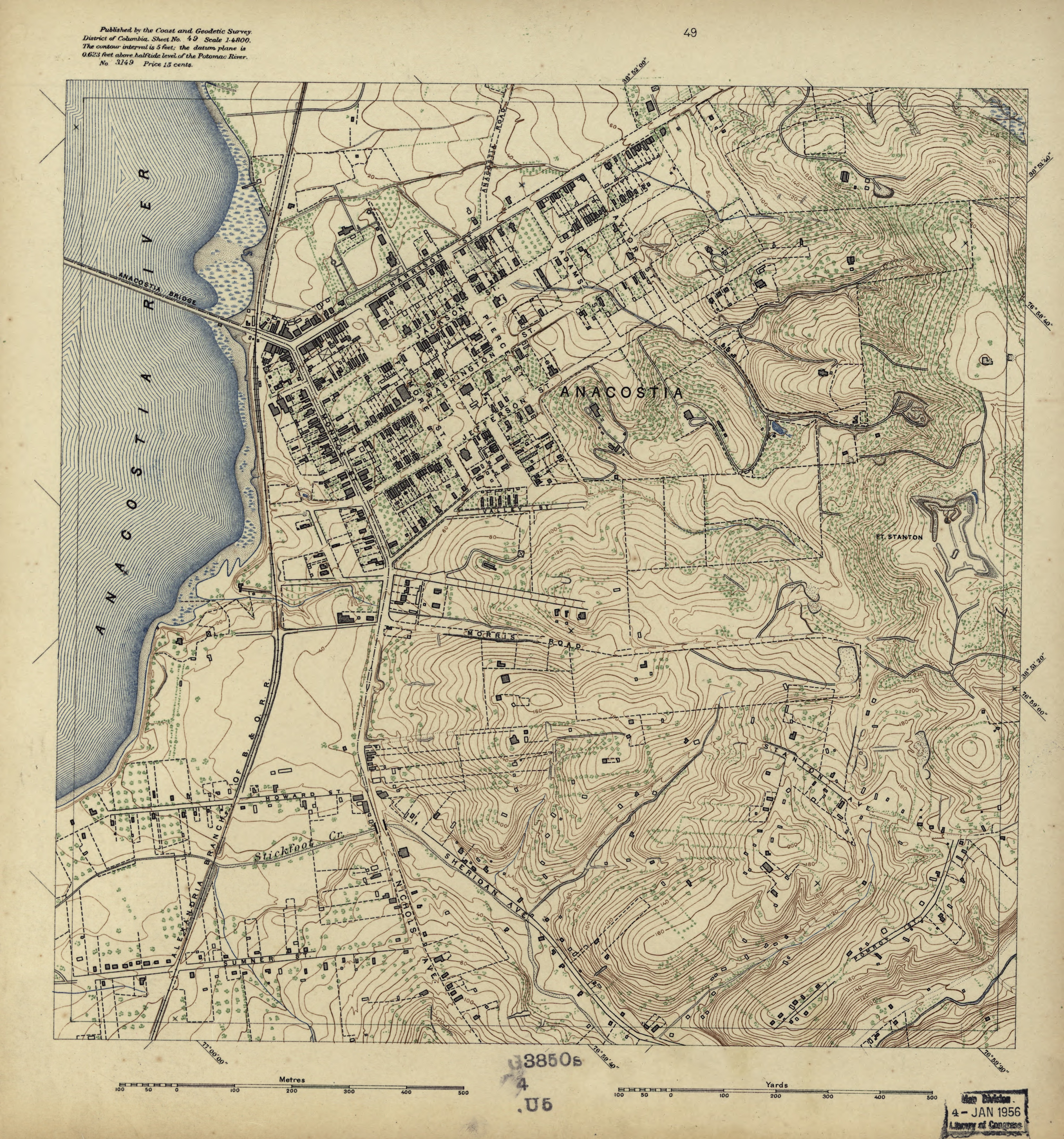
1892 map of Anacostia, DC

The core of what is now the Anacostia historic district was incorporated in 1854 as Uniontown and was one of the early suburbs in the District of Columbia. It was designed to be affordable for Washington's working class, many of whom were employed across the river at the Navy Yard; its (then) location outside of and isolated from the city made its real estate inexpensive. The initial subdivision of 1854 carried restrictive covenants prohibiting the sale, rental or lease of property to anyone of African or Irish descent.

During the Civil War, Anacostia was protected by a series of forts upon the hills southwest of the city. Following the conclusion of the war, the forts were dismantled and the land returned to its original owners.

Abolitionist Frederick Douglass, often called "the sage of Anacostia", bought Cedar Hill, the estate belonging to the developer of Uniontown, in 1877 and lived there until he died in 1895. The home is still maintained as the Frederick Douglass National Historic Site in Anacostia.

Anacostia, always part of the District of Columbia, became a part of the city of Washington when the city and District became coterminous in 1878. On January 27, 1886, the House of Representatives Committee on the District of Columbia voted in favor of renaming Uniontown to Anacostia. After the bill passed the House of Representatives, the Senate also voted in favor of the name change. The name change became effective on April 22, 1886. At the time, property deeds restricted land ownership to people who were white, and therefore Anacostia had only white residents.

The opening of the Pennsylvania Avenue Bridge in 1890 linked Anacostia to the rest of the District of Columbia.

=== Great Depression ===
In 1932, during the Great Depression, unemployed World War I veterans from all across the country marched on Washington to demand immediate payment of a bonus promised to them. The event became known as the Bonus Army Conflict. Most of the Bonus Army camped on Anacostia Flats, a swampy, muddy area along the Anacostia River later reclaimed as Anacostia Park/Fairlawn Park. Fearing civil unrest, President Herbert Hoover ordered the military to disperse the campers from Washington. The Army Chief of Staff General Douglas MacArthur dispersed them, but exceeded the orders of the President by crossing the bridge to Anacostia and torching the veterans' encampment. MacArthur believed that the Bonus Army was composed of and led by Communists. George Patton and Dwight Eisenhower served under MacArthur during these events.

=== Post-war years ===
Anacostia's population remained predominantly white and European-American up until the late 1950s and early 1960s, with whites comprising 87% of the population. During the 1960s, the Anacostia Freeway (I-295) was constructed. The highway imposed a barrier between the Anacostia neighborhood and the Anacostia River waterfront. Numerous public housing apartment complexes were built in the neighborhood. With the flight of much of the white middle class out of the neighborhood during the late 1950s and 1960s due to desegregation measures taking place, Anacostia's demographics changed dramatically as the neighborhood became predominantly African American. Interactions between the area's white and black residents were often contentious, as was the case in the 1949 Anacostia riot at a desegregated public pool.

Shopping, dining, and entertainment facilities throughout greater Anacostia are limited, as development slowed with a decrease in income in the area. Residents often must travel to either the suburbs or downtown Washington for these services. Anacostia, however, does have a year-round ice skating rink at Fort Dupont Park; the city police boys' club; and a tennis and learning center, combining sports with academic tutoring in Congress Heights.

St. Elizabeth's Hospital, D.C. Village and the Blue Plains sewage treatment plant were long-established Anacostia developments noted in a late-1990s report. The report also cited attention to the area at that time from Hillary Clinton and Newt Gingrich.

In 2005, Building Bridges Across the River opened the 110,000-square-foot (10,000 m2) Town Hall Education Arts Recreation Campus (THEARC) which is home to eleven nonprofit organizations, all of which share the goal of helping children and adults reach their full potential. Free summer evening jazz concerts are also given weekly in Fort Dupont Park. The annual Martin Luther King Jr. Birthday Parade is a notable annual event along the Avenue bearing Dr. King's name. Starting in 2006 the annual parade date was changed from January to April. (Also see the separate article on Congress Heights). In January 2007 a new large supermarket opened to serve the neighborhood.

== Geography ==
Anacostia downtown is located at the intersection of Marion Barry Avenue (formerly Good Hope Road) and Martin Luther King Jr. Avenue. It is the most famous neighborhood in the Southeast quadrant of Washington, located east of the Anacostia River, after which the neighborhood is named.

== Demographics ==
As of the 2010 Census, Anacostia's population is 92% African-American, 5% Non-Hispanic White, and 3% other.

== Landmarks ==
The Anacostia Historic District is listed on the National Register of Historic Places as a historic district, and it retains much of its mid-to-late 19th-century low-scale, working-class character, as is evident in its architecture.

In 1957, an Anacostia landmark, the "world's largest chair", was installed at the corner of Martin Luther King Jr. Avenue and V Street SE. The chair was installed by the Curtis Brothers Furniture Company and built by Bassett Furniture. In the summer of 2005, the "Big Chair" was removed for repairs, then returned in April 2006.

== Industry ==
Joint Base Anacostia–Bolling (formerly Bolling Air Force Base and Naval Support Facility Anacostia) are in the area.

== Tourism ==
Founded in 2000, the Anacostia Waterfront Initiative is revitalizing a 45-acre (180,000 m^{2}) piece of the Anacostia River waterfront to promote the community. Plans include numerous parks restored of their natural wetlands and forests, canoe tie-ups, a playground, a four-acre 9/11 memorial grove, and an environmental education center. The center provides visitors with education about the history and use of the Anacostia River through a 9,000-square-foot (840 m^{2}), two-story complex topped by a green roof/nursery center with classrooms, labs, and a multipurpose area beneath. Studios Architecture was chosen to be the architect of the project, while the administrating agency will be the Anacostia Waterfront Corporation.

== Hospitals ==
- St. Elizabeths Hospital (more than 100 years old)
- United Medical Center (formally Greater Southeast Community Hospital)

== Education ==
District of Columbia Public Schools operates public schools. Anacostia High School serves Anacostia. Ballou High School is in southern Anacostia. The area has a number of middle and elementary schools, and is also the location of Thurgood Marshall Academy.

== Culture ==
- The Anacostia Museum, a branch of the Smithsonian Institution, was established in 1967 by S. Dillon Ripley, then-Secretary of the Smithsonian Institution.
- The Anacostia Arts Center and Honfleur Gallery, located near the corner of Martin Luther King Jr. Ave and Good Hope Road is a gallery showcasing nationally known works alongside that of local artists. It hosts a bi-monthly poetry series called Intersections, sponsored by the American Poetry Museum.
- District of Columbia Public Library operates the Anacostia Neighborhood Library.
- Cedar Hill, the home of abolitionist Frederick Douglass, known as the "Lion of Anacostia", sits atop a hill overlooking the Anacostia neighborhood on W Street SE.
- The Anacostia Playhouse brings in many different events to their blackbox theater which includes productions by Theater Alliance located at 2020 Shannon Place SE.

=== Cultural reference ===
In the 2007 film inspired by the life of Ralph Waldo 'Petey' Greene (played by Don Cheadle), Greene's straightlaced counterpart Dewey Hughes played by Chiwetel Ejiofor surprises all with his skill at '9 ball' pool. "Grew up in the Anacostia projects ... [and] made [my] way through school hustling", he explains about himself after their game in Talk to Me. The film is set in the late 1960s.

== Transportation ==
The neighborhood, served by the Anacostia Metro station, is a 10-minute ride on Washington Metro's Green Line from downtown Washington; other Metro stations on the Green and Orange lines serve other parts of Greater Anacostia.

I-295 runs through the neighborhood; it connects to DC 295 further north, and these two routes make up the entire routing of the Anacostia Freeway.

== Gallery ==
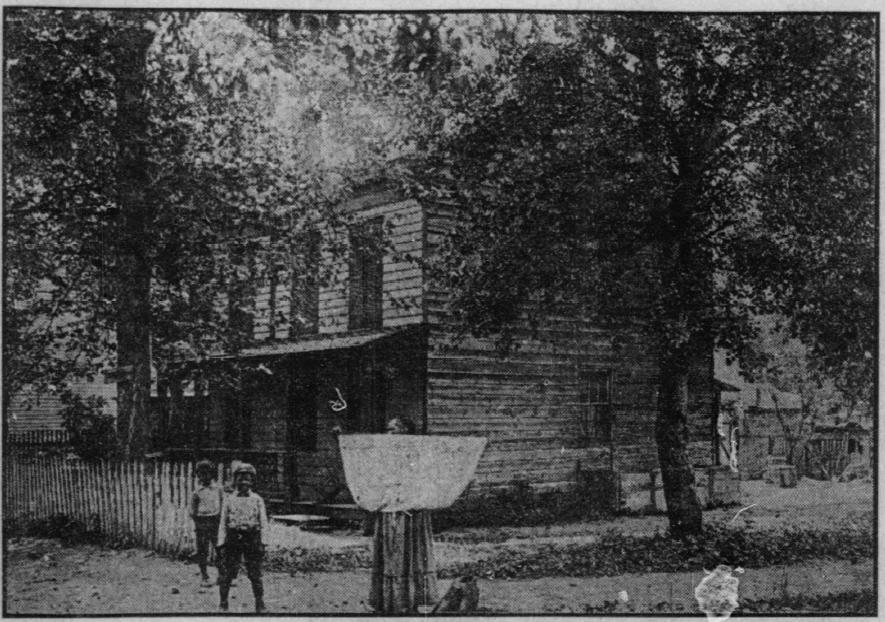
An old Anacostia cottage

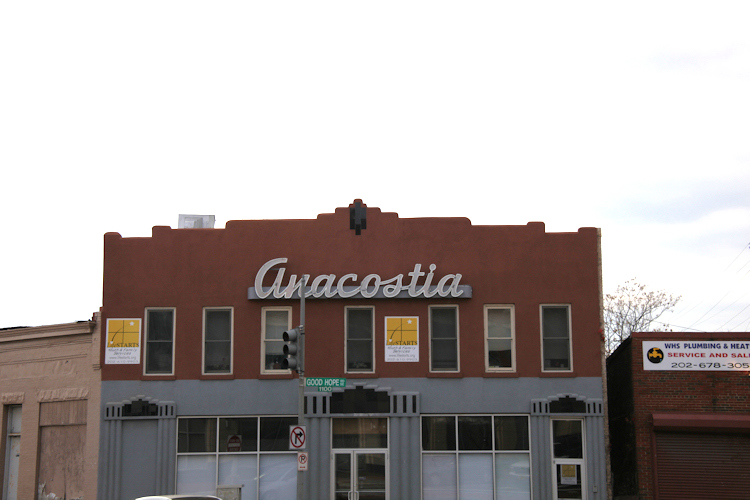
The historic neon "Anacostia" sign at 1115 Good Hope Road SE. The sign is the traditional gateway to Historic Old Anacostia.

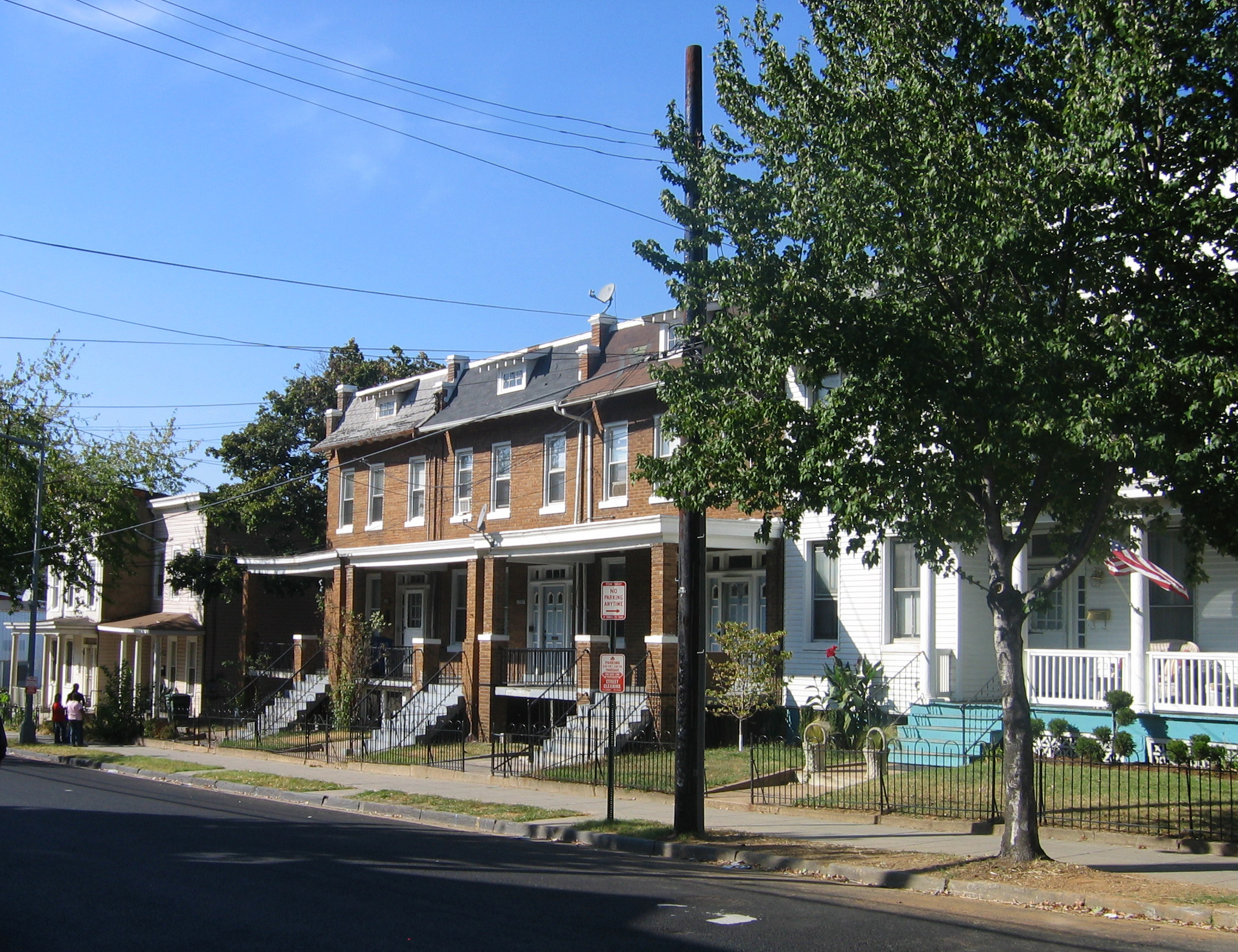
Houses on W Street, SE in Anacostia.

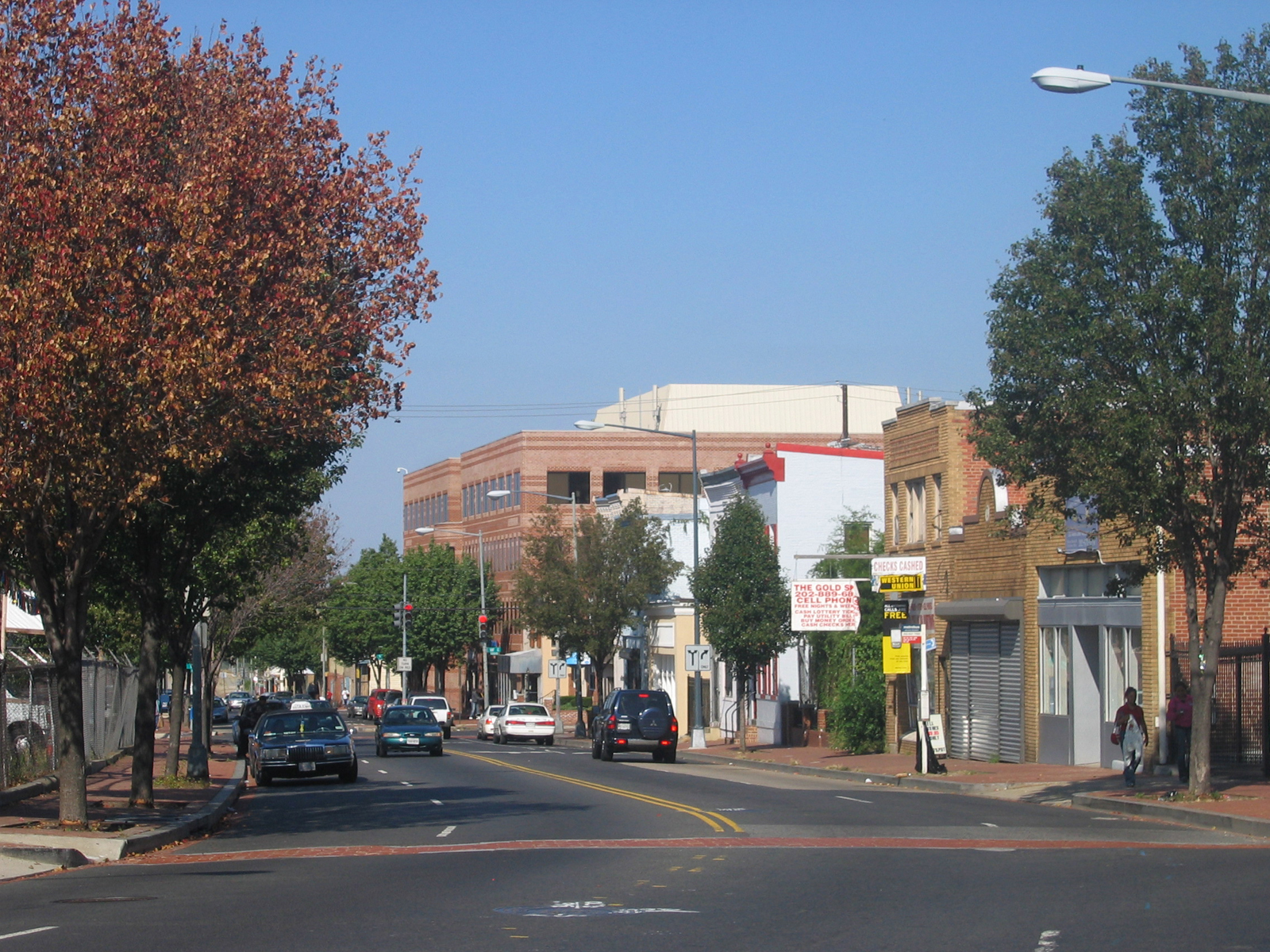
Martin Luther King Jr. Avenue, SE in Anacostia.

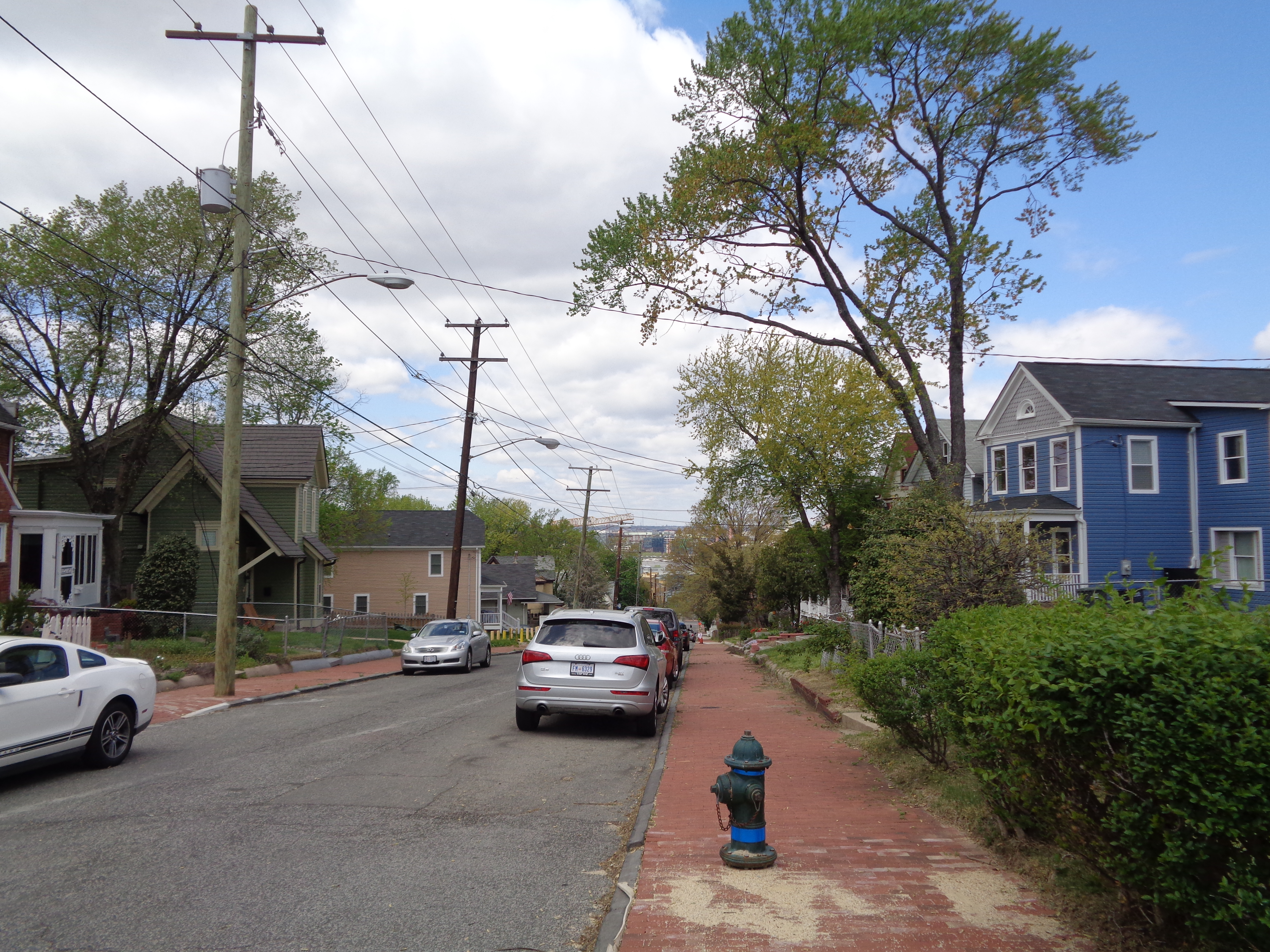
The intersection of High St. & Maple View Place SE

== See also ==
- Anacostia Historic District
- Congress Heights
- Fort Greble
- Fort Stanton
- Washington Bellevue
- Washington Hillcrest
- Washington Highlands
