= Honfleur Gallery =

Gallery in Washington, D.C.

Coordinates: 38.8671°N 76.9873°W

Honfleur Gallery located on Good Hope Road in the Anacostia Historic District neighborhood of Washington, D.C., is a gallery that was established in January 2007 by the Action to Rehabilitate Community Housing group. The art gallery opened amid concerns of whether an art gallery was what the neighborhood needed.

By 2014, seven years after its formal opening, local residents were apparently still divided over the impact or reason for the art gallery in the neighborhood. "The neighborhood, long synonymous with urban blight, is an unconventional choice for a swanky art gallery," asserted a 2014 Washington Post article on the gallery.

== Critical reception ==
Exhibitions at the gallery have been widely reviewed over the years by local newspapers, fine arts websites, and art blogs.
